= Vanduzeeina borealis =

Scientific classification
- Domain: Eukaryota
- Kingdom: Animalia
- Phylum: Arthropoda
- Class: Insecta
- Order: Hemiptera
- Suborder: Heteroptera
- Family: Scutelleridae
- Genus: Vanduzeeina
- Species: V. borealis

Binomial name
- Vanduzeeina borealis Van Duzee, 1925

Species of true bug

Vanduzeeina borealis is a species of shield-backed bug in the family Scutelleridae. It is found in North America.
