= Camirus consocius =

Scientific classification
- Domain: Eukaryota
- Kingdom: Animalia
- Phylum: Arthropoda
- Class: Insecta
- Order: Hemiptera
- Suborder: Heteroptera
- Family: Scutelleridae
- Genus: Camirus
- Species: C. consocius

Binomial name
- Camirus consocius (Uhler, 1876)

Species of true bug

Camirus consocius is a species of shield-backed bug in the family Scutelleridae. It is found in North America.
