= Symphylus caribbeanus =

Scientific classification
- Kingdom: Animalia
- Phylum: Arthropoda
- Class: Insecta
- Order: Hemiptera
- Suborder: Heteroptera
- Family: Scutelleridae
- Genus: Symphylus
- Species: S. caribbeanus

Binomial name
- Symphylus caribbeanus Kirkaldy, 1909

Species of true bug

Symphylus caribbeanus is a species of shield-backed bug in the family Scutelleridae. It is found in the Caribbean Sea and North America.
