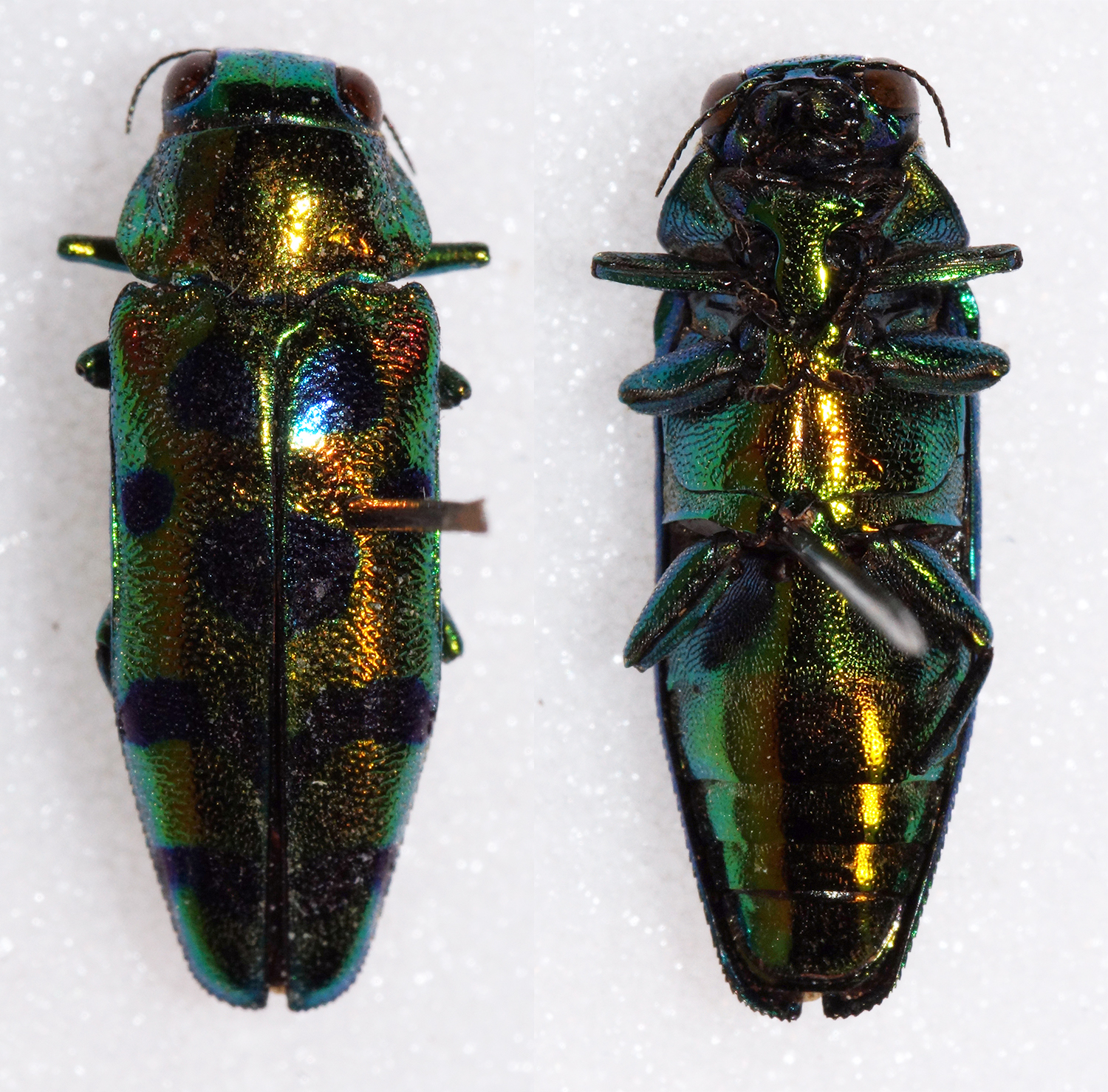
- Obenbergerula confuse

Scientific classification
- Kingdom: Animalia
- Phylum: Arthropoda
- Class: Insecta
- Order: Coleoptera
- Suborder: Polyphaga
- Infraorder: Elateriformia
- Family: Buprestidae
- Genus: Obenbergerula; Strand, 1932

= Obenbergerula =

Genus of beetles

Obenbergerula is a genus of beetles in the family Buprestidae, the jewel beetles. They are native to the Philippines. These beetles reach well over a centimeter in length and are brightly colored, usually shades of iridescent green with large spots. Their coloration is thought to be mimetic, possibly in mimicry of jewel bugs.

Species include:

- Obenbergerula confusa Bellamy, 1991
- Obenbergerula horni (Hoscheck, 1931)
- Obenbergerula paradoxa (Hoscheck, 1931)
