= Vanduzeeina slevini =

Scientific classification
- Domain: Eukaryota
- Kingdom: Animalia
- Phylum: Arthropoda
- Class: Insecta
- Order: Hemiptera
- Suborder: Heteroptera
- Family: Scutelleridae
- Genus: Vanduzeeina
- Species: V. slevini

Binomial name
- Vanduzeeina slevini Usinger, 1930

Species of true bug

Vanduzeeina slevini is a species of shield-backed bug in the family Scutelleridae. It is found in North America.
