= Euptychodera =

Scientific classification
- Domain: Eukaryota
- Kingdom: Animalia
- Phylum: Arthropoda
- Class: Insecta
- Order: Hemiptera
- Suborder: Heteroptera
- Family: Scutelleridae
- Genus: Euptychodera; Bergroth, 1908
- Species: E. corrugata

Binomial name
- Euptychodera corrugata (Van Duzee, 1904)

Genus of true bugs

Euptychodera is a genus of shield-backed bugs in the family Scutelleridae. There is one described species in Euptychodera, E. corrugata.
