= Calidea panaethiopica =

Scientific classification
- Kingdom: Animalia
- Phylum: Arthropoda
- Clade: Pancrustacea
- Class: Insecta
- Order: Hemiptera
- Suborder: Heteroptera
- Family: Scutelleridae
- Genus: Calidea
- Species: C. panaethiopica

Binomial name
- Calidea panaethiopica Kirkaldy, 1909

Species of insect

Calidea panaethiopica, also known as the African shield-backed bug, is a species of polyphagous heteropteran insect in the family Scutelleridae. C. panaethiopica is highly colorful, with iridescent blue, green, and yellow colors, created in part by microscopic pits in its shield that reflect light in the pattern of a dielectric mirror. It feeds on fluids from stems, leaves, and fruit of herbaceous plants across Africa, and is considered an agriculture pest in some localities. C. panaethiopica eggs are parasitized by some hymenopteran wasps.

== Anatomy ==
Though it resembles beetles, C. panaethiopica is a shield-bug, characterized by a single dorsal cuticular plate in the shape of a heraldic shield. It possesses a single pair of wings protected beneath the shield that can be unfolded on either side for flight. It feeds on herbaceous tissue fluids using sucking mouth parts, known as a stinging or sucking rostrum.

The shield cuticle is characterized by repeated hemispherical dips between 10-20 microns in depth that reflect blue light from their margins, and yellow light from their centers, using the mechanism of a dielectric mirror. The overall effect is an intense and iridescent green.

== Ecology ==
C. panaethiopica feed intensively on species of the genus Jatropha. Some species occur naturally throughout Africa, but South American species like Jatropha curcas are also cultivated for medicinal seeds and fuel oil after introduction by Portuguese sailors in the 1500s. J. curcas oil is known to have antimicrobial and antifungal properties among others. C. panaethiopica lays it eggs on the inner face of Jatropha leaves, and larvae and adults then feed on these leaves, leaving brown spots and causing the leaves to desiccate. C. panaethiopica on J. curcas leaves can also cause flower and fruit abortion.

C. panaethiopica eggs can be parasitized by Scelionidae wasps including Trissolcus basalis, Psixstriaticeps, and Gryon. They are also preyed upon by Araneae, Tarachodidae and Mantidae predators.
