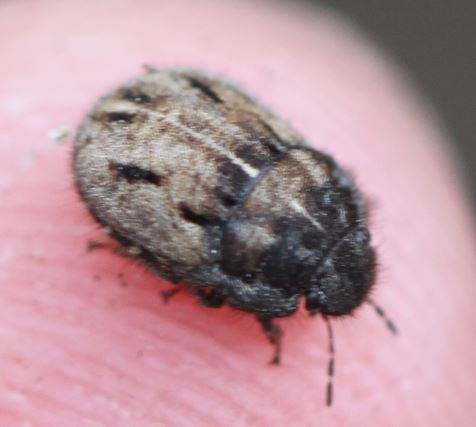

Scientific classification
- Domain: Eukaryota
- Kingdom: Animalia
- Phylum: Arthropoda
- Class: Insecta
- Order: Hemiptera
- Suborder: Heteroptera
- Family: Scutelleridae
- Genus: Odontoscelis; Laporte, 1833

= Odontoscelis =

Genus of true bugs

Odontoscelis is a genus of true bugs belonging to the family Scutelleridae.

Several species of this genus are found in Europe.

== Species ==
BioLib includes:

- Odontoscelis byrrhus Seidenstücker, 1972
- Odontoscelis dorsalis (Fabricius, 1798)
- Odontoscelis fuliginosa (Linnaeus, 1761)
- Odontoscelis hispanica Göllner-Scheiding, 1987
- Odontoscelis hispidula Jakovlev, 1874
- Odontoscelis lineola Rambur, 1839
- Odontoscelis litura (Fabricius, 1775)
- Odontoscelis minuta Jakovlev, 1881
- Odontoscelis montandoni Kis, 1979
- Odontoscelis signata Fieber, 1861
- Odontoscelis tomentosa (Germar, 1839)
- Odontoscelis vittata Horváth, 1911
- Odontoscelis zarudnyi V.G. Putshkov, 1965
