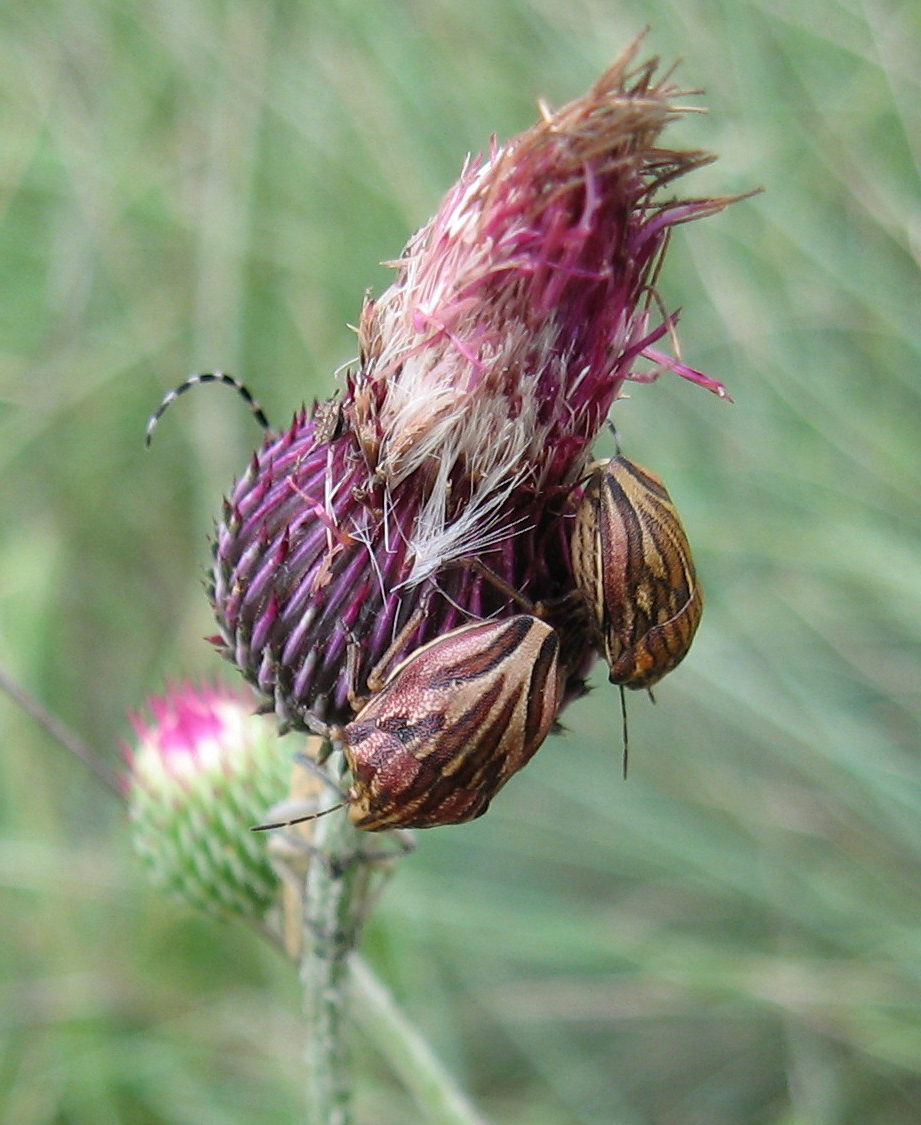
- Odontotarsus purpureolineatus

Scientific classification
- Domain: Eukaryota
- Kingdom: Animalia
- Phylum: Arthropoda
- Class: Insecta
- Order: Hemiptera
- Suborder: Heteroptera
- Family: Scutelleridae
- Subfamily: Odontotarsinae
- Genus: Odontotarsus; Laporte, 1833

= Odontotarsus =

Genus of true bugs

External image
- Images at iNaturalist

Odontotarsus is a genus of mostly Palaearctic jewel or shield-backed bugs, that is typical of the subfamily Odontotarsinae and tribe Odontotarsini; it was erected by Laporte in 1833. Records of occurrence include southern Africa and mainland Europe. Odontotarsus grammicus is one of the sunn pest species.

== Species ==
The following are included in BioLib.cz:

1. Odontotarsus angustatus Jakovlev, 1883
2. Odontotarsus armiger Kiritshenko, 1914
3. Odontotarsus callosus Horváth, 1896
4. Odontotarsus caudatus (Burmeister, 1835)
5. Odontotarsus druryi Distant, 1910
6. Odontotarsus freyi Puton, 1882
7. Odontotarsus grammicus (Linnaeus, 1767)
8. Odontotarsus impictus Jakovlev, 1886
9. Odontotarsus intermedius Horváth, 1923
10. Odontotarsus latissimus Göllner-Scheiding, 1990
11. Odontotarsus obsoletus Horváth, 1906
12. Odontotarsus oculatus Horváth, 1882
13. Odontotarsus parvulus Horváth, 1917
14. Odontotarsus plicatulus Horváth, 1906
15. Odontotarsus purpureolineatus (Rossi, 1790)
16. Odontotarsus robustus Jakovlev, 1883
17. Odontotarsus rufescens Fieber, 1861
