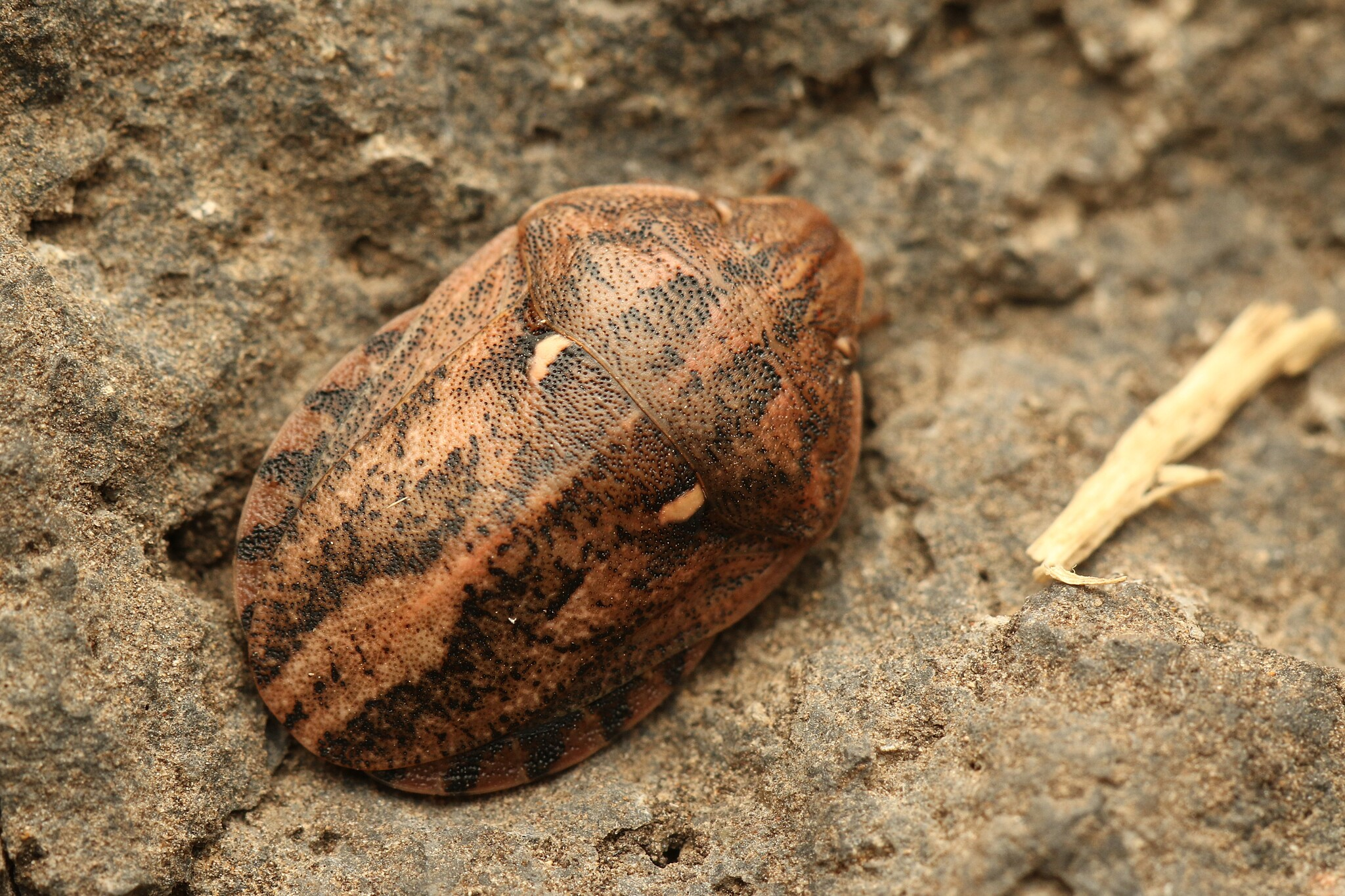
- Eurygaster integriceps in Israel

Scientific classification
- Kingdom: Animalia
- Phylum: Arthropoda
- Clade: Pancrustacea
- Class: Insecta
- Order: Hemiptera
- Suborder: Heteroptera
- Family: Scutelleridae
- Genus: Eurygaster
- Species: E. integriceps

Binomial name
- Eurygaster integriceps Puton, 1881

= Eurygaster integriceps =

Species of true bug

Eurygaster integriceps is a species of shield bug in the family Scutelleridae, commonly known as the sunn pest or corn bug. It is native to much of northern Africa, the Balkans and western and central Asia. It is a major pest of cereal crops especially wheat, barley and oats.

== Morphology and biology ==
The colour of the sunn pest varies but it is usually light brown. The body is a broad oval about 12 millimetres (0.5 in) long. The scutellum is wide and chitinous and covers the wings and the whole abdomen. The insect lives for about a month during which time the females lay twenty eight to forty two eggs. These are laid in batches each having two neat rows of seven eggs, on the underside of leaves and on the stems of the host plant, or sometimes on weeds. The eggs take six to twenty eight days to hatch and the nymphs moult five times while they feed on the leaves, stems and ears of cereal crops for the next twenty to forty five days. They grow fastest at an air temperature of 20–24 °C (68–75 °F). The second and third instars have a pale abdomen and dark head and thorax. The fourth instar has the rudiments of fore wings and the fifth instar, the rudiments of hind wings as well.

== Distribution ==
The sunn pest is found in Northern Africa, Albania, Greece, Bulgaria and Romania. In Asia it occurs in Turkey, Syria, Lebanon, Iran, Iraq, Afghanistan and Pakistan and the republics of Kazakhstan, Kyrgyzstan, Tajikistan, Turkmenistan and Uzbekistan. In Russia it has spread into the central and Volga Basin regions, the Northern Caucasus, the Chelyabinsk region and Bashkortostan.

== Ecology ==
The adults mostly overwinter in leaf litter in woods but some find refuge among rough vegetation. When the temperature reaches about 13 °C (55 °F) they seek out cereal crops, start to feed on the stems, leaves and developing seed heads, mate and lay their eggs. There is only one generation each year so adults and nymphs can be found feeding together on the ripening grain. If the insects are not fully developed when the crop is harvested, some nymphs and young adults feed and mature on fallen grain and other crop residues before flying off to their winter quarters. In Syria, they spend about nine months in hibernation.

== Economic significance ==
Over fifteen million hectares in the affected areas of west and central Asia suffer from infestations with this pest. The number of pests varies enormously from year to year and a significant attack may occur about once in every seven years, potentially causing yield losses worth tens of millions of dollars. The loss in yield of grain has been estimated at 50–90% in wheat and 20–30% in barley. While feeding, the sunn bugs inject proteolytic and amylolytic enzymes into the wheat causing breakdown of the gluten which reduces the quality of the flour resulting in the production of inferior dough. Traditional control methods include the early application of fertilizer on winter crops, the early sowing of spring crops, the selection of varieties resistant to the pest and varieties that ripen early and can be harvested early, autumn ploughing in of crop residues and the spraying of crops with pesticides, which should only be done when pest populations rise to economically damaging levels.

== Integrated pest management ==
Researchers at the Entomology Research Laboratory at the University of Vermont and agricultural researchers working throughout the infested region have been co-operating since 1997 to produce an integrated management plan for the sunn pest. Various on-going research projects are taking place. Additionally, an international forum, SunnPestNet, has been set up to improve communication between researchers and agriculturalists from all over the world.

Research is being undertaken at the Natural Resources Institute at the University of Greenwich. This project aims to assess the economic thresholds for pest populations, the possible role of egg parasitoids and the possible use of pathogenic fungi to control the pests. Also being investigated is the role of semiochemicals in enabling individual bugs to locate potential mates and suitable host plants, and whether such chemicals could be used as a possible means of control. There is also an initiative to identify resistant strains of cultivated and wild cereals with the objective of developing the germplasm.

A study published in 2008 identified several entomopathogenic nematodes that showed promise as biocontrol agents.
