= Dystus =

Scientific classification
- Kingdom: Animalia
- Phylum: Arthropoda
- Clade: Pancrustacea
- Class: Insecta
- Order: Hemiptera
- Suborder: Heteroptera
- Family: Scutelleridae
- Subfamily: Pachycorinae
- Genus: Dystus; Stål, 1862

Genus of insects

External image
- Images at iNaturalist

Dystus is a genus of central American bugs in the subfamily Pachycorinae, erected by Carl Stål in 1862.

== Species ==
GBIF includes:

1. Dystus puberulus Stal, 1862
2. Dystus villosus Breddin, 1904
