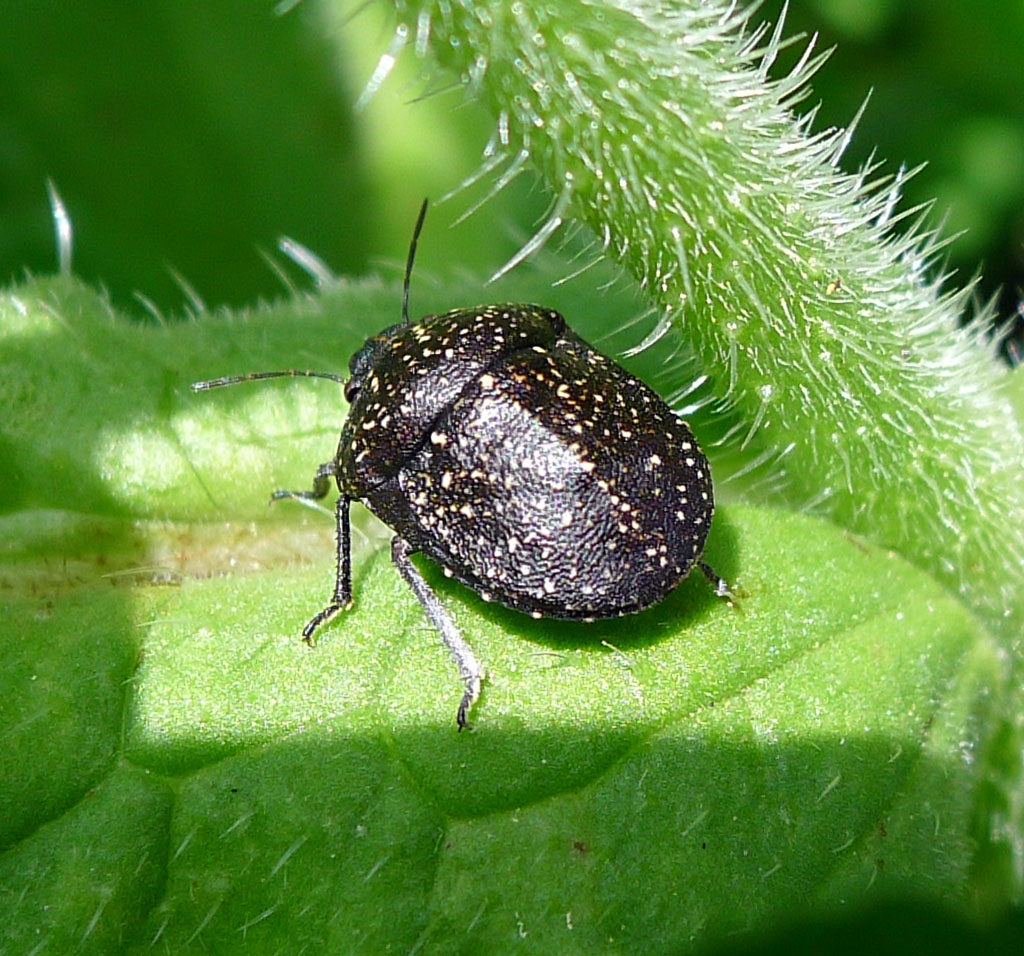
- Psacasta exanthematica

Scientific classification
- Domain: Eukaryota
- Kingdom: Animalia
- Phylum: Arthropoda
- Class: Insecta
- Order: Hemiptera
- Suborder: Heteroptera
- Family: Scutelleridae
- Subfamily: Eurygastrinae
- Genus: Psacasta; Germar, 1839

= Psacasta =

Genus of true bugs

External image
- Images at iNaturalist

Psacasta is a genus of Palaearctic jewel or shield-backed bugs in the subfamily Eurygastrinae and typical of the tribe Psacastini; the genus was erected by Ernst Friedrich Germar in 1839.

== Species ==
The following are included in BioLib.cz:

subgenus Cryptodontus Mulsant & Rey, 1866

1. Psacasta neglecta (Herrich-Schäffer, 1837)
2. Psacasta tuberculata (Fabricius, 1781)

subgenus Psacasta Germar, 1839

1. Psacasta cypria Puton, 1881
2. Psacasta exanthematica (Scopoli, 1763)
3. Psacasta granulata (A.Costa, 1847)
4. Psacasta herculeana Horváth, 1891
5. Psacasta horvathi Royer, 1923
6. Psacasta pallida Reuter, 1902
7. Psacasta simillima Horváth, 1917
