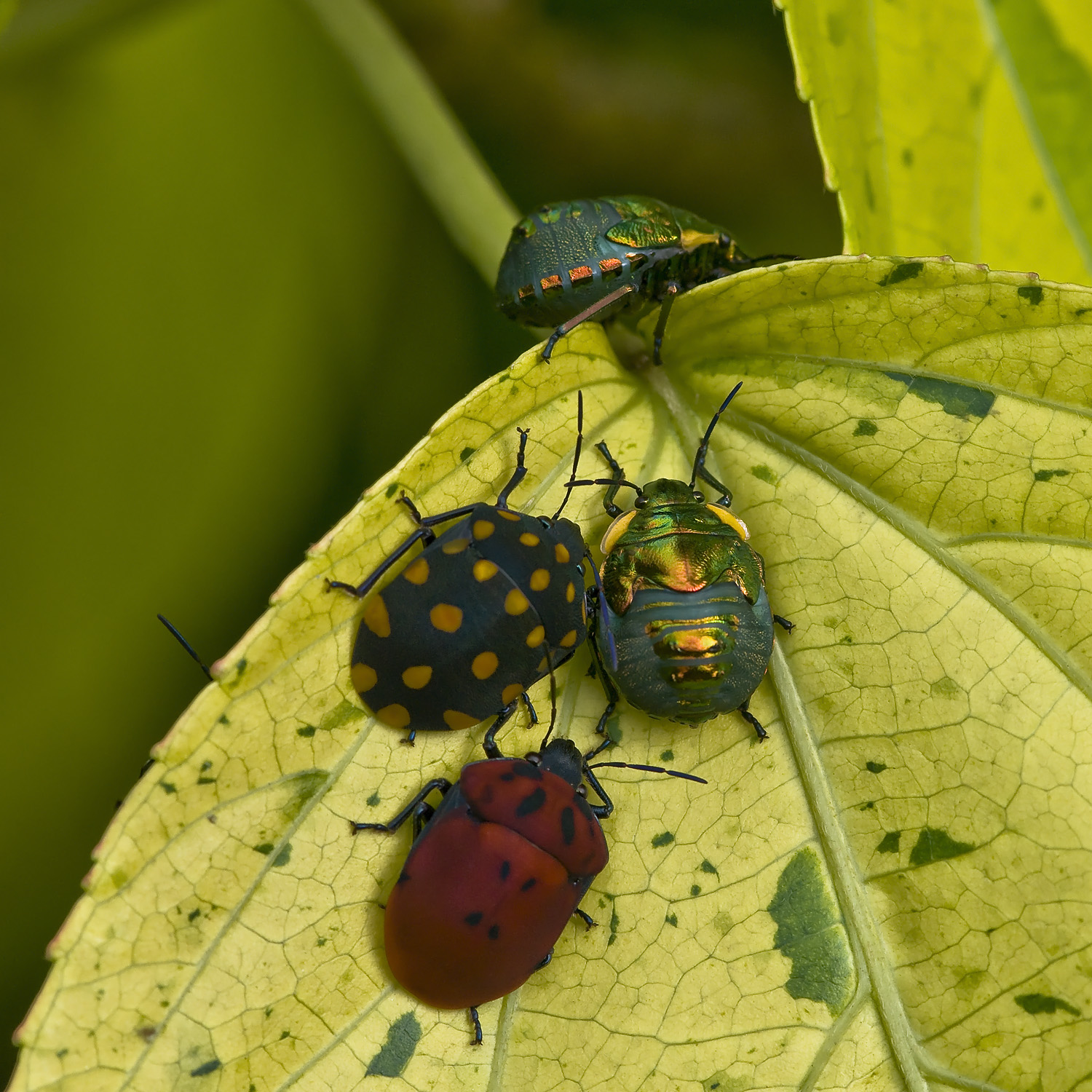
- Pachycoris torridus adults and nymphs

Scientific classification
- Kingdom: Animalia
- Phylum: Arthropoda
- Class: Insecta
- Order: Hemiptera
- Suborder: Heteroptera
- Family: Scutelleridae
- Subfamily: Pachycorinae
- Genus: Pachycoris; Burmeister, 1835

= Pachycoris =

Genus of true bugs

Pachycoris is a genus of true bugs in the family Scutelleridae, subfamily Pachycorinae, found in the Americas. The genus was erected by Hermann Burmeister in 1835.

== Description ==
Pachycoris adults often have large bright spots and species generally feed on plants in the Euphorbiaceae, such as Cnidoscolus, Croton, and Jatropha.

Eggs are laid in masses and nymphs are usually gregarious in the early instars. Maternal care has been observed in several species.

== Species ==
GBIF includes:

1. Pachycoris aquila Herrich-Schäffer, 1839 (Thunberg, 1783)
2. Pachycoris burmeisteri Heer, 1864 (Westwood, 1837)
3. Pachycoris escheri Heer, 1853
4. Pachycoris fabricii (Burmeister, 1835)
5. Pachycoris germari Heer, 1853
6. Pachycoris klugii Burmeister, 1835
7. Pachycoris lineatus Herrich-Schäffer, 1836
8. Pachycoris mexicanus Herrich-Schäffer, 1837
9. Pachycoris obscuratus Herrich-Schäffer, 1838
10. Pachycoris protogaeus Heer, 1853
11. Pachycoris torridus (Scopoli, 1772)
