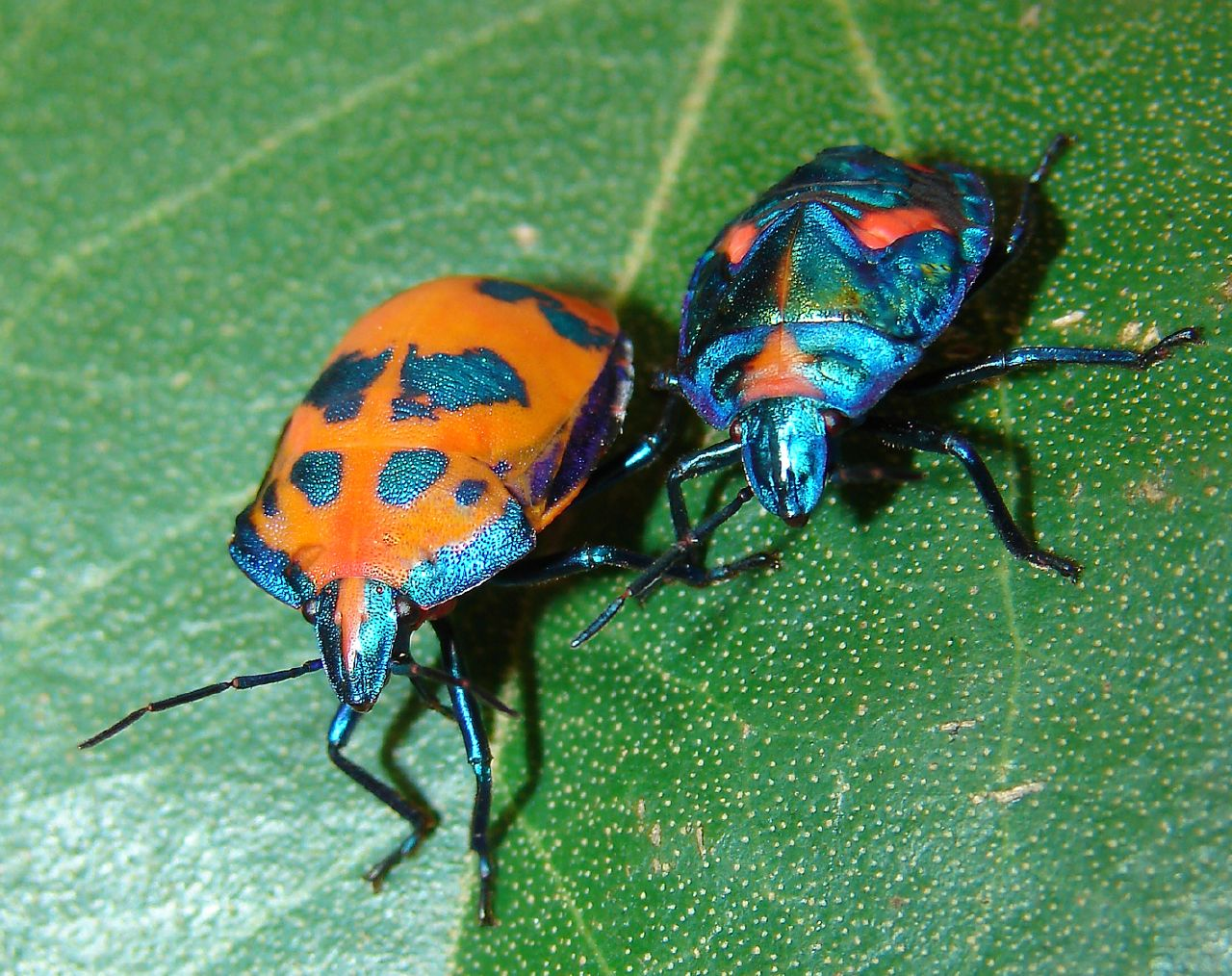
- Adult female and nymph

Scientific classification
- Kingdom: Animalia
- Phylum: Arthropoda
- Class: Insecta
- Order: Hemiptera
- Suborder: Heteroptera
- Superfamily: Pentatomoidea
- Family: Scutelleridae
- Genus: Tectocoris
- Species: T. diophthalmus

Binomial name
- Tectocoris diophthalmus (Thunberg, 1783)

Synonyms
- Cimex lineola Fabricius, 1781 (homonym); Cimex diophthalmus Thunberg, 1783; Tetyra lineola Fabricius, 1803; Tetyra cyanipes Fabricius, 1803; Cimex banksii Donovan, 1805; Scutellera schoenherri Eschscholtz, 1822; Scutellera banksii Guerin, 1838; Scutellera cyanipes (Fabricius, 1803); Scutellera cyanipoda Boisduval, 1835; Scutellera tongae Boisduval, 1835; Tectocoris gambiae Westwood, 1837; Pachycoris lineola (Fabricius, 1803); Scutellera cyanipes (Fabricius, 1803); Tectocoris lineola (Fabricius, 1803); Tectocoris banksii (Donovan, 1805); Tectocoris cyanipes (Fabricius, 1803); Tectocoris bancksii Montrouzier, 1861 (Lapsus); Tectocoris obliquus Walker, 1867; Tectocoris pusillus Walker, 1867; Tectocoris amboinensis Walker, 1867; Tectocoris diophthalmus rufus Stål, 1871; Tectocoris diophthalmus tagalicus Stål, 1871; Tectocoris diophthalmus schoenherri (Eschscholtz, 1822); Tectocoris lineola banksi Dodd, 1904 (Lapsus); Tectocoris diophthalmus cookiana Kirkaldy, 1909; Tectocoris diophthalmus peregrina Kirkaldy, 1909; Tectocoris diophthalmus venusta Kirkaldy, 1909; Tectocoris purpureus Knight et al., 1985 (Lapsus)

= Tectocoris =

Monotypic genus of true bug

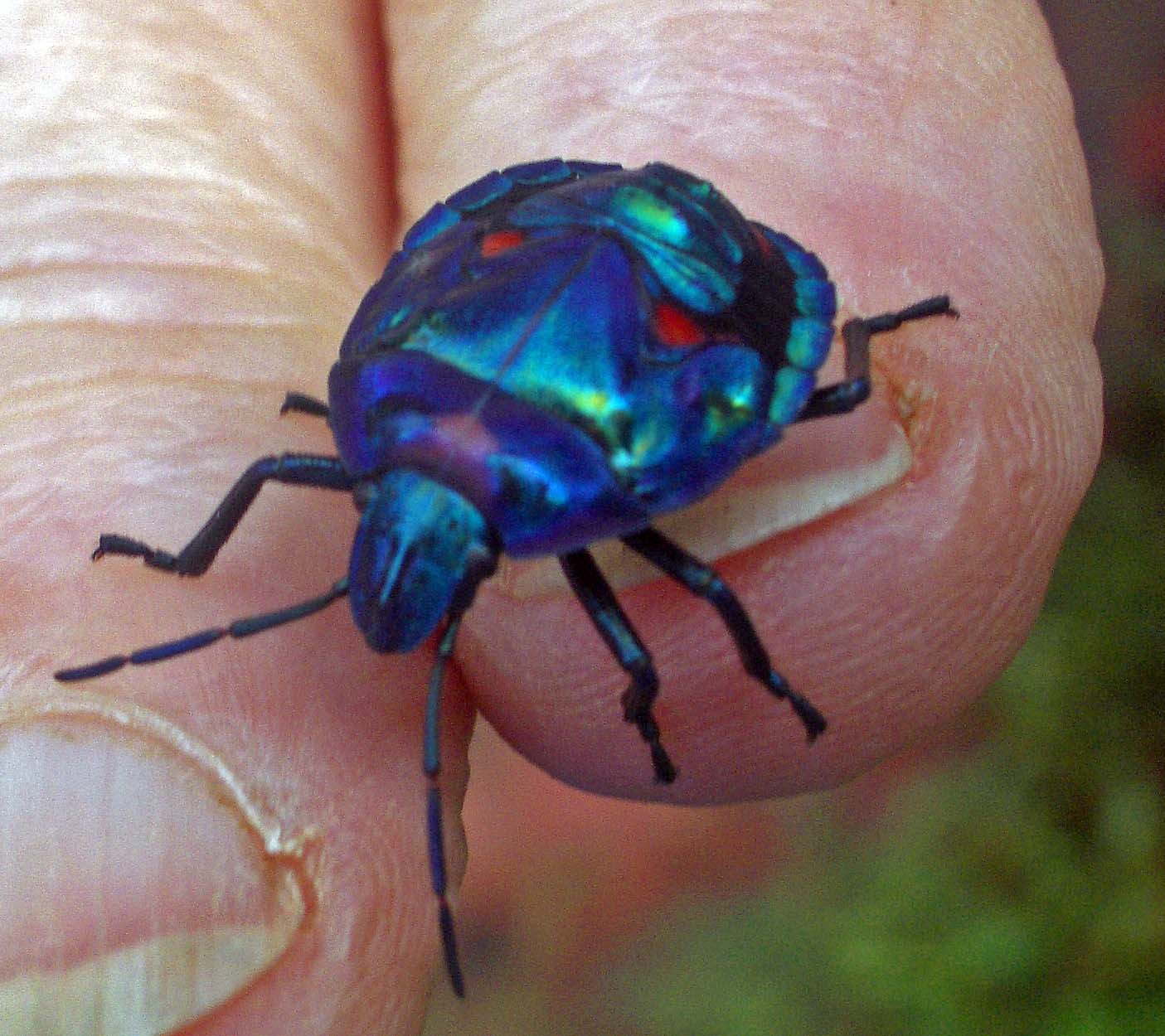
nymph, near Cooktown, Australia.

Tectocoris diophthalmus, commonly known as the hibiscus harlequin bug or cotton harlequin bug, is the sole member of the genus Tectocoris and subfamily Tectocorinae. It is a brightly coloured convex and rounded shield-shaped bug with a metallic sheen that grows to about 20 mm. Adult females are mostly orange and males are both blue and red or orange, while nymphs are typically metallic green and purple. The colours are quite variable, and experiments suggest that the variation in colour may reduce bird predation, especially on the immature stages. This extreme level of variation is such that different taxonomists have, since 1781, described this species under different new names at least 16 times, some of these supernumerary names remaining in use until 2006, when it was finally confirmed that they were all colour forms of a single organism. It is common in Eastern Australia, New Guinea and several Pacific Islands in habitats ranging from urban to agricultural and coastal areas.

Hibiscus harlequin bugs feed on many species of the family Malvaceae, as well as cultivated cotton. They will also feed on Illawarra flame tree flowers, Grevillea and bottlebrush saplings.

They pierce the stems of young shoots and suck the sap. Females lay clusters of eggs around stems of usually the hibiscus plant and then guards them until they hatch.

== Gallery ==
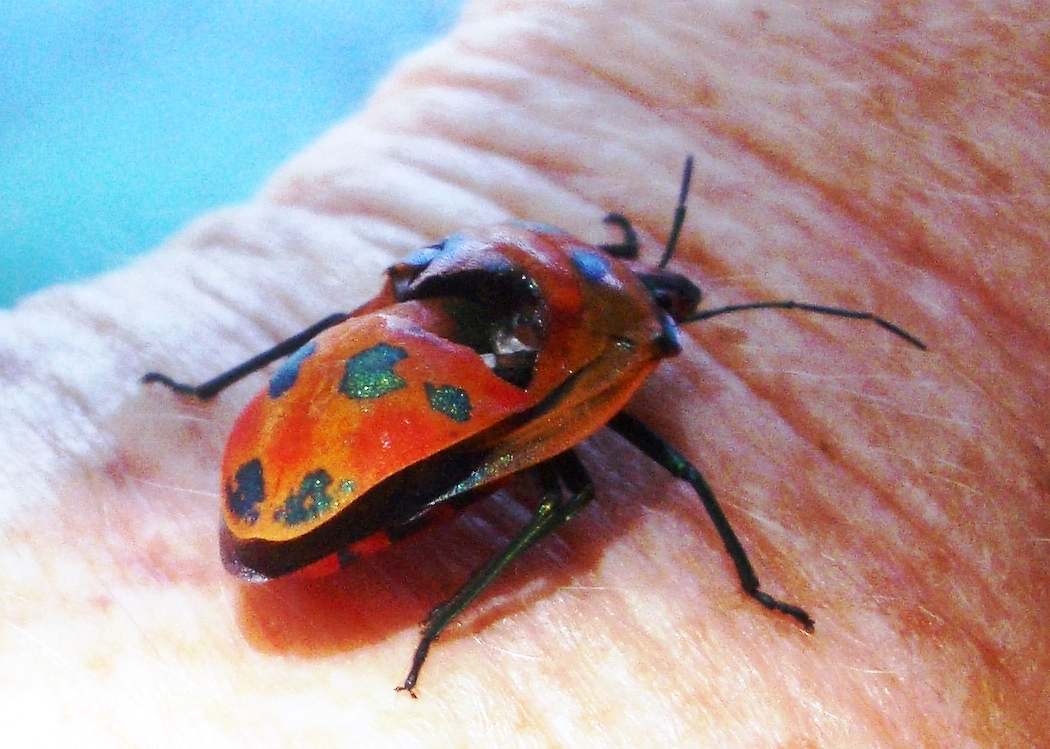
Cotton Harlequin Bug. Cooktown

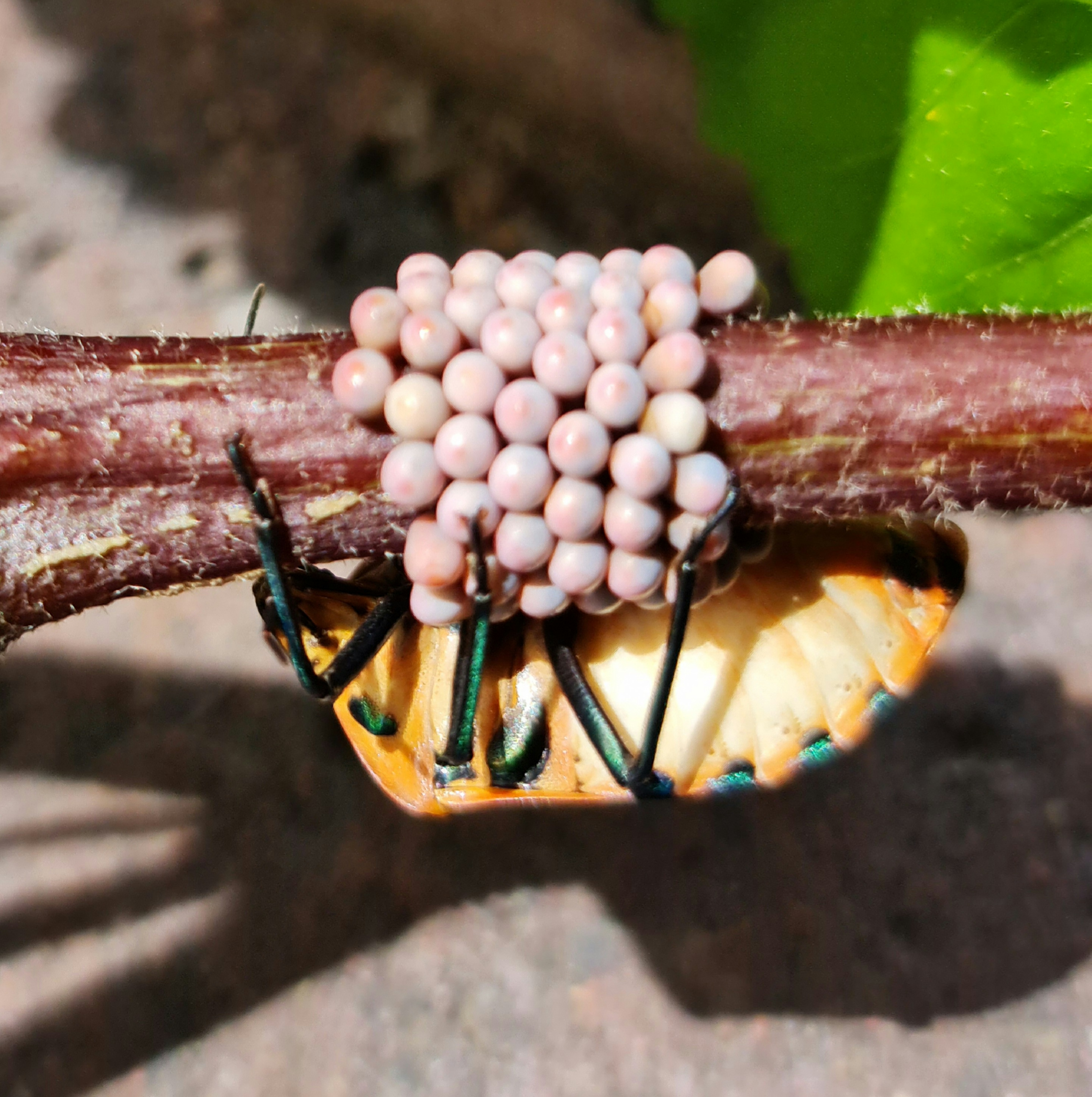
adult female guarding eggs

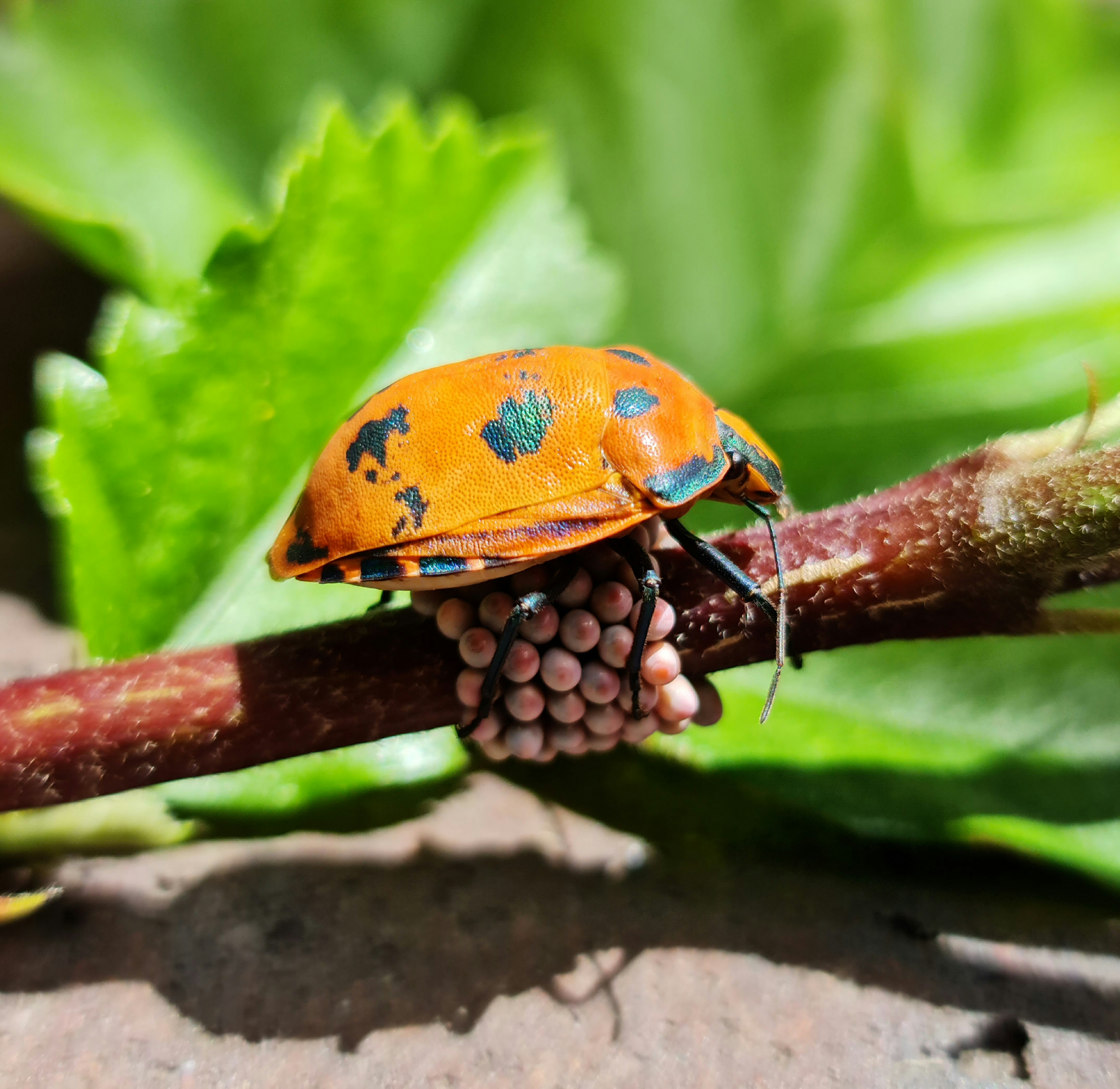
adult female with eggs

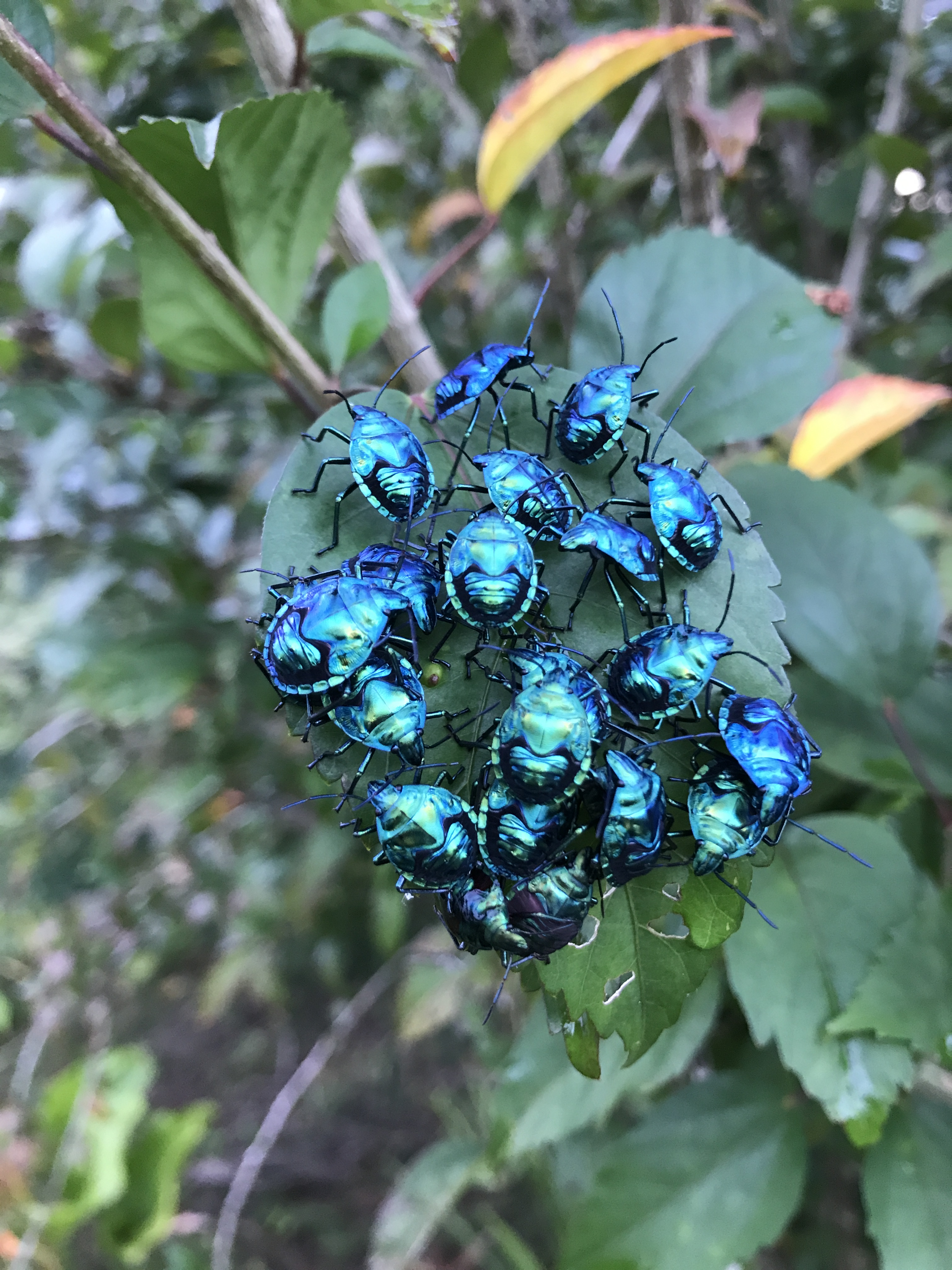
This group is all blue, when typically they are a mix of blue and orange.

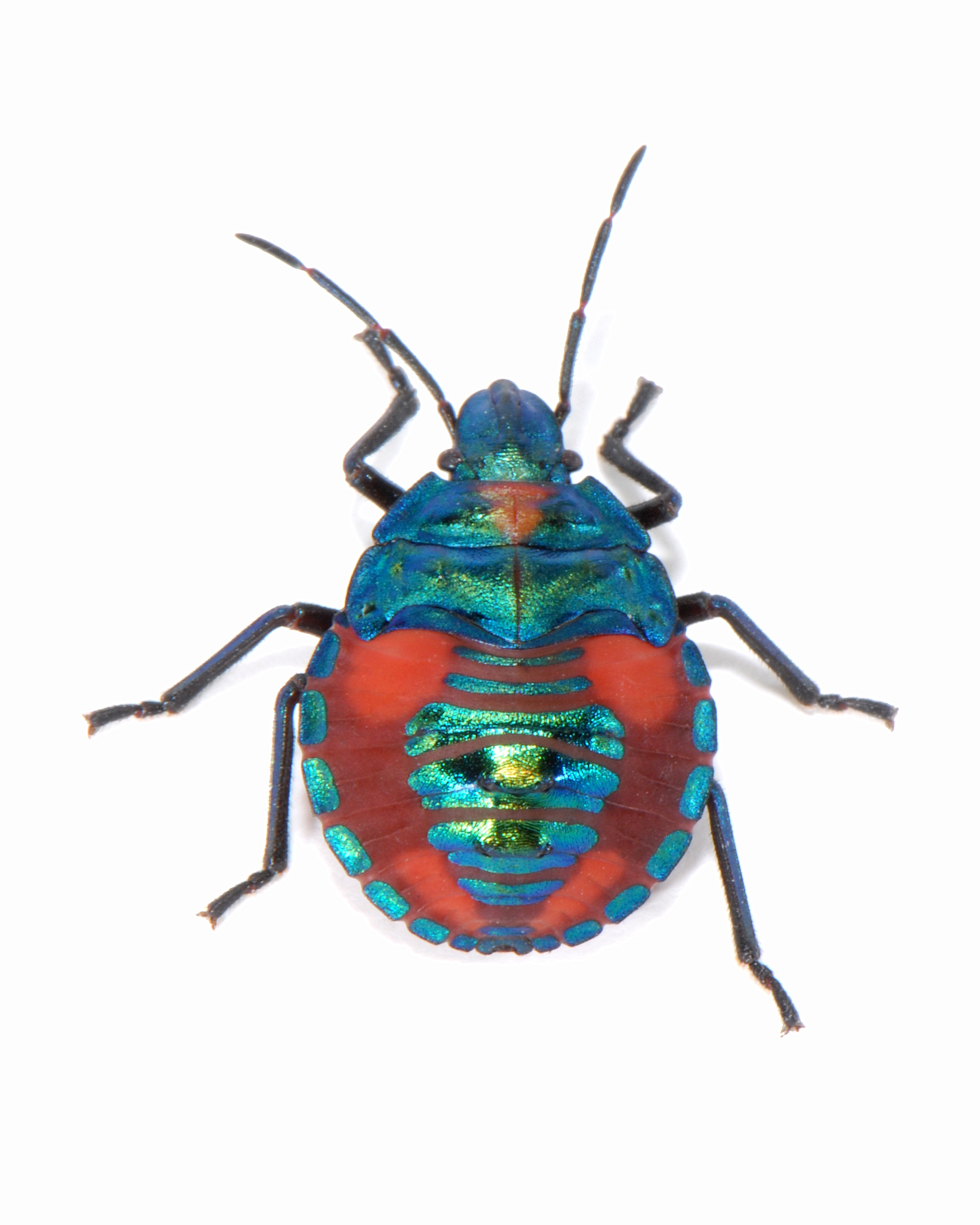
Dorsal view
