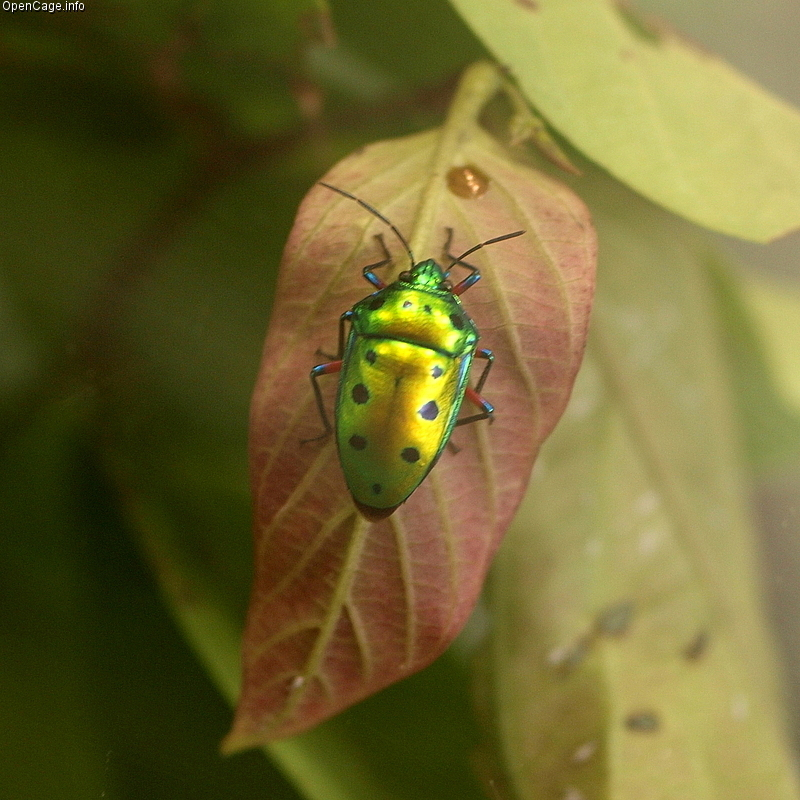
- Dorsal view

Scientific classification
- Domain: Eukaryota
- Kingdom: Animalia
- Phylum: Arthropoda
- Class: Insecta
- Order: Hemiptera
- Suborder: Heteroptera
- Family: Scutelleridae
- Subfamily: Scutellerinae
- Tribe: Scutellerini
- Genus: Calliphara
- Species: C. excellens

Binomial name
- Calliphara excellens ((Burmeister, 1834)

Synonyms
- Tetyra excellens Burmeister, 1834; Tectocoris obscura Westwood, 1837; Callidea nobilis Germar, 1839; Calliphara obscura Sharp, 1890

= Calliphara excellens =

Species of true bug

Calliphara excellens is a jewel bug in the family Scutelleridae. It is distributed in Nepal and India. Males engage in ritualistic Courtship display, walking around the female, touching his abdomen to the plant before touching the female's antennae. After mating, the female oviposits into the seed of a host plant, such as Macaranga tanarius.
