= Vanduzeeina =

Scientific classification
- Domain: Eukaryota
- Kingdom: Animalia
- Phylum: Arthropoda
- Class: Insecta
- Order: Hemiptera
- Suborder: Heteroptera
- Family: Scutelleridae
- Subfamily: Odontotarsinae
- Genus: Vanduzeeina; Schouteden, 1904

Genus of true bugs

Vanduzeeina is a genus of shield-backed bugs in the family Scutelleridae. There are about five described species in Vanduzeeina.

== Species ==
These five species belong to the genus Vanduzeeina:

- Vanduzeeina balli (Van Duzee, 1904)
- Vanduzeeina borealis Van Duzee, 1925
- Vanduzeeina californica Van Duzee, 1925
- Vanduzeeina senescens Usinger, 1930
- Vanduzeeina slevini Usinger, 1930
