= Fokkeria =

Scientific classification
- Domain: Eukaryota
- Kingdom: Animalia
- Phylum: Arthropoda
- Class: Insecta
- Order: Hemiptera
- Suborder: Heteroptera
- Family: Scutelleridae
- Genus: Fokkeria; Schouteden, 1904
- Species: F. producta

Binomial name
- Fokkeria producta (Van Duzee, 1904)

Genus of true bugs

Fokkeria is a genus of shield-backed bugs in the family Scutelleridae. There is one described species in Fokkeria, F. producta.
