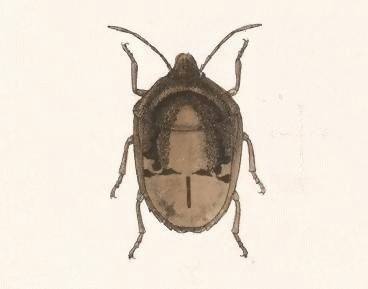
- Symphylus deplanatus

Scientific classification
- Domain: Eukaryota
- Kingdom: Animalia
- Phylum: Arthropoda
- Class: Insecta
- Order: Hemiptera
- Suborder: Heteroptera
- Family: Scutelleridae
- Subfamily: Pachycorinae
- Genus: Symphylus; Dallas, 1851

= Symphylus =

Genus of true bugs

Symphylus is a genus of shield-backed bugs in the family Scutelleridae. There are at least four described species in Symphylus.

== Species ==
These four species belong to the genus Symphylus:

- Symphylus caribbeanus Kirkaldy, 1909
- Symphylus cyphonoides (Walker, 1867)
- Symphylus deplanatus (Herrich-Schäffer, 1837)
- Symphylus obtusus Dallas, 1851
