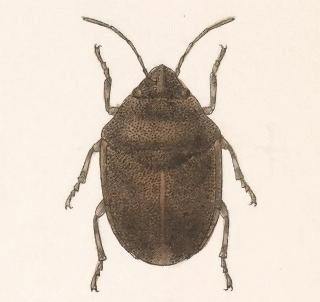

Scientific classification
- Kingdom: Animalia
- Phylum: Arthropoda
- Clade: Pancrustacea
- Class: Insecta
- Order: Hemiptera
- Suborder: Heteroptera
- Family: Scutelleridae
- Subfamily: Pachycorinae
- Genus: Camirus; Stål, 1862

= Camirus (bug) =

Genus of true bugs

Camirus is a genus of shield-backed bugs in the family Scutelleridae. There are at least four described species in Camirus.

== Species ==
These four species belong to the genus Camirus:

- Camirus conicus (Germar, 1839)^{g}
- Camirus consocius (Uhler, 1876)^{i c g b}
- Camirus moestus (Stål, 1862)^{i c g}
- Camirus porosus (Germar, 1839)^{i c g}

Data sources: i = ITIS, c = Catalogue of Life, g = GBIF, b = Bugguide.net
