= Sunn pest =

Common name for certain true bugs

Common sunn pests

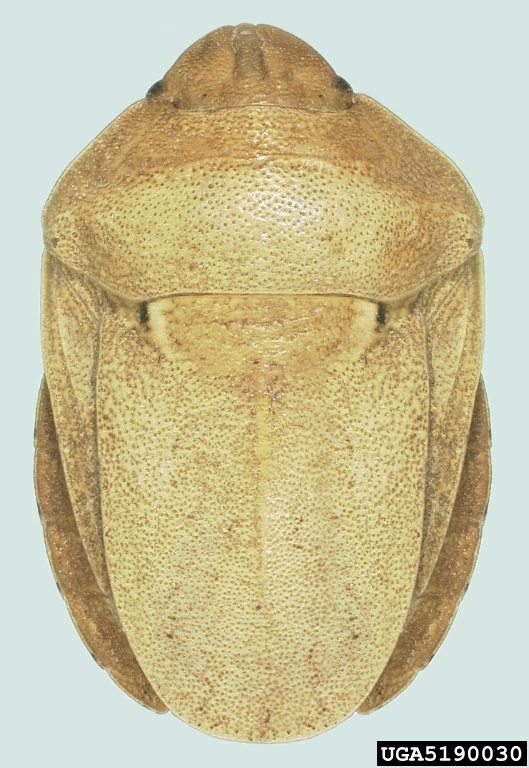
Eurygaster integriceps

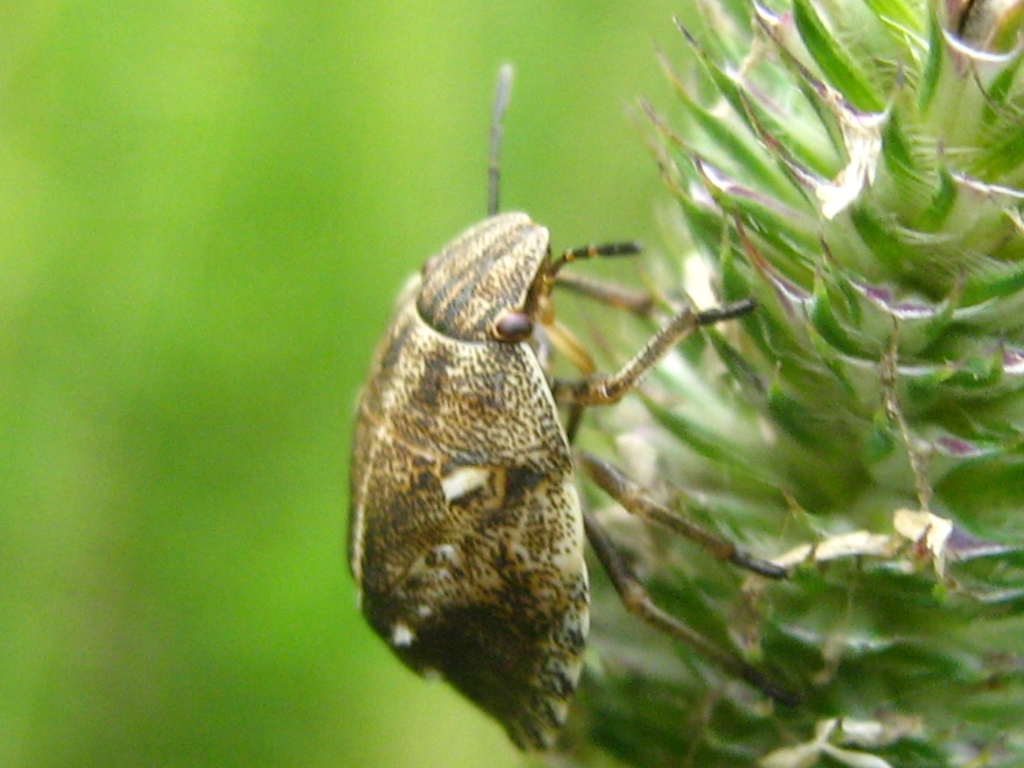
Eurygaster testudinaria

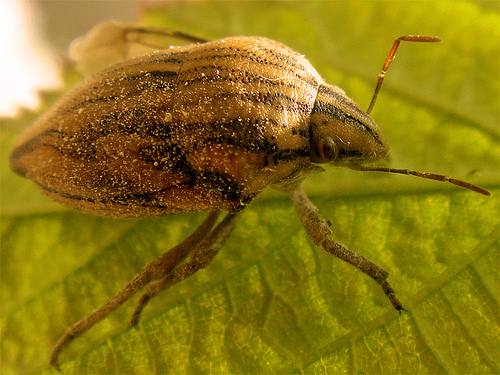
Odontotarsus grammicus

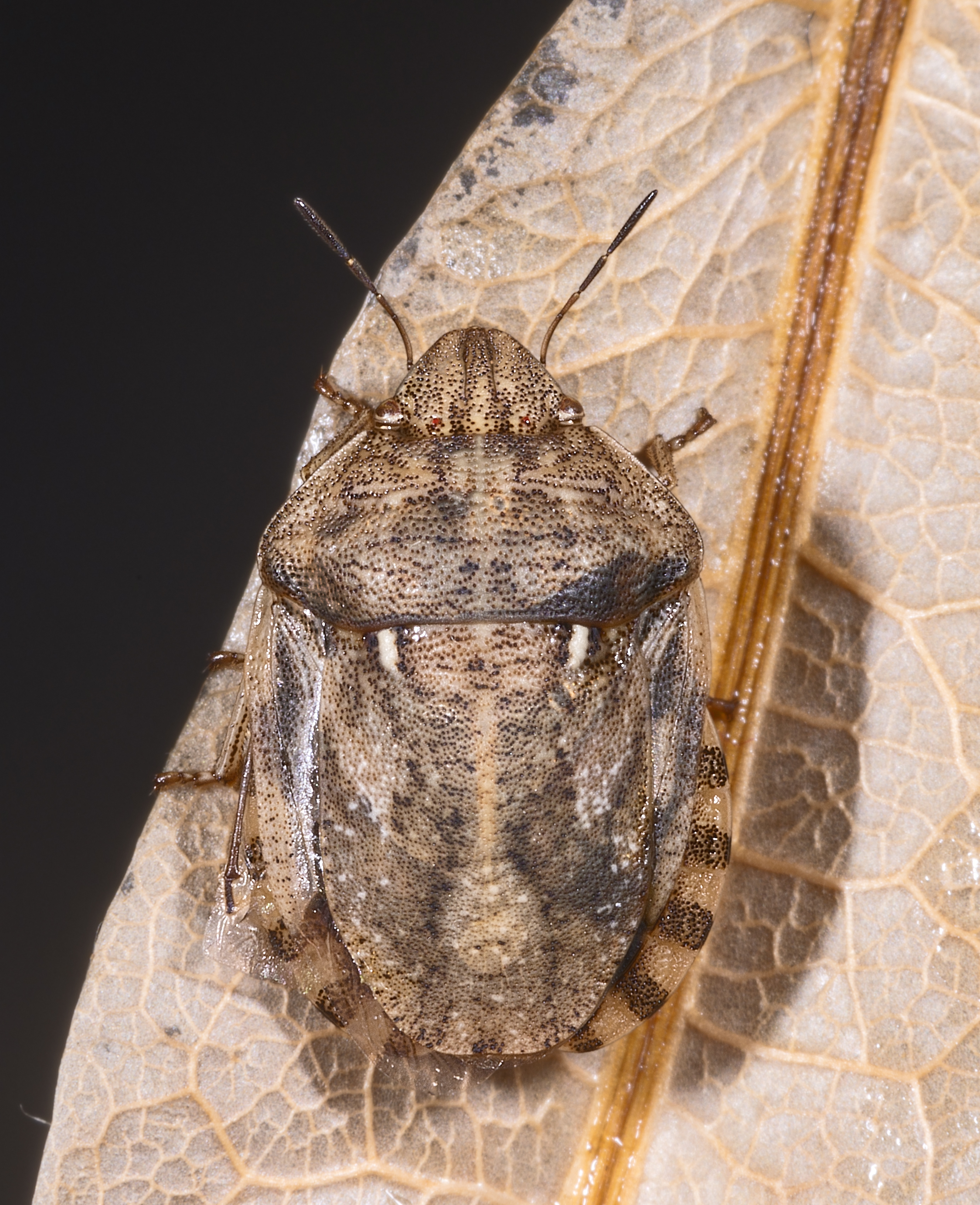
Eurygaster maura

Sunn pests are grain insect pests belonging to several genera of the 'shield bug' family Scutelleridae, with the species Eurygaster integriceps being the most economically important. Sunn pests are found in parts of North Africa, throughout West Asia and many of the new independent states of Central Asia.

The sunn pest is one of the most serious pests of wheat and barley in West Asia, where over $42 million (U.S.) is spent for its control. Yield loss from its damage has been estimated at 20-30% in barley and 50-90% in wheat. This insect damages these crops by feeding on leaves, stems and grains. During feeding they also inject chemicals that greatly reduce the baking quality of flour made from damaged wheat. If 2-3% of the grain is damaged, entire lots may be ruined because the flour will be unpalatable and the bread will not rise. Heavy attack causes wheat stems to break before harvest.

Large areas of wheat sometimes remain unharvested because sunn pest damage is so severe. These insects also attack barley, though damage is usually low. Large outbreaks of sunn pests generally occur every 6 to 8 years and can potentially cause yield losses of tens of millions of dollars.

== Sunn pest management ==
Currently, there is not a pest management strategy to control the sunn pest on a national or global scale. However, there are a number of methods that farmers can utilize to help limit the damage caused by these insects.

1. Monitor pest populations; sunn pest populations vary from year to year in response to climatic conditions. Pest populations should be monitored annually to determine if it is necessary to spray for the insect. Keeping records of population levels is beneficial.
2. Plant early-maturing wheat varieties and harvest early; damage is less if wheat is harvested before sunn pest reach adulthood. Growing early-maturing varieties and establishing a regional uniform planting date minimizes damage. Early harvesting methods must be developed in relation to local production methods and weather conditions.
3. Maintain shelter belts around wheat fields. Natural enemies reduce sunn pest populations and should be encouraged. Cereal crops should not be grown on marginal lands in the foothills. These areas should remain as uncultivated habitats where flowers and grow undisturbed, providing shelter and alternative food sources, which improve survival of these beneficial insects.
4. Use chemical insecticides only if needed.

Selective insecticides should only be used when pest populations reach economically damaging levels. Applications should be made when adults move into cereal fields. Research has been ongoing for decades to develop and improve management of the sunn pest. In 1997, scientists from the International Center for Agricultural Research in the Dry Areas (ICARDA), the University of Vermont, and national agricultural researchers throughout the infested region began working together to develop a model sunn pest integrated management plan.

== Sunn pest research ==
A cooperative program between the University of Vermont Entomology Research Laboratory and the International Center for Agricultural Research in the Dry Areas (ICARDA), in Aleppo, Syria was initiated in 1997. Several strains of entomopathogenic fungi have been isolated from insects in their over wintering sites in Turkey, Syria, Kazakhstan, Kyrgyzstan, Uzbekistan and Russia. In laboratory bioassays, they were tested against sunn pests, tarnished plant bug and western flower thrips. Several were highly pathogenic to all of these insects, and selected for further evaluation.

The next step in the development of these biological agents is to determine at what stage in the pests' life cycle fungi could best be used. Two possibilities are

1. As they migrate to the fields in the early spring
2. In their over wintering sites among the foothills surrounding the fields.

Six of the most promising isolates were tested in on-plant and in-litter bioassays in January 2000. Several of the tested isolates provided 80-100% mortality within 10 days. Though sunn pest mortality occurred more rapidly among the in-litter assays, by day 15 sunn pest mortality was equally high in the on-plant assays. These results demonstrate the great potential of fungi for sunn pest integrated pest management. It may be possible to use them both in overwintering sites and on plants in the field. Plans are underway to conduct small-scale pilot tests to further evaluate their efficacy under field conditions. The compatibility of fungi with non-target organisms and chemical pesticides are also planned for the future.
