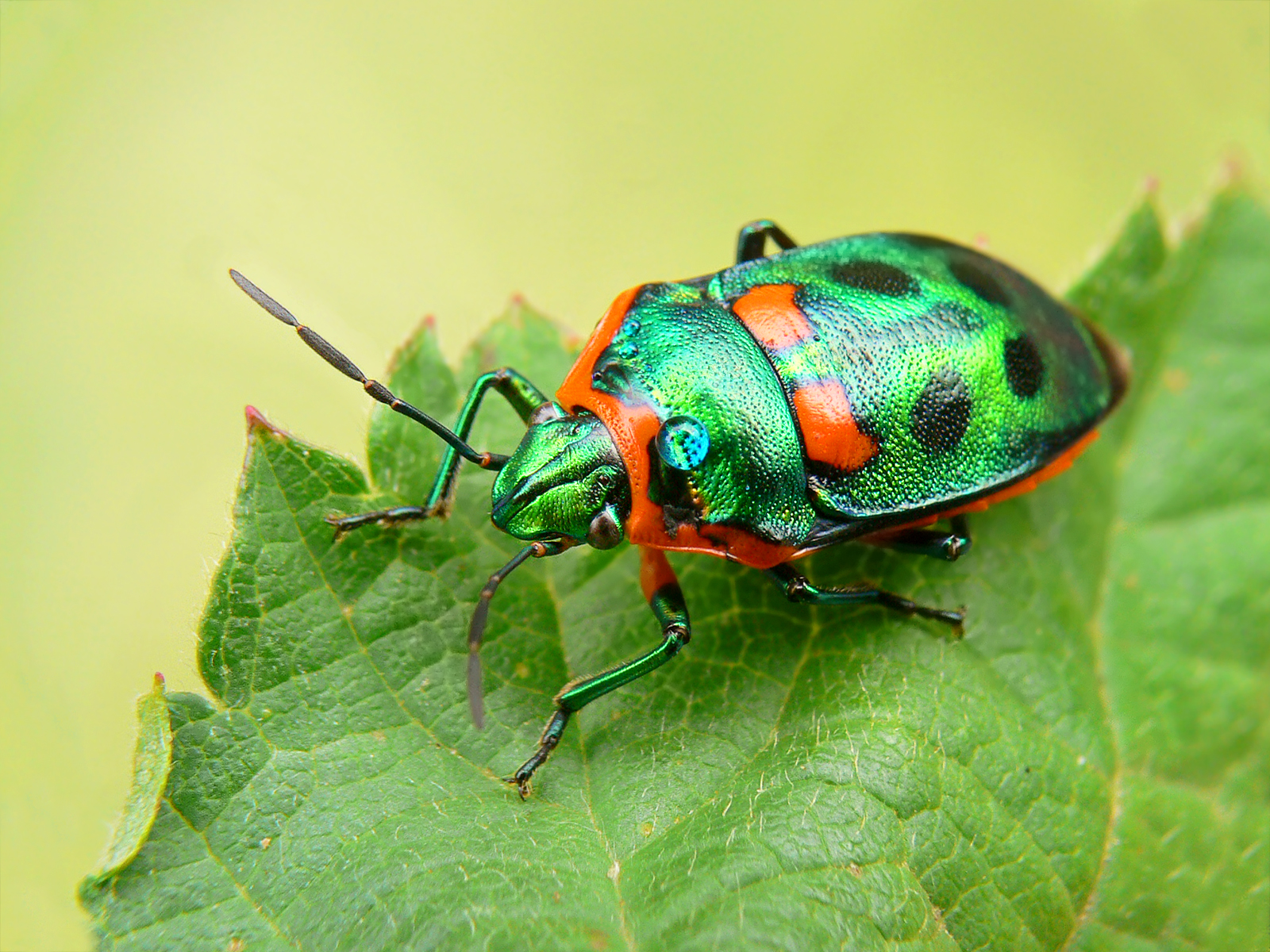
- Scutiphora pedicellata, a jewel bug from Australia

Scientific classification
- Kingdom: Animalia
- Phylum: Arthropoda
- Clade: Pancrustacea
- Class: Insecta
- Order: Hemiptera
- Suborder: Heteroptera
- Infraorder: Pentatomomorpha
- Superfamily: Pentatomoidea
- Family: Scutelleridae; Leach, 1815

Subfamilies
- Elvisurinae (Stål, 1872); Eurygastrinae Amyot & Audinet-Serville, 1843; Hoteinae Carapezza, 2008; Odontoscelinae Amyot & Audinet-Serville, 1843; Odontotarsinae (Mulsant and Rey, 1865); Pachycorinae Amyot & Audinet-Serville, 1843; Scutellerinae Leach, 1815; Tectocorinae McDonald & Cassis, 1984 (monotypic)

= Scutelleridae =

Jewel bugs

Family of insects

Scutelleridae is a family of true bugs. They are commonly known as jewel (stink) bugs or metallic shield bugs due to their often unique coloration. With the name based on the Asian genus Scutellera, they are also known as shield-backed bugs due to the enlargement of the thoracic scutellum into a continuous shield over the abdomen and wings. This latter characteristic distinguishes them from most other families within Heteroptera, and may lead to misidentification as a beetle rather than a bug. These insects use their piercing-sucking mouthparts to feed on plant juices from a variety of different species, including some commercial crops. Closely related to stink bugs, they may also produce an offensive odour when disturbed. There are around 450 species worldwide.

== Description ==
Jewel bugs are small to medium-sized, oval-shaped bugs with a body length averaging 5 to 20 mm (0.20 to 0.79 in). They can easily be distinguished from stink bugs (Pentatomidae) because the shield-like enlarged last section of their thorax (known as the scutellum, Latin for "little shield") completely covers the abdomen and the wings.

Despite their resemblance to beetles, jewel bugs are hemipterans, or true bugs. The scutellum extends the thorax, unlike the elytra of beetles, which are hardened forewings. As such, jewel bugs have four membranous wings underneath the scutellum in contrast to two in beetles. The scutellum in jewel bugs also does not have a division in the middle and thus does not 'split open' when they take flight like in beetles.

The heads of jewel bugs are triangular, and the antennae have three to five segments. Like all heteropterans, jewel bugs are characterized by a segmented beak-like mouthpart (known as the rostrum). During feeding, jewel bugs inject proteolytic enzymes in their saliva into plants, digesting plant matter into a liquid form which they then suck up. The tarsus has three segments (tarsomeres).

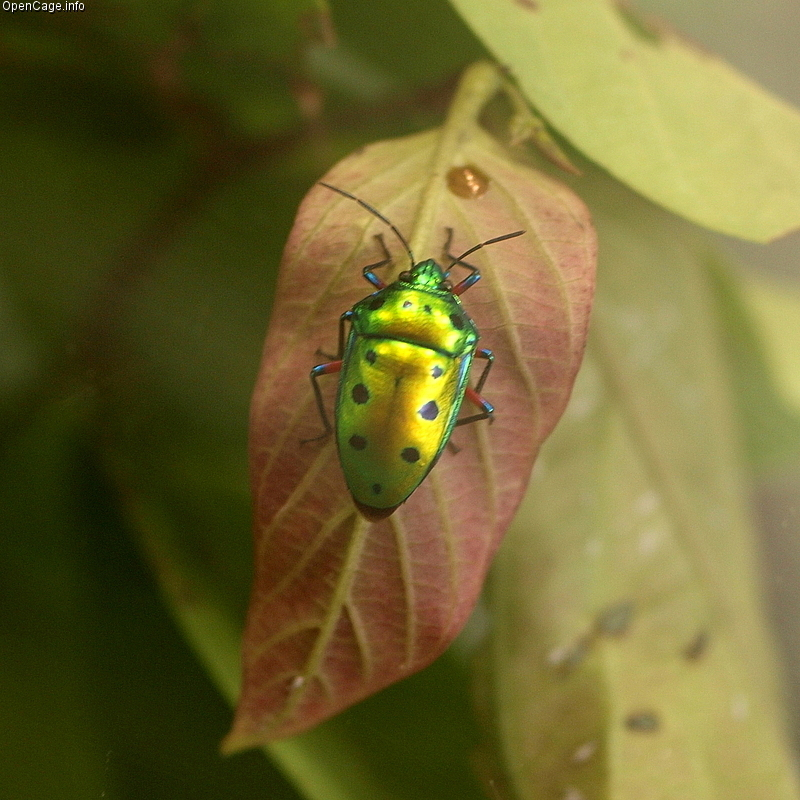
Calliphara excellens from Japan.

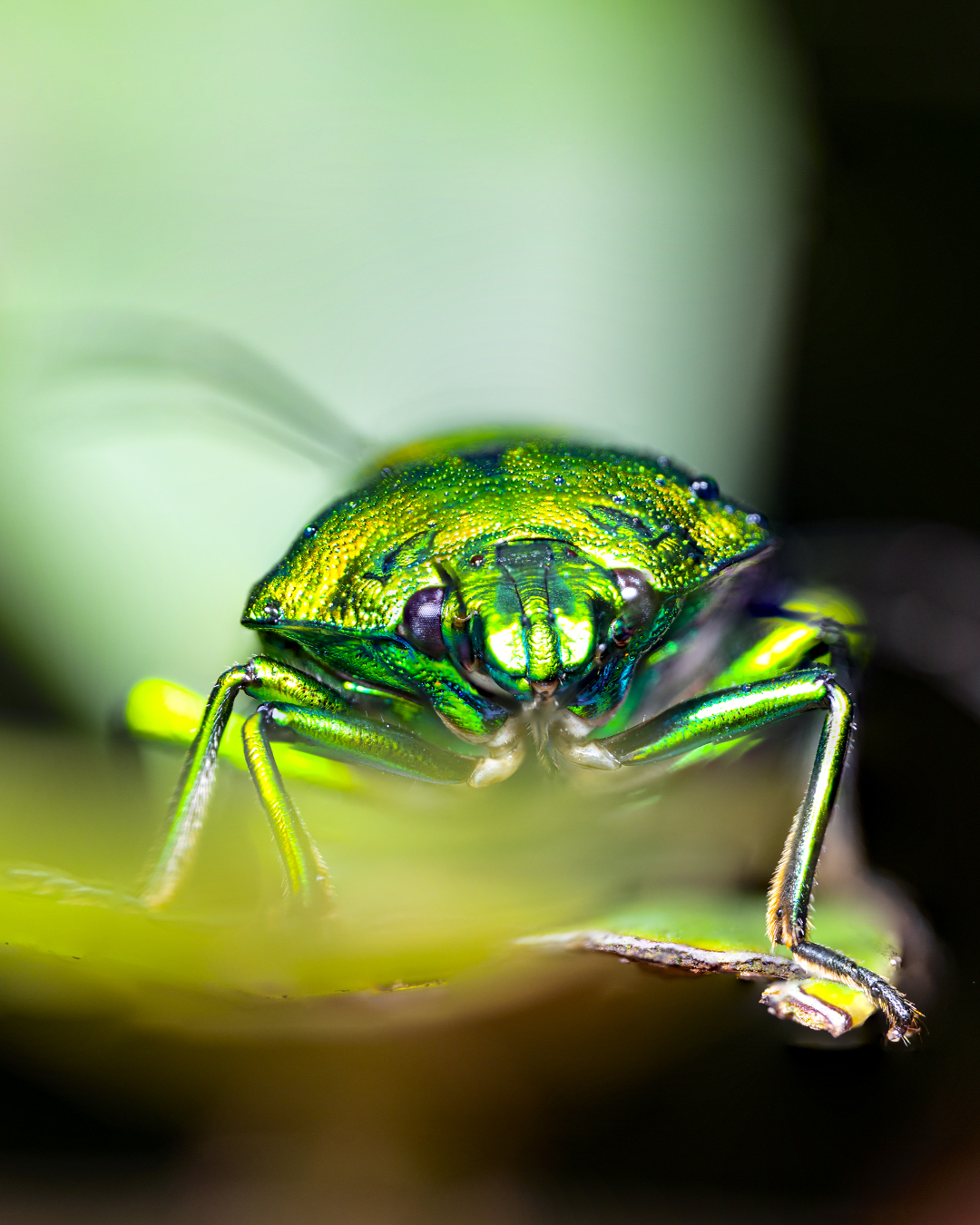
Jewel bug in Mumbai

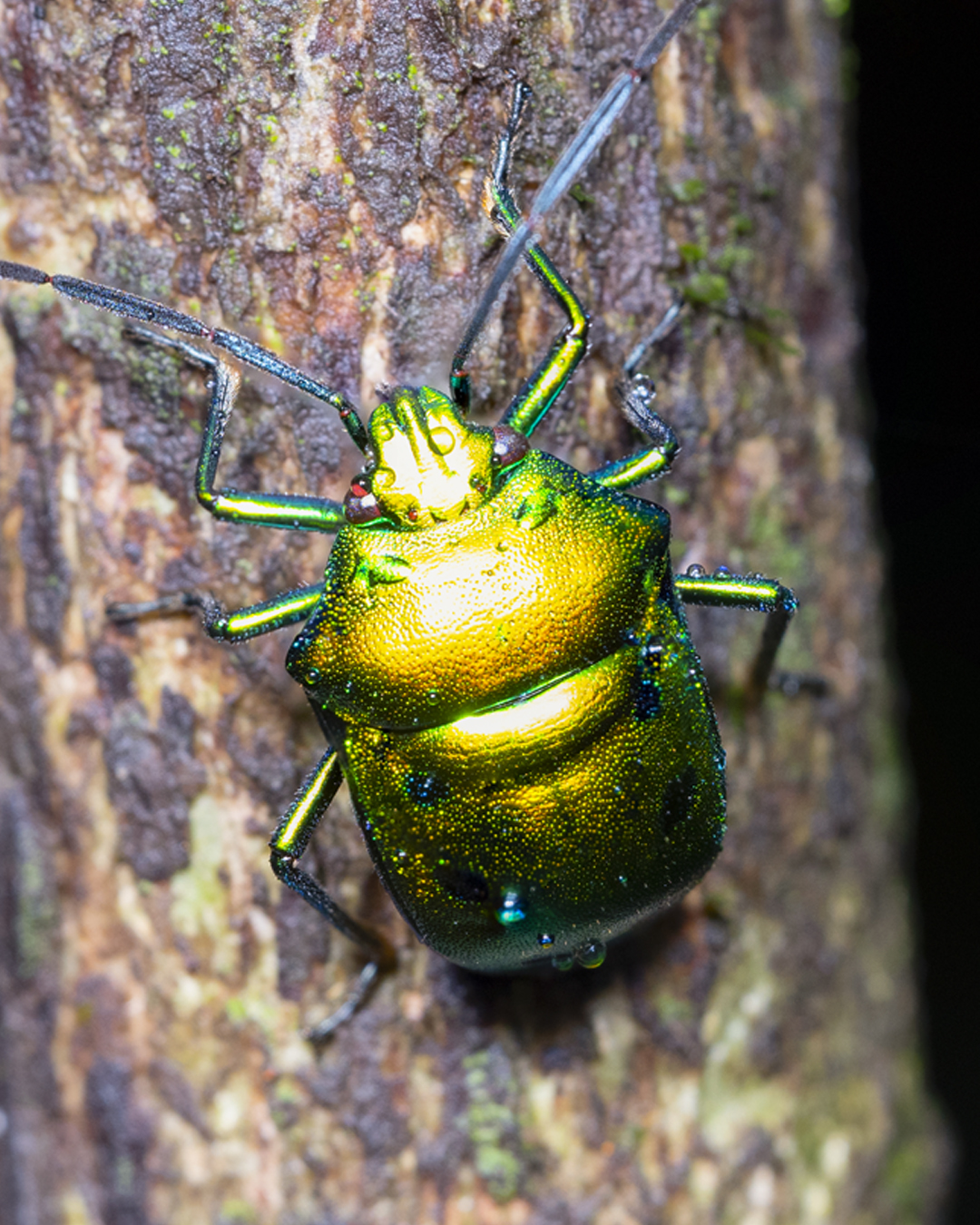
Jewel bug in Mumbai

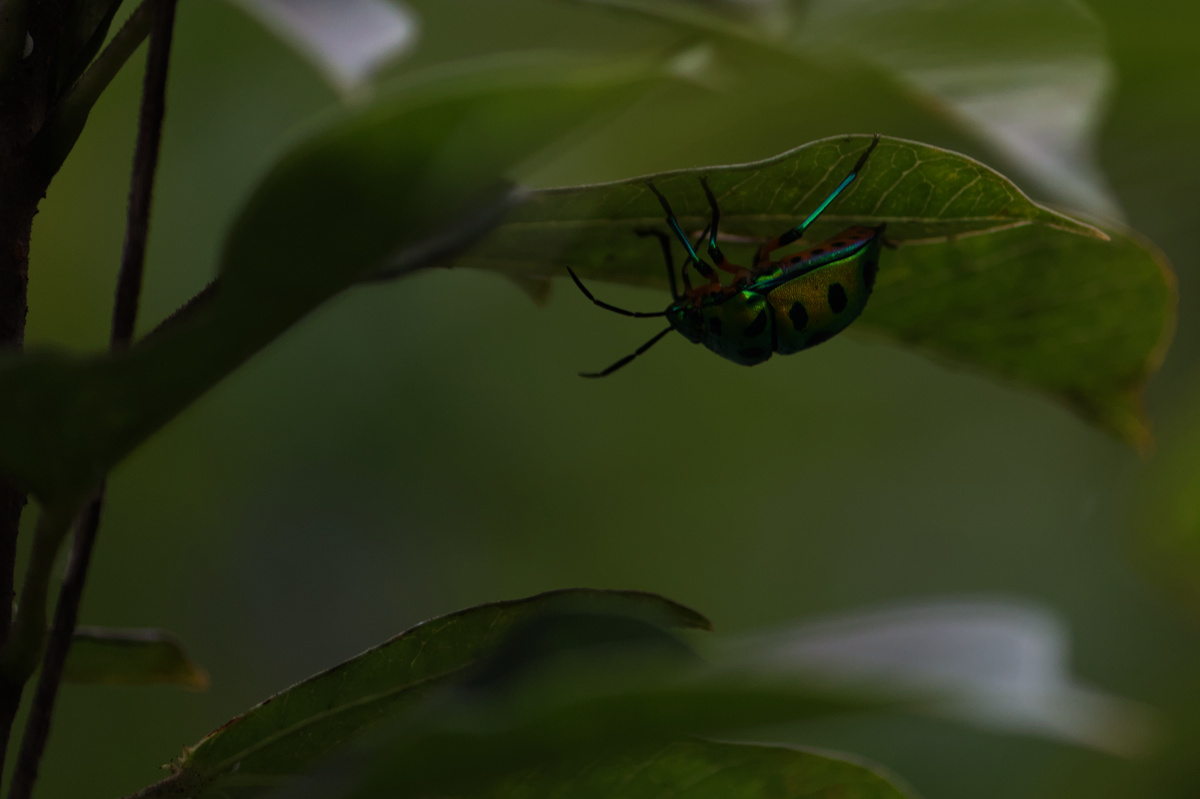
Jewel bug spotted tucked away in the canopy at Chennai

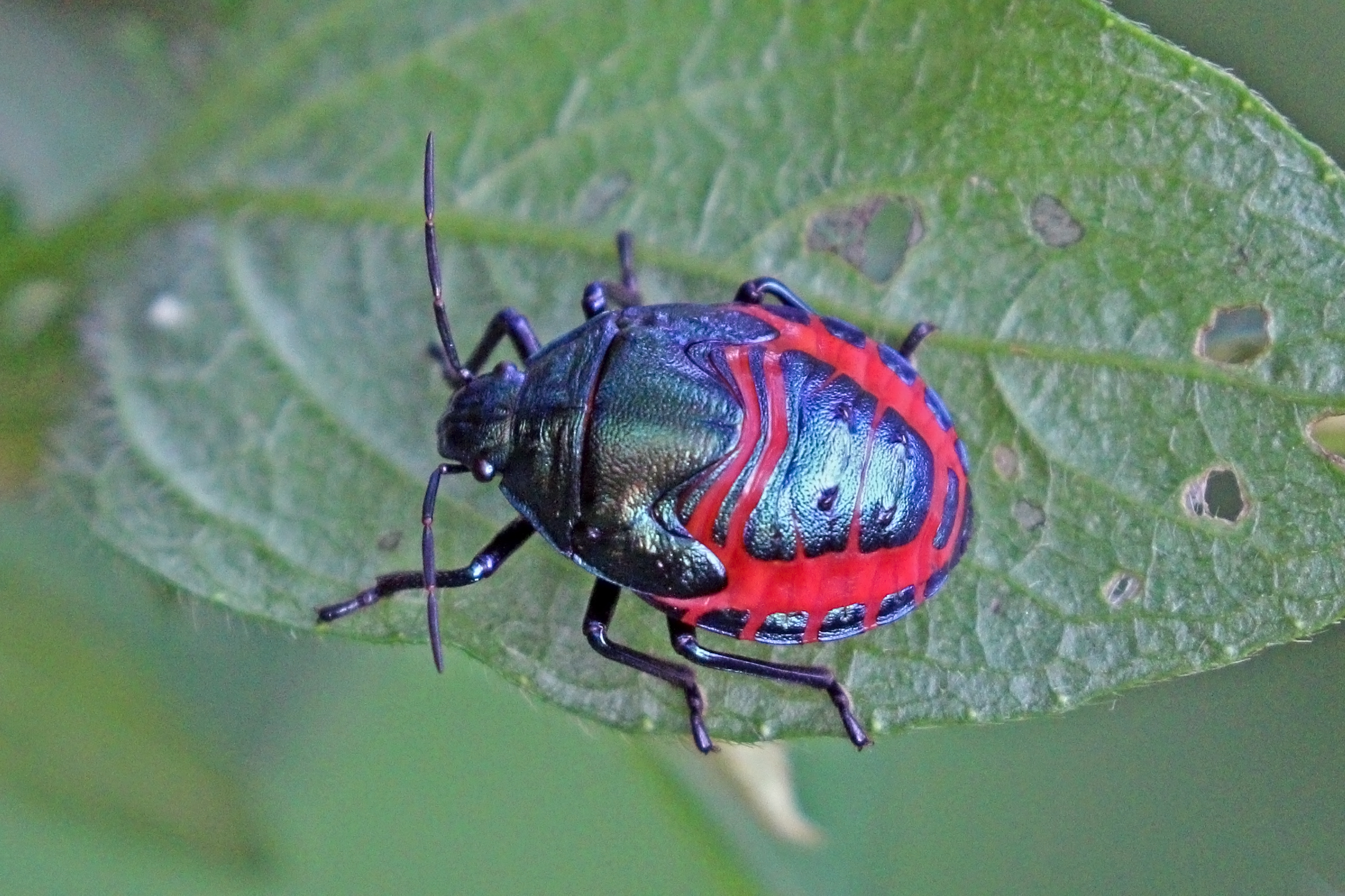
Shield-backed bug (Graptocoris aulicus) nymph, Uganda

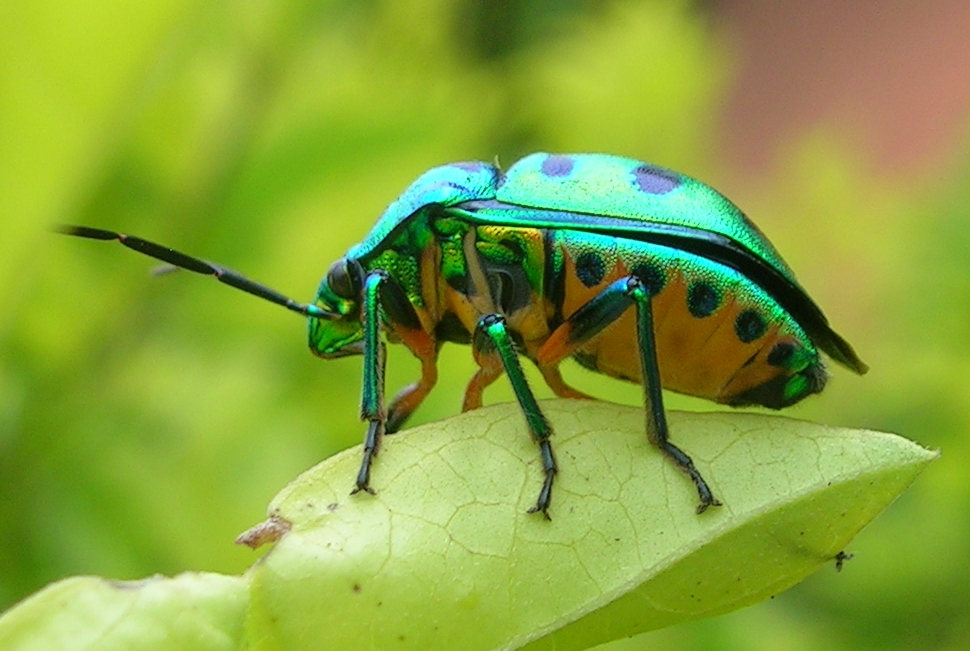
Chrysocoris sp., an iridescent green jewel bug from India.

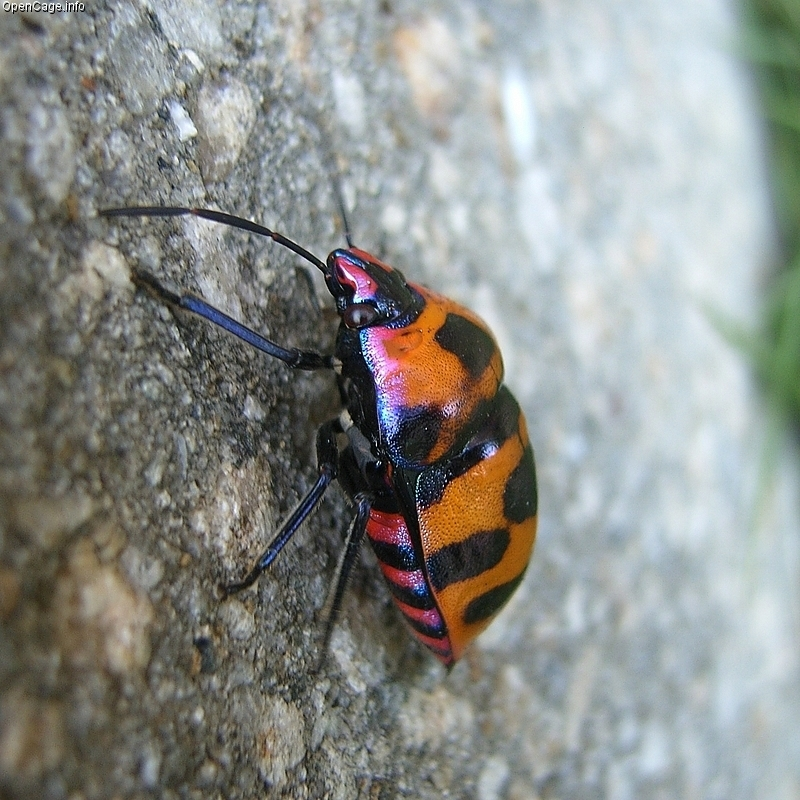
A brilliant orange, red, and black giant jewel stink bug Eucorysses grandis, from Japan. The pattern and coloration of this species can often vary from pale cream to deep red.

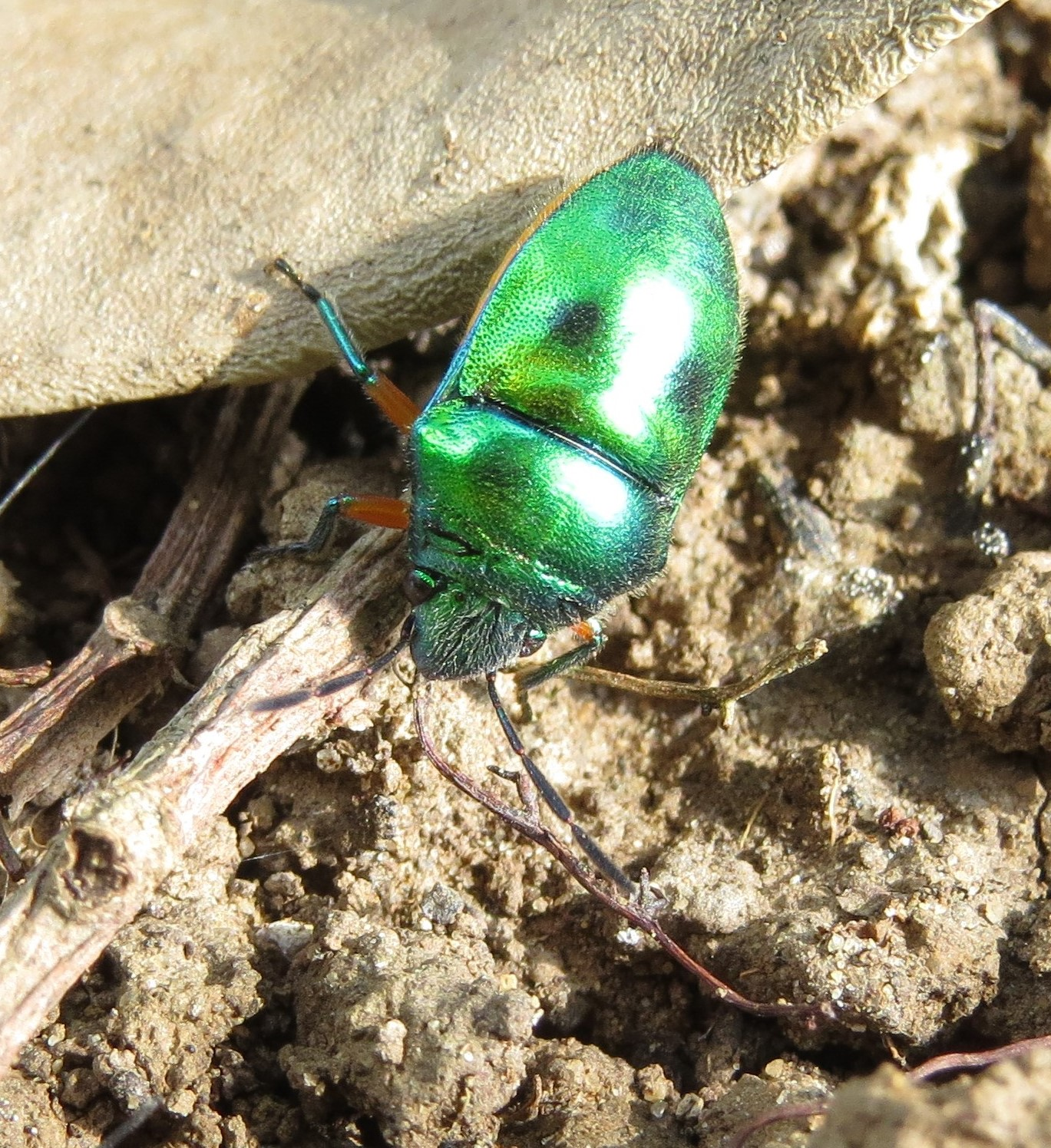
Lampromicra miyakona from Japan.

=== Colours ===
Though some species are quite drab, the most conspicuous jewel bugs are often uniquely colored, exhibiting a wide range of iridescent metallic hues that change with the viewing angle. The colors result from a combination of factors. Some species, like Chrysocoris stockerus and Scutellera nobilis, display colors from multiple thin layers of pigmented chitin. The colors often change or become duller when the specimens are dried, due to the topmost chitinous layer becoming opaque and obscuring the colors of the bottom layer. The colors can be restored by moistening the surface with water.

Iridescence (or goniochromism) in jewel bugs like Poecilocoris lewisi are the result of structural coloration. Instead of pigments, the colors are caused by the interference, diffraction, or scattering of light by many tiny structures.

In Poecilocoris lewisi, multiple tiny conical protuberances around 900 nm in height and averaging a diameter of 360 nm are scattered on the epicuticle. These structures affect light passing through them, producing their oily-looking blue sheen (known as the Tyndall effect or Mie scattering).

In other species, like the African shield bug (Calidea panaethiopica), the dorsal cuticle is dotted with tiny, regularly spaced hemispherical cavities. The depressions act like Bragg mirrors. When light hits the pitted surface, it gives off multiple reflections, resulting in the distinctive two-tone yellow-blue iridescence.

The colors and patterns on jewel bugs can vary significantly between instars and even within adults of a species.

Jewel bugs are also known to mimic the colors, patterns, and shapes of other organisms for defensive purposes. An example is the yellow-spotted black Steganocerus multipunctatus which exhibits Müllerian mimicry with the tortoise beetle Chiridopsis suffriani.

== Ecology and life cycle ==
All jewel bugs feed on plants (phytophagous). The eggs are laid in compact clusters. They may be round or barrel-shaped with a lid or a cap at the top (known as the operculum). They also contain a ring of small protuberances near the cap called micropylar processes. They permit the passage of sperm into the egg for fertilization and enable gaseous exchange from within the egg and the outside world for the embryo. The eggs are white or cream-colored when freshly laid but can change color as the embryo matures. When hatching, the prolarva (the advanced embryo) exits the egg by opening the lid through peristaltic movements and with the help of a T-shaped internal structure in the egg (known as the egg burster).

Like all hemipterans, jewel bugs undergo incomplete metamorphosis (hemimetaboly) and do not possess larval and pupal stages. Instead, the adults develop from several stages of nymphs through successive moltings. Nymphs resemble the adults except for size and the absence of wings. They can be of different coloration or patterns from adults.

Some species are known to exhibit parental care of eggs and nymphs. Notable examples of which are Cantao parentum, Pachycoris klugii, Pachycoris stalii, Pachycoris torridus, and Tectocoris diophthalmus.

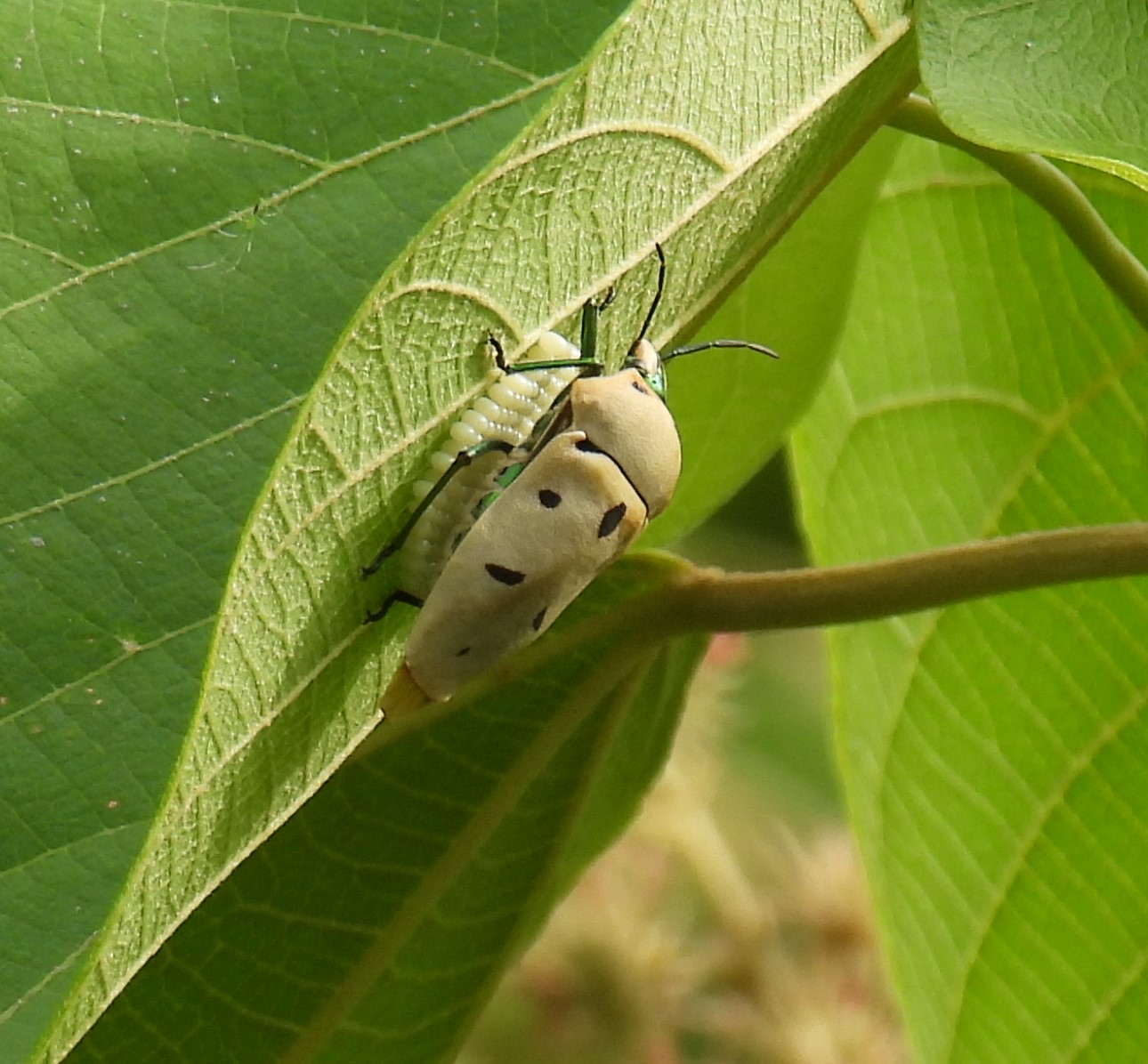
A female of Cantao ocellatus protecting a cluster of eggs.

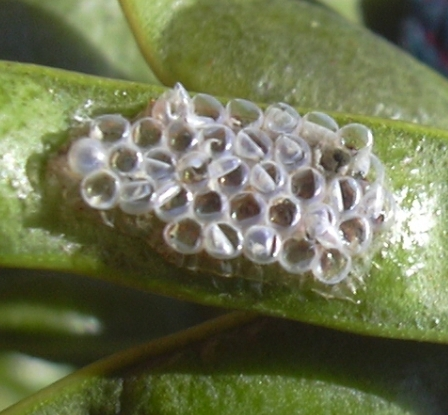
A cluster of the empty barrel-shaped eggs of the Koa bug (Coleotichus blackburniae) from Hawaii. The 'lids' can clearly be seen.

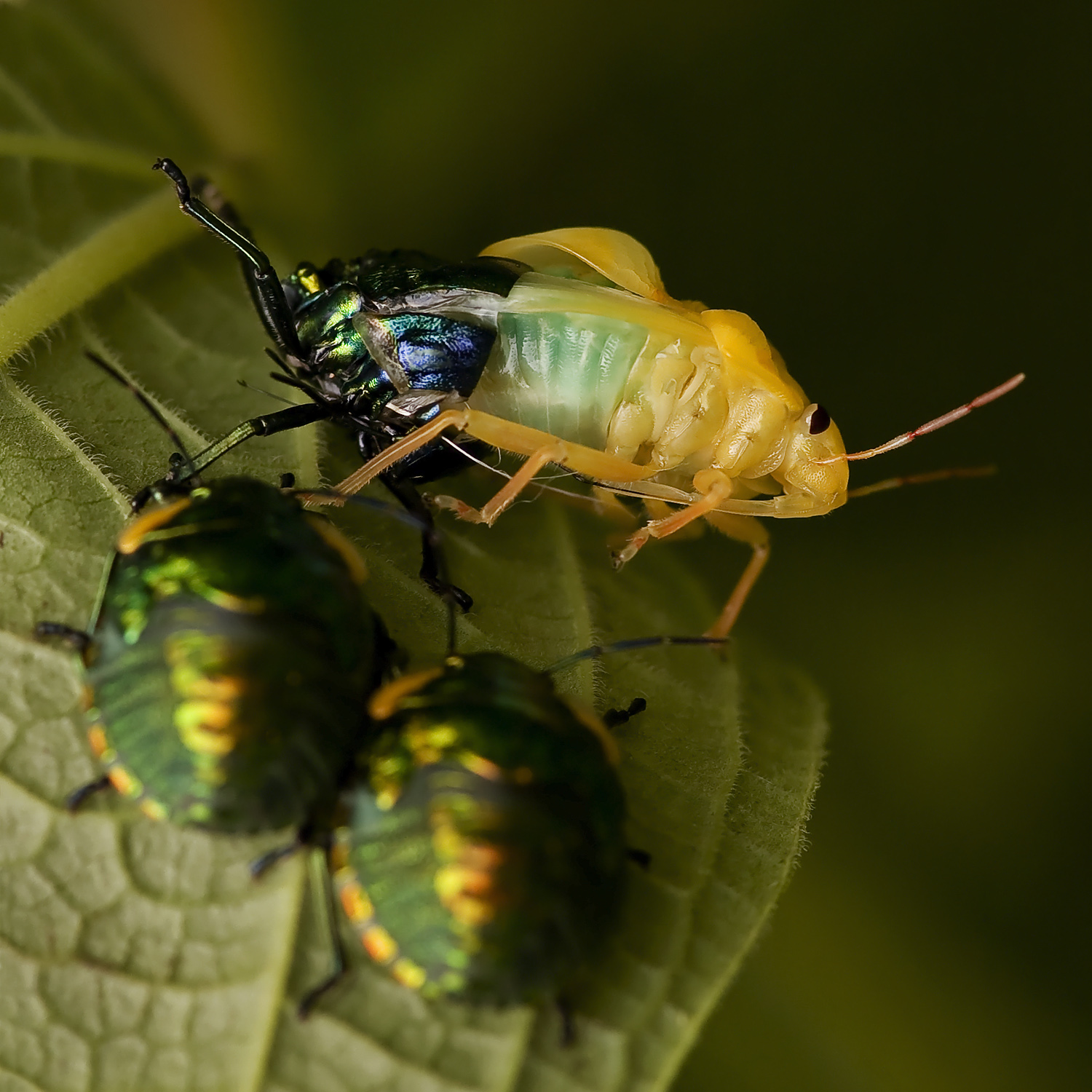
A jewel bug molting (ecdysis). The pale-colored adult is emerging from its old exoskeleton, in the foreground are two nymphs.

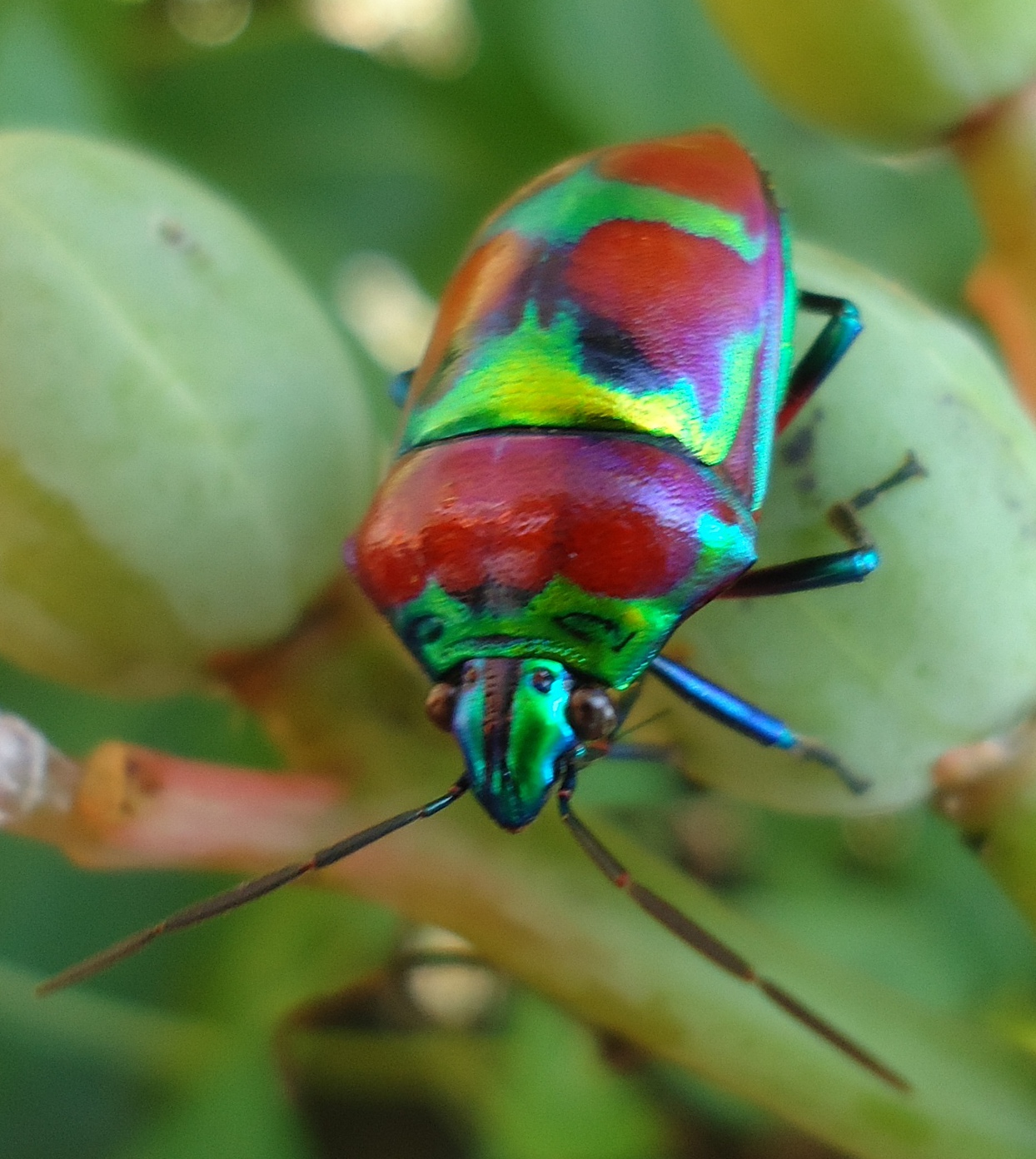
A jewel bug from the Philippines feeding on Jatropha.

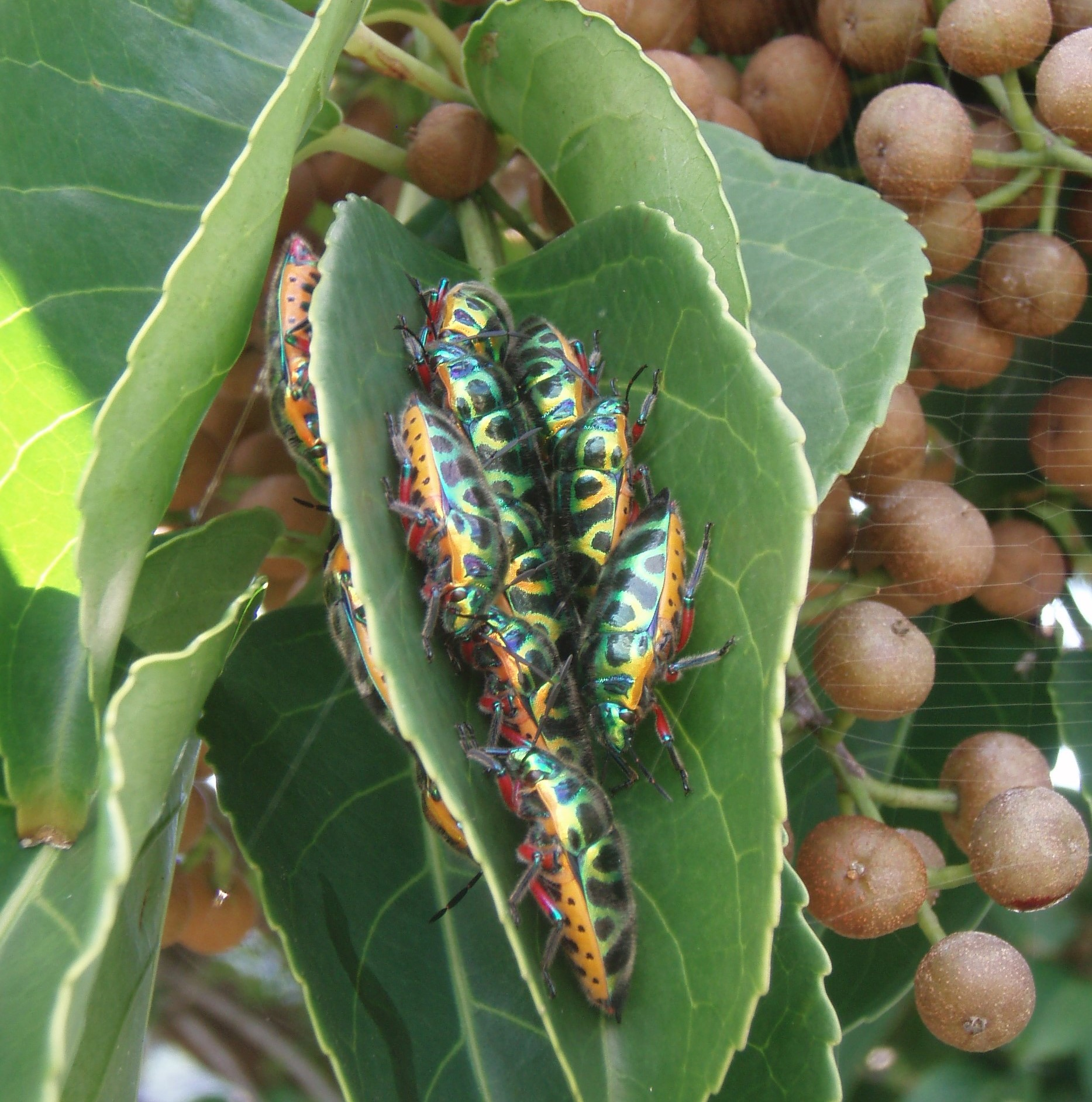
Scutellera amethystina, congregating on Bischofia javanica.

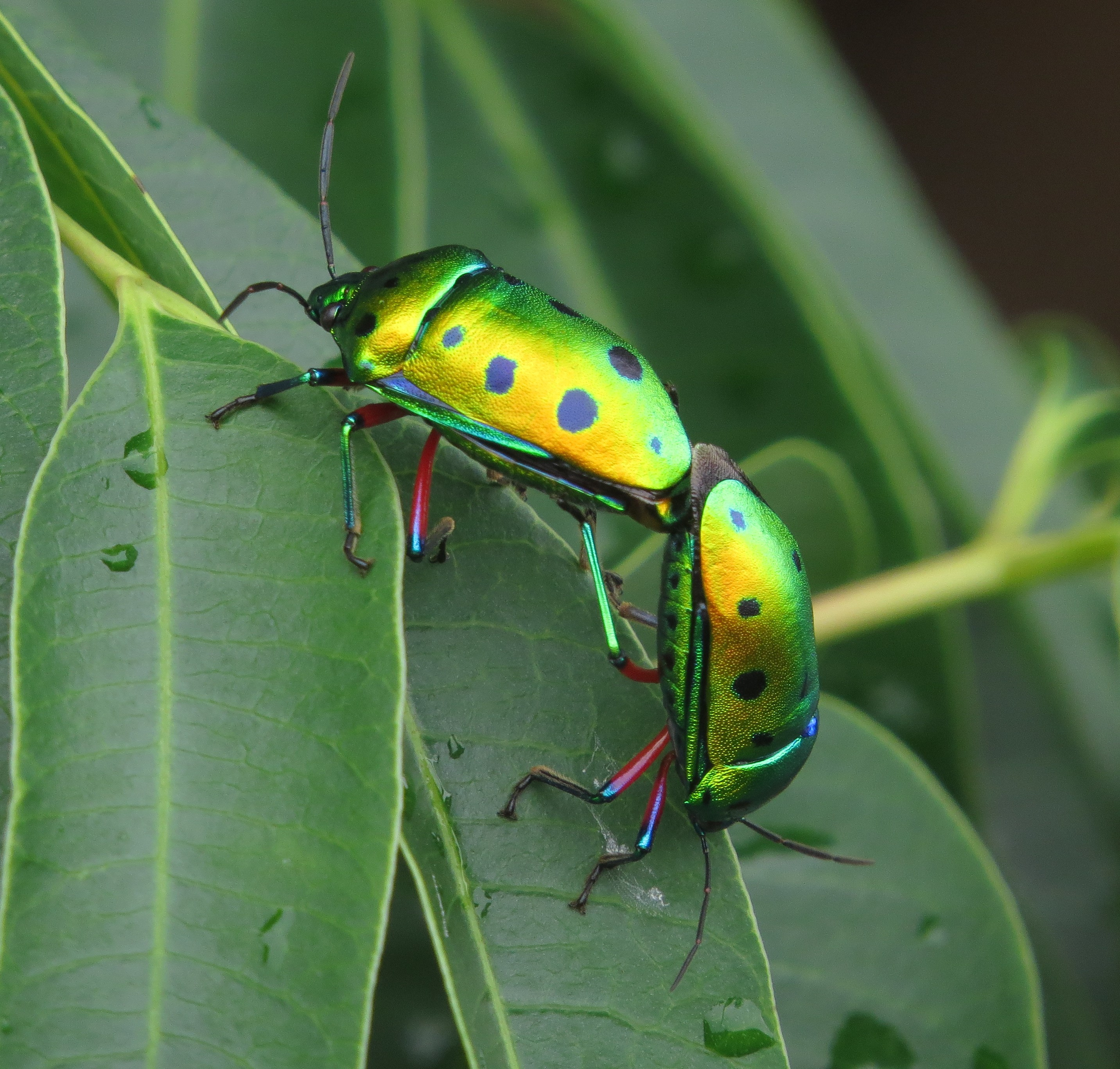
Calliphara excellens copulating.

=== Reproduction ===
Chemical secretions from dorsal, abdominal, or sternal exocrine glands are used to attract mates by certain species of jewel bugs. In certain genera (like Tectocoris, Psacasta, Odontoscelis, and Irochrotus), males possess special unicellular glands in the abdomen known as the androconia. They release sex pheromones when ruptured.

Females possess a spermatheca, an ectodermal gland that opens into the oviduct. These serve as storage for sperm deposited by the male. It contains glands which can nourish the spermatozoa until they can be released to fertilize eggs.

Male jewel bugs of the genus Hotea possess unusually large, spiky, and heavily sclerotized genitalia. They are used in a mating practice known as traumatic insemination, a result of evolutionary sexual conflict. Male Hotea bugs tear through the female reproductive ducts to deposit sperm, inflicting substantial damage to the female in the process.

=== Defenses ===
Like stink bugs, a vast majority of jewel bugs, both adults and nymphs, can release pungent defensive chemicals from glands on the sides of the thorax. Typical compounds exuded by jewel bugs include alcohols, aldehydes, and esters.

Nymphs and adults often exhibit clustering behavior, being found in large numbers close to each other. This behavior is thought to have an evolutionary advantage. The more individuals present in an area, the stronger the odor of the chemicals released when the bugs are threatened. If this fails, jewel bugs will react to threats by flying away or dropping to the ground.

== Classification and evolution ==
Scutellerids were first described by the English zoologist William Elford Leach in 1815. It belongs to the order Hemiptera (true bugs), under the suborder Heteroptera and infraorder Pentatomomorpha. They are classified under the superfamily Pentatomoidea. They were formerly classified as a subfamily of Pentatomidae by George Willis Kirkaldy in 1909. The earliest attempt to restore them to family status was in 1917 by Edward Payson Van Duzee. Most authorities today regard it as a valid family group. In phylogenetic studies in 2008 by Grazia et al., Scutelleridae was shown to be consistently monophyletic, basal to Acanthosomatidae, and distal to Plataspididae and Parastrachiidae. Below is the morphological unweighted tree of the superfamily Pentatomoidea after Grazia et al. (2008).

- ←
  - Urostylididae
  - - Saileriolidae
    - - Acanthosomatidae
      - - - Tessaratomidae
          - Dinidoridae
          - Cydnidaesensu lato
            - Cydnidae
            - Thaumastellidae
            - Parastrachiinae
          - - Thyreocoridae
            - Lestoniidae
            - Phloeidae
            - - Scutelleridae
              - Plataspididae
            - Pentatomidae
            - Canopidae
            - Megarididae

== Subfamilies and genera ==
The family comprises about 81 genera and around 450 species worldwide. While the tribal and subfamilial classifications remain unclear, they are divided into eight subfamilies sensu lato: Elvisurinae, Eurygastrinae, Hoteinae (sometimes classified under Pachycorinae), Odontoscelinae, Odontotarsinae, Pachycorinae, Scutellerinae, and Tectocorinae.

=== Elvisurinae ===
Auth.: Stål, 1872. Widespread distribution, with the type genus Elvisura found in southern Africa; only one species of Elvisurinae, Solenosthedium bilunatum, is found in Europe.

1. Austrotichus Gross, 1975 - monotypic A. rugosus Gross, 1975
2. Coleotichus White, 1839
3. Elvisura Spinola, 1837
4. Solenosthedium Spinola, 1837
5. Solenotichus Martin, 1897

=== Eurygastrinae ===
Auth.: Amyot & Audinet-Serville, 1843

Tribe Eurygastrini Amyot & Audinet-Serville, 1843

1. Eurygaster Laporte, 1833
2. Polyphyma Jakovlev, 1877

Tribe Psacastini Mulsant & Rey, 1865

1. Ceratocranum Reuter, 1890
2. Periphima Jakovlev, 1889
3. Periphymopsis Schouteden, 1904
4. Promecocoris Puton, 1886
5. Psacasta Germar, 1839
6. Xerobia Stål, 1873

=== Hoteinae ===
Auth.: Carapezza, 2008

1. Deroplax Mayr, 1864
2. Ellipsocoris Mayr, 1864
3. Hotea Amyot & Serville, 1843

=== Odontoscelinae ===
Auth.: Amyot & Audinet-Serville, 1843; mostly European

1. Holonotellus Horváth, 1895
2. Irochrotus Amyot & Serville, 1843
3. Odontoscelis Laporte, 1833

=== Odontotarsinae ===
Auth.: Mulsant & Rey, 1865

Tribe Odontotarsini Mulsant & Rey, 1865

1. Ahmadocoris Carapezza, 2009
2. Alphocoris Germar, 1839
3. Melanodema Jakovlev, 1880
4. Odontotarsiellus Hoberlandt, 1955
5. Odontotarsus Laporte, 1833
6. Urothyreus Horváth, 1921

Tribe Phimoderini Fuente, 1974

1. Euptychodera Bergroth, 1908
2. Fokkeria Schouteden, 1904
3. Morbora Distant, 1899
4. Phimodera Germar, 1839
5. Vanduzeeina Schouteden, 1904

=== Pachycorinae ===
Auth.: Amyot & Audinet-Serville, 1843

1. Acantholomidea Sailer, 1945
2. Agonosoma Laporte, 1833
3. Ascanius (bug) Stål, 1868
4. Brailovskylus Eger, 2017
5. Camirus Stål, 1862
6. Chelycoris Bergroth, 1891
7. Chelyschema Bergroth, 1891
8. Coptochilus Amyot & Serville, 1843
9. Crathis (bug) Stål, 1861
10. Diolcus Mayr, 1864
11. Dystus Stål, 1862
12. Ephynes Stål, 1868
13. Galeacius Distant, 1889
14. Homaemus Dallas, 1851
15. Lobothyreus Mayr, 1864
16. Misippus Stål, 1868
17. Nesogenes Horváth, 1921
18. Orsilochides Kirkaldy, 1909
19. Pachycoris Burmeister, 1835
20. Polytes Stål, 1868
21. Sphyrocoris Mayr, 1864
22. Stethaulax Bergroth, 1891
23. Symphylus Dallas, 1851
24. Testrina Walker, 1867
25. Tetyra Fabricius, 1803
26. Tiridates (bug) Stål, 1868

=== Scutellerinae ===
Auth.: Leach, 1815. Selected genera:

- Augocoris
- Calliphara
- Cantao
- Chrysocoris
- Eucorysses Amyot & Audinet-Serville, 1843
- Lampromicra
- Scutellera Lamarck, 1801
- Sphaerocoris

Tectocorinae McDonald & Cassis, 1984 (monotypic)

- Tectocoris Hahn, 1834

== Economic significance ==
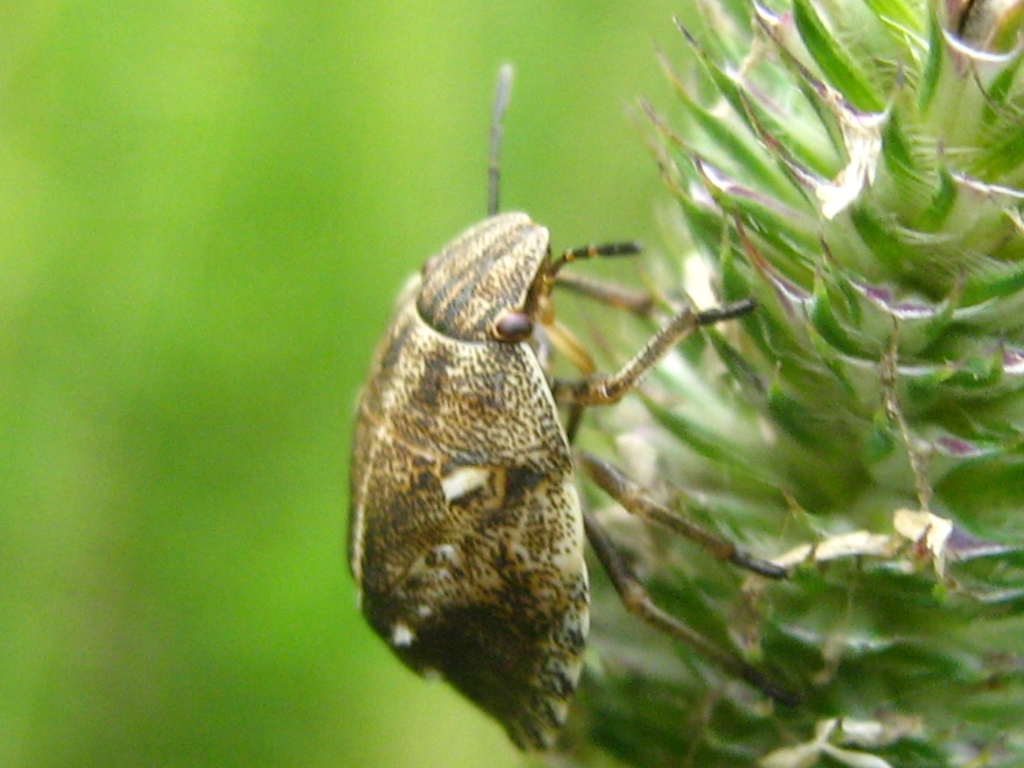
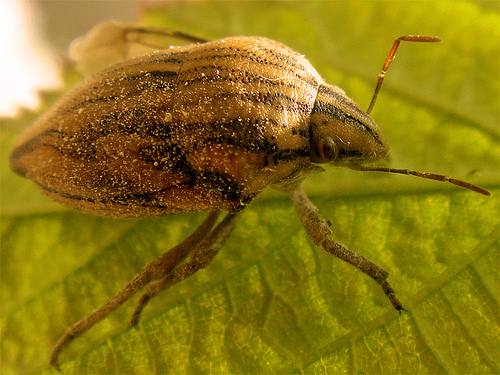
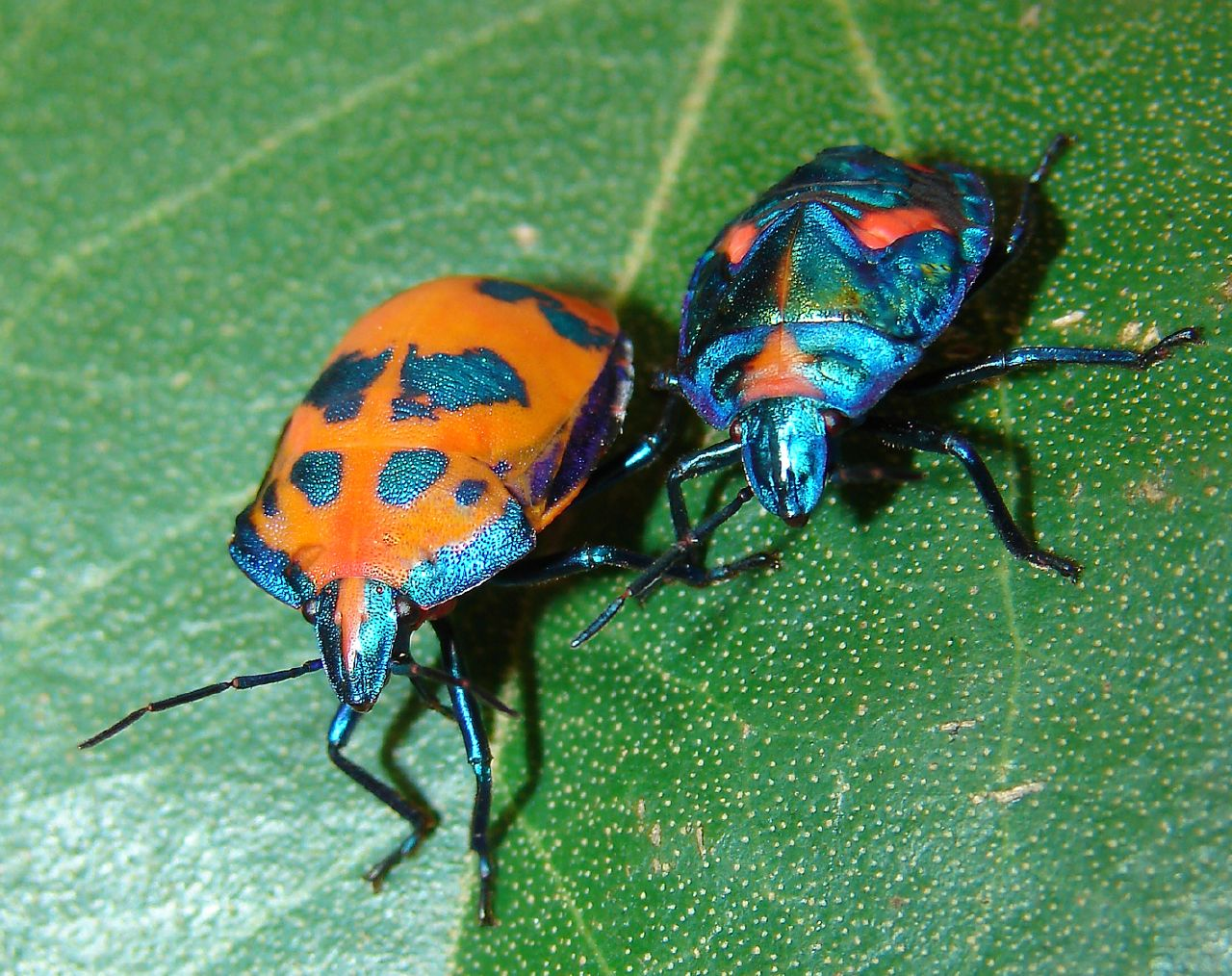
Left: Eurygaster testudinaria, a sunn pest from Germany. Center: Odontotarsus grammicus, another sunn pest from Spain. Right: An adult and nymph cotton harlequin bug (Tectocoris diophthalmus).

Though most jewel bugs do little harm to crop plants, a few members of Scutelleridae are considered major agricultural pests. Some of the most economically impactful species are members of the genus Eurygaster. Together with some species of stink bugs, they are collectively known as sunn pests or wheat bugs.

Eurygaster integriceps, in particular, is a very destructive pest of cereal crops in North Africa, the Balkans, and western and central Asia. Other scutellerids known under the name 'sunn pest' include members of the genus Odontotarsus, among others. Methods of control for sunn pests have included biological pest control, using wasps of the family Scelionidae from the genera Trissolcus and Ooencyrtus.

The cotton harlequin bug (Tectocoris diophthalmus) is also an important pest of cotton crops and Hibiscus.

== Conservation ==
Biological methods of pest control have sometimes backfired. A parasitoid fly which preys on hemipterans, Trichopoda pennipes, was introduced to Hawaii to control the invasive species Nezara viridula, the southern green stink bug. The fly now threatens native species of bugs in Hawaii as well, particularly the Koa bug (Coleotichus blackburniae, a jewel bug species notable for not possessing stink glands) which has now become rare.

== Gallery ==
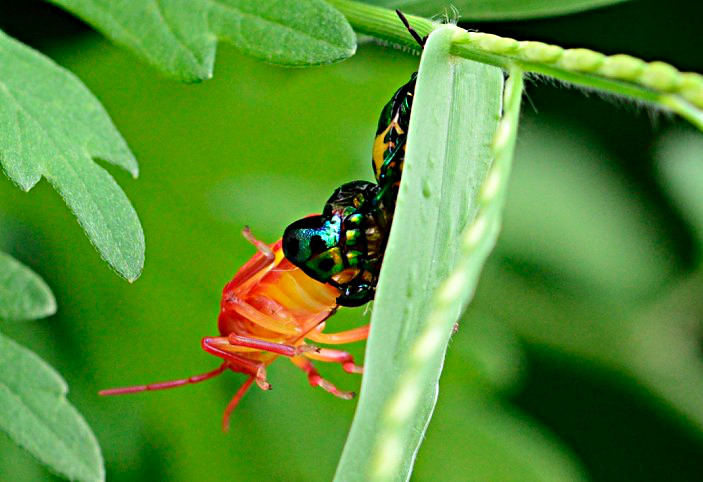
Molting (moulting) jewel bug (1)

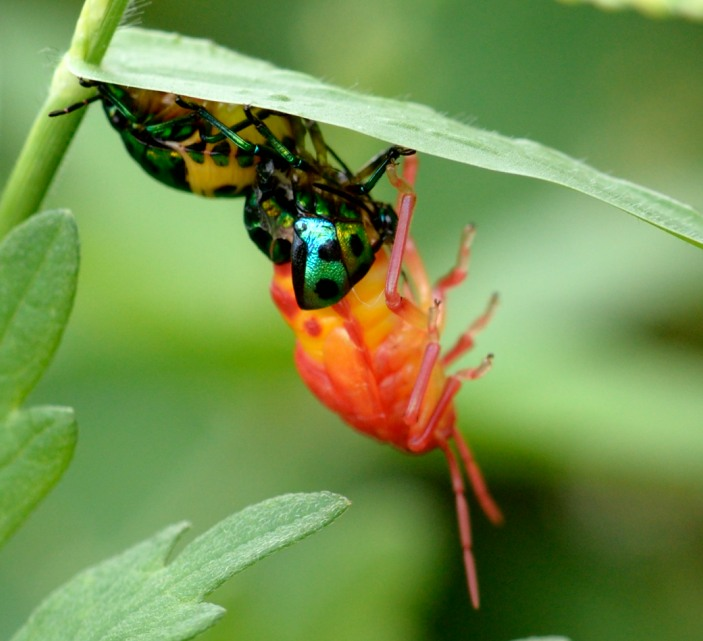
Molting (moulting) jewel bug (2)

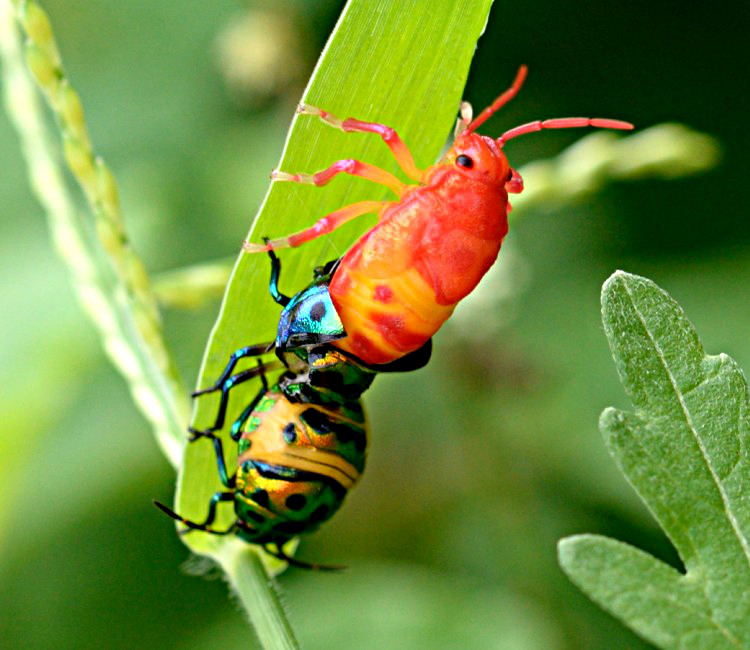
Molting (moulting) jewel bug (3)

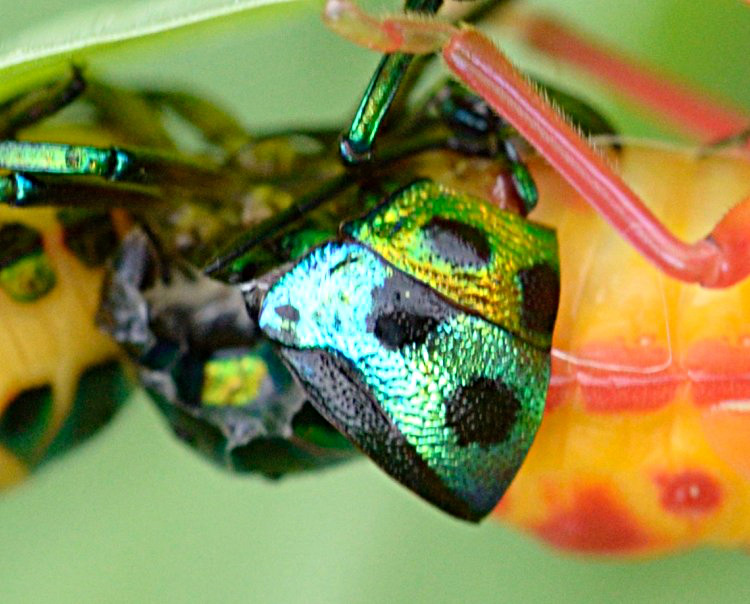
Molting (moulting) jewel bug (4)

== See also ==
- Sunn pest
