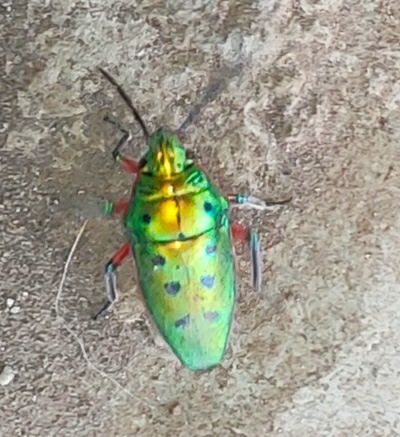
- Scutellera perplexa

Scientific classification
- Kingdom: Animalia
- Phylum: Arthropoda
- Clade: Pancrustacea
- Class: Insecta
- Order: Hemiptera
- Suborder: Heteroptera
- Family: Scutelleridae
- Subfamily: Scutellerinae; Leach, 1815

= Scutellerinae =

Subfamily of true bugs

Scutellerinae is a subfamily of shield-backed bugs erected by William Elford Leach in 1815.

== Tribes and genera ==
BioLib lists the following genera in two tribes:

=== Scutellerini ===
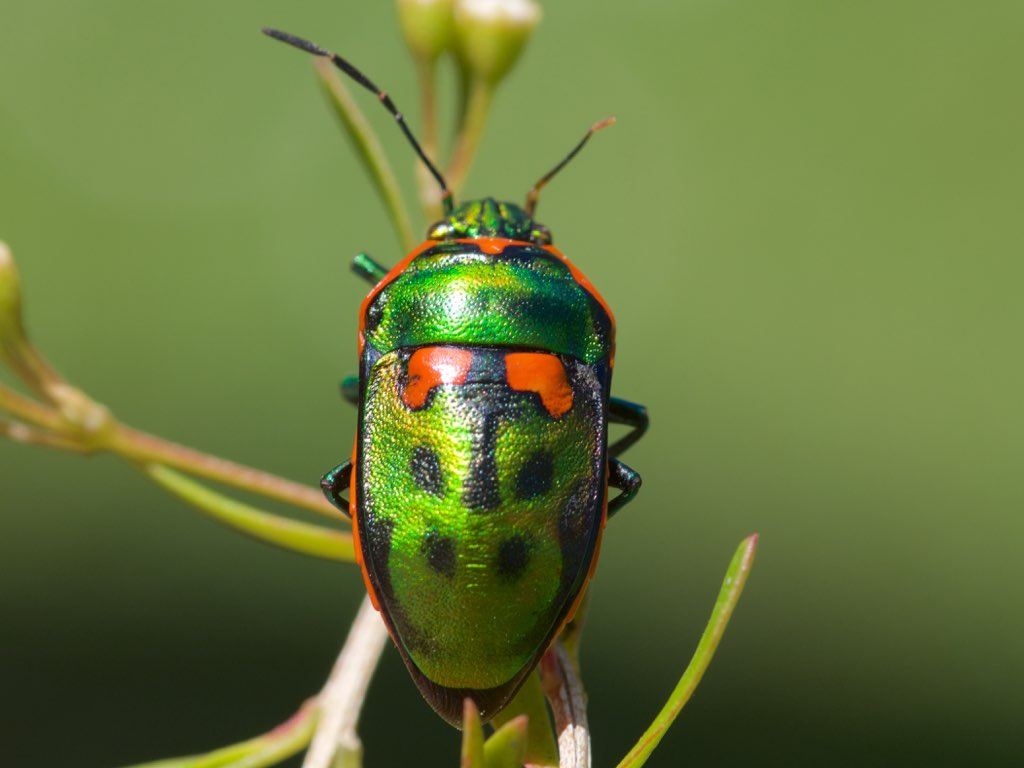
Scutiphora pedicellata

Auth. Leach, 1815

1. Anoplogonius Stål, 1873
2. Augocoris Burmeister, 1835
3. Bathistaulax Bergroth, 1912
4. Brachyaulax Stål, 1871
5. Calidea Laporte de Castelnau, 1832
6. Calliphara Germar, 1839
7. Cantao Amyot & Audinet-Serville, 1843
8. Choerocoris Dallas, 1851
9. Chrysocoris Hahn, 1834
10. Cosmocoris Stål, 1865
11. Cryptacrus Mayr, 1864
12. Eucorysses Amyot & Audinet-Serville, 1843
13. Fitha Walker, 1867
14. Gonaulax Schouteden, 1903
15. Graptocoris Stål, 1865
16. Graptophara Stål, 1865
17. Heissiphara Cassis & Vanags, 2006
18. Lamprocoris Stål, 1864
19. Lampromicra Stål, 1873
20. Nissania Lehmann, 1922
21. Notacalliphara Lyal, 1979
22. Paracalliphara Lyal, 1979
23. Poecilocoris Dallas, 1848
24. Procilia Stål, 1865
25. Scutellera Lamarck, 1801
26. Scutiphora Guérin-Méneville, 1831
27. Tetrarthria Dallas, 1851

=== Sphaerocorini ===
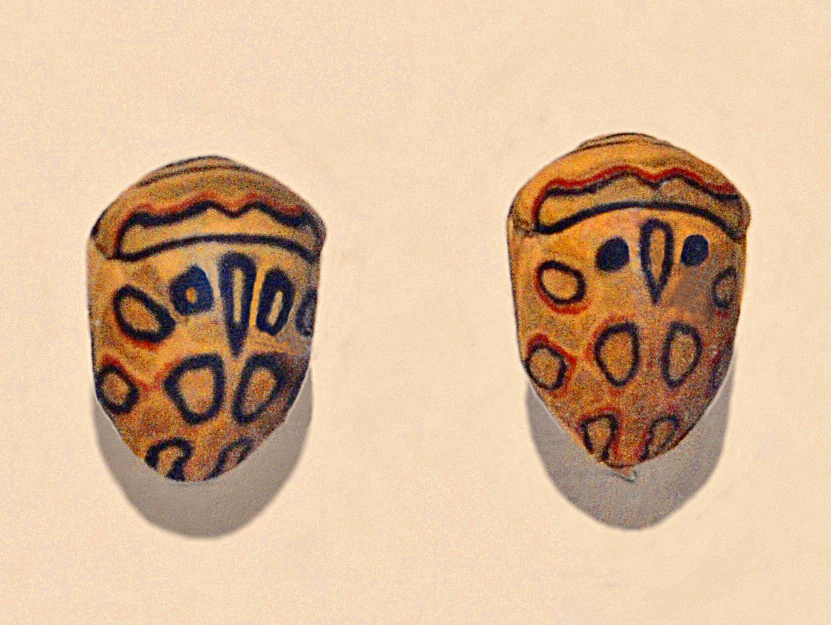
Sphaerocoris annulus

Auth. Stål, 1873

1. Chiastosternum Karsch, 1895
2. Hyperoncus Stål, 1871
3. Sphaerocoris Burmeister, 1835
4. Steganocerus Mayr, 1864
