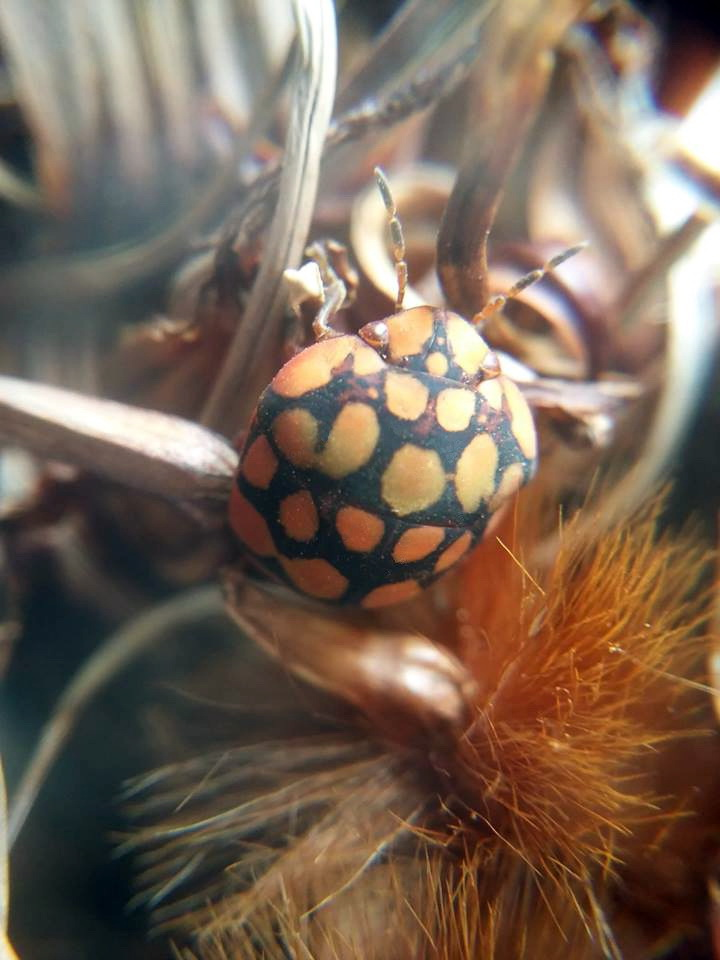

Scientific classification
- Kingdom: Animalia
- Phylum: Arthropoda
- Clade: Pancrustacea
- Class: Insecta
- Order: Hemiptera
- Suborder: Heteroptera
- Family: Scutelleridae
- Subfamily: Scutellerinae
- Genus: Steganocerus; Mayr, 1864
- Species: S. multipunctatus

Binomial name
- Steganocerus multipunctatus Thunberg, 1783

Synonyms
- Cimex argus Fabricius 1787; Cimex rusticus Fabricius 1787; Cimex multipunctatus Thunberg 1788; Sphaerocoris adspersus Stål 1853; Sphaerocoris hamiferus Stål 1853; Sphaerocoris impluviatus Germar 1839; Sphaerocoris quadrinotata Westwood 1837; Sphaerocoris simplex Herrich-Schäffer 1836; Sphaerocoris simulans Stål 1858; Steganocerus machadoi Leston 1954

= Steganocerus =

Species of true bug

Steganocerus multipunctatus, the ladybird bug, is a Sub-Saharan African member of the Hemiptera with a strong resemblance to a ladybird. It is the only species in the genus Steganocerus. It is normally black with bright orange spots, but is quite variable in colour and may be brown without spots. It shares Müllerian mimicry with the Tortoise beetle Chiridopsis suffriani, and a spider Paraplectana thorntoni.

Steganocerus multipunctatus is one of the Rhynchota whose presence has been recorded on a wide range of indigenous plants and cultivated crops such as cotton.
