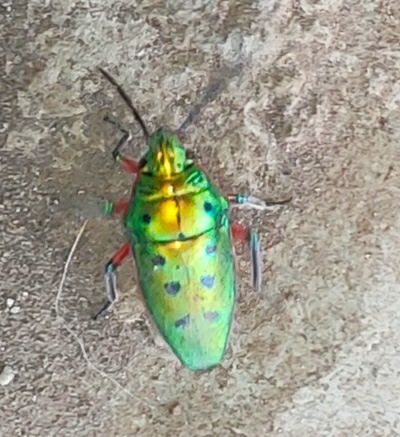
- Scutellera perplexa

Scientific classification
- Domain: Eukaryota
- Kingdom: Animalia
- Phylum: Arthropoda
- Class: Insecta
- Order: Hemiptera
- Suborder: Heteroptera
- Family: Scutelleridae
- Tribe: Scutellerini
- Genus: Scutellera; Lamarck, 1801

= Scutellera =

Genus of true bugs

Scutellera is the type genus of shield bugs in the subfamily Scutellerinae and tribe Scutellerini. Species are recorded from South and SE Asia.

== Species ==
The following names have been included, but the genus was revised in 2022:

1. Scutellera nepalensis (Westwood, 1837) - 2 subspecies:
  1. S. nepalensis nepalensis
  2. S. nepalensis amethystina (Germar, 1839)
2. Scutellera perplexa (Westwood, 1837) – type species (synonym Tectocoris perplexa (Westwood, 1837))
3. Scutellera spilogastra (Walker, 1867)

Now revised

- Scutellera fasciata (Panzer, 1797)
- previously as synonyms of "S. perplexa":
  - Scutellera brevirostris (Breddin, 1909)
  - Cimex nobilis (Fabricius, 1775) nec Linnaeus, 1763, Scutellera nobilis (Fabricius, 1775) are now Calliphara nobilis (Linnaeus, 1763)
- Scutellera holosericea Dohrn, 1863 is Procilia holosericea (Dohrn, 1863)
- Scutellera punctatissima Palisot de Beauvois, 1805
- Scutellera splendida Montrouzier, 1855
