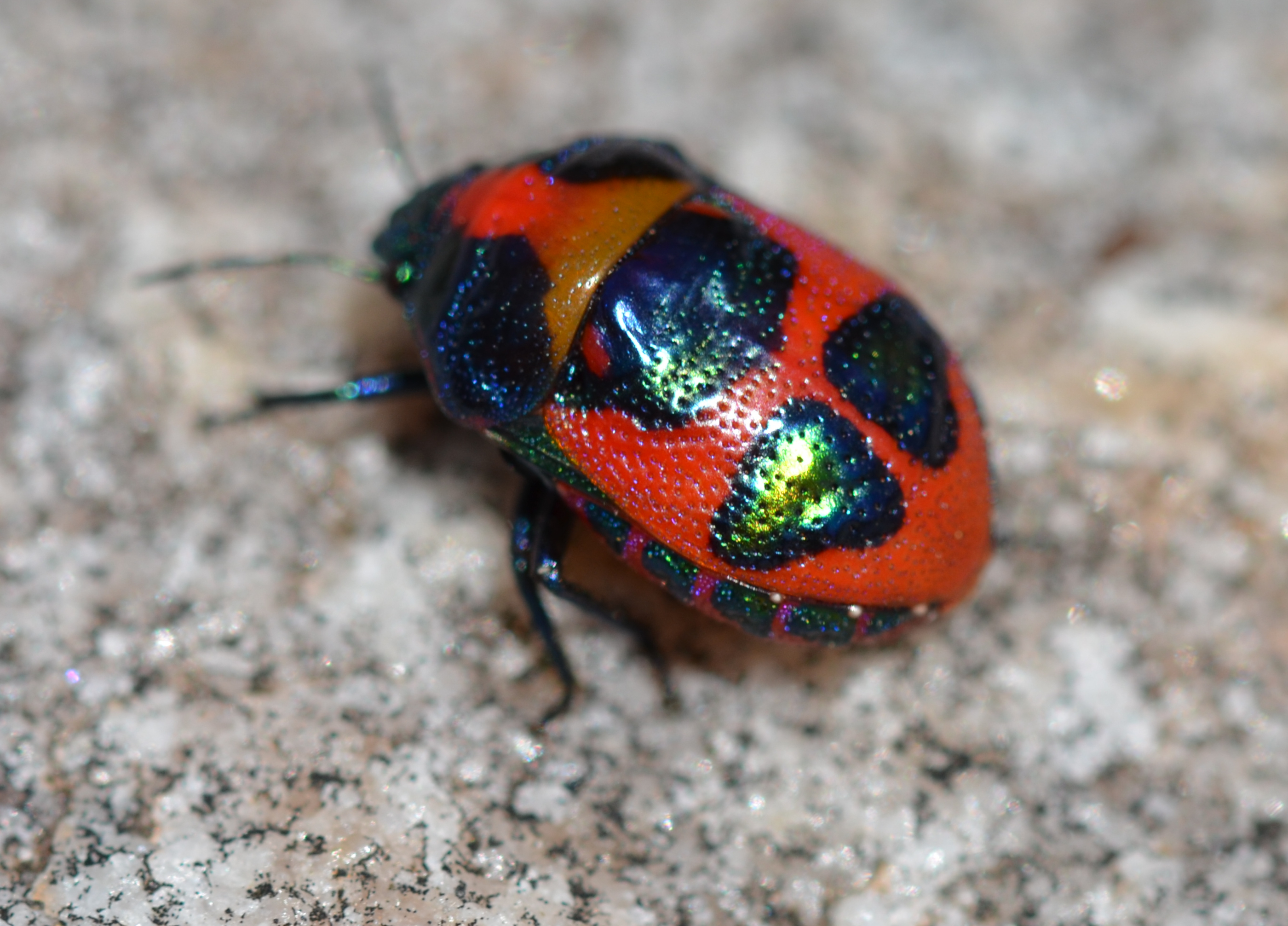

Scientific classification
- Kingdom: Animalia
- Phylum: Arthropoda
- Clade: Pancrustacea
- Class: Insecta
- Order: Hemiptera
- Suborder: Heteroptera
- Family: Scutelleridae
- Genus: Choerocoris
- Species: C. paganus

Binomial name
- Choerocoris paganus (Fabricius, 1775)
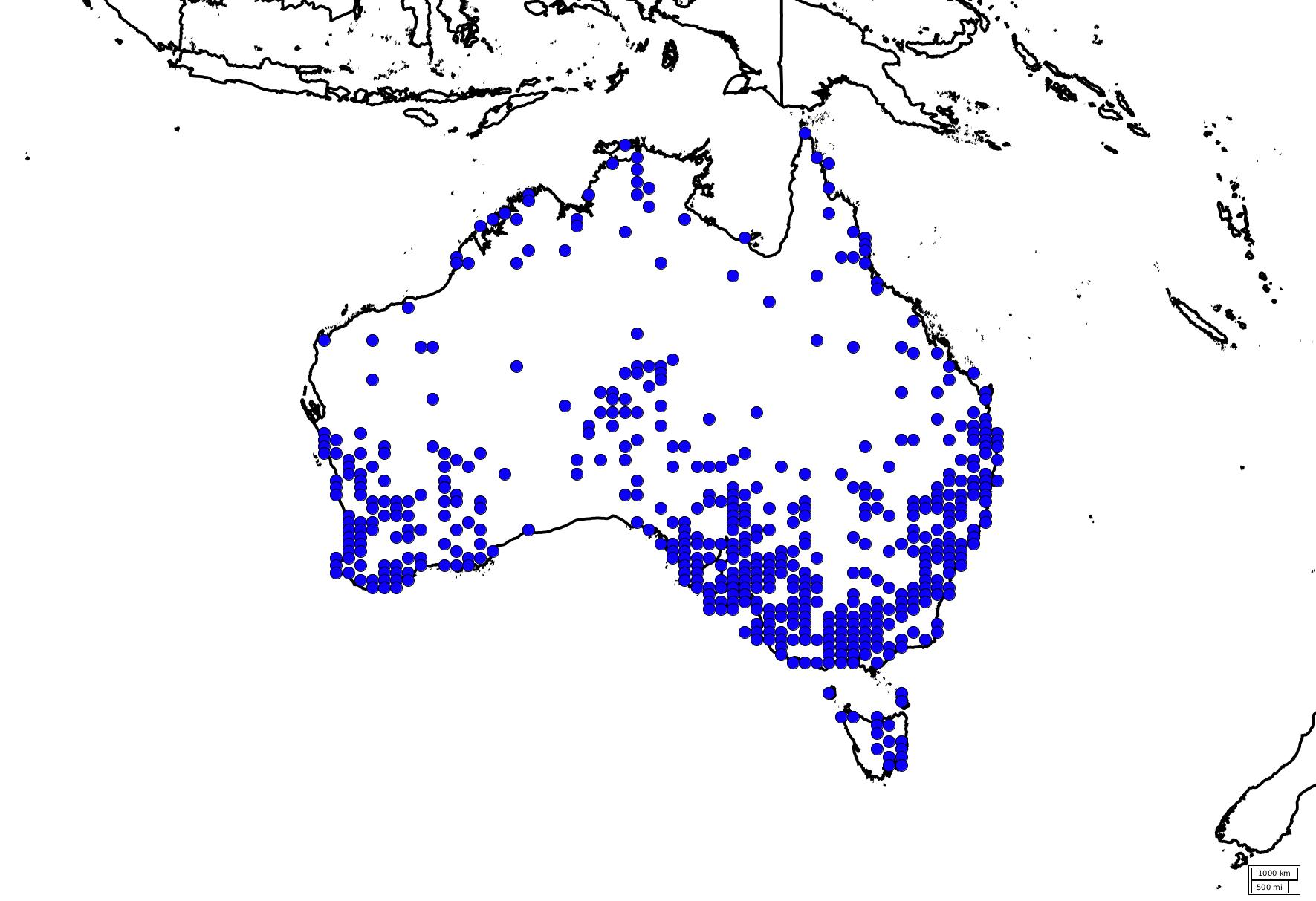
- Choerocoris paganus distribution map: Atlas of Living Australia.

= Choerocoris paganus =

Species of insect

Choerocoris paganus, is a native Australian insect, also commonly known as both the red jewel bug and ground shield bug. This small bug with a body length of 1cm is easily recognisable with its large, mostly crimson scutella with a large blue black blotch towards the front and two small blotches towards the back that have a copper, green hue. The head and legs are dark blue.They are one of the most commonly encountered jewel bugs in Australia and can easily be distinguished from other species by textured areas on and around the pronotum. It is generally not harmful, but can excrete pungent stink fluid if handled roughly.

== Taxonomy ==
The first scientific description of the Australian red jewel bug was made in 1775 by Danish entomologist Johan Christian Fabricius as a species of true bug in the family Scutelleridae, the 'shield backed bugs'. These are not be confused with jewel beetles which are from the order coleoptera with different mouth and wing features.

=== Etymology ===
The genus name Choerocoris is derived its name from the Greek words 'choiros', for its 'pig-like' rounded appearance, and 'koris', for its convex bug shape. The species epithet paganus comes from its latin root 'pagus', which refers to a country district but in biology refers to a species found in rural areas or open scrubland.

== Distribution ==
Choerocoris paganus has a wide distribution around Australia, across all states and territories. It is more densely populated in temperate areas around Australia, but have also been found in low numbers in northern Queensland and the Northern Territory.

== Habitat ==
This bug is found in woodlands and scrublands across Australia and is more densely populated in coastal regions. It is closely associated with plants of the Dodonaea genus and is mostly found within their vicinity, on their branches, or in their debris. Mostly active in summer months, it can be found on rocks, branches and on the ground, retiring under rocks and branches in the night and in cooler months.

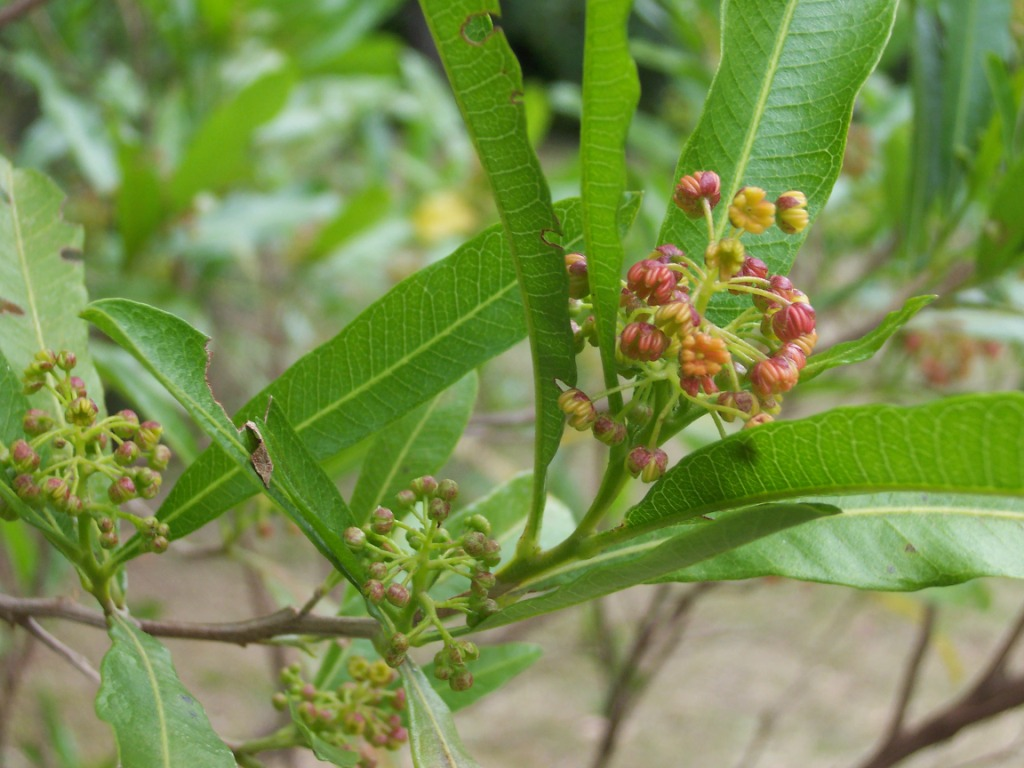
Dodonaea viscosa flowers

== Diet ==
The flower sap and seeds from hop bush, Dodonaea viscosa and Dodonaea triquetra on the east coast, are the primary food source for both adults and nymphs of Choerocoris paganus. It is also a sap sucking bug that attaches to the stems of the Dodonaea plants and other grasses and plantains such as Plantago species. Instars of this species are found in high numbers feeding on Dodonaea seeds that have ripened and fallen to the ground at the end of summer.

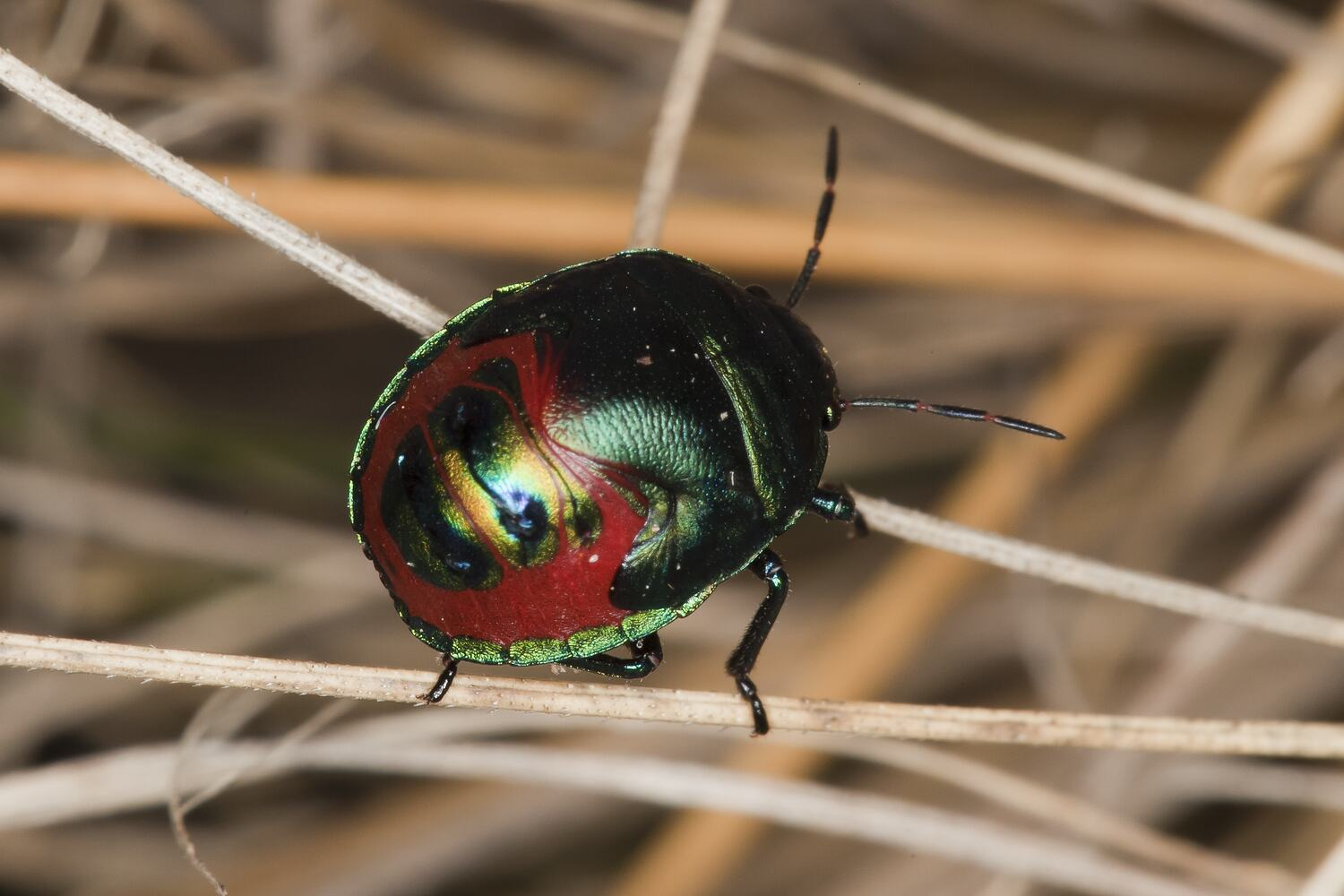
Juveniles feeding on grasses.

== Breeding ==
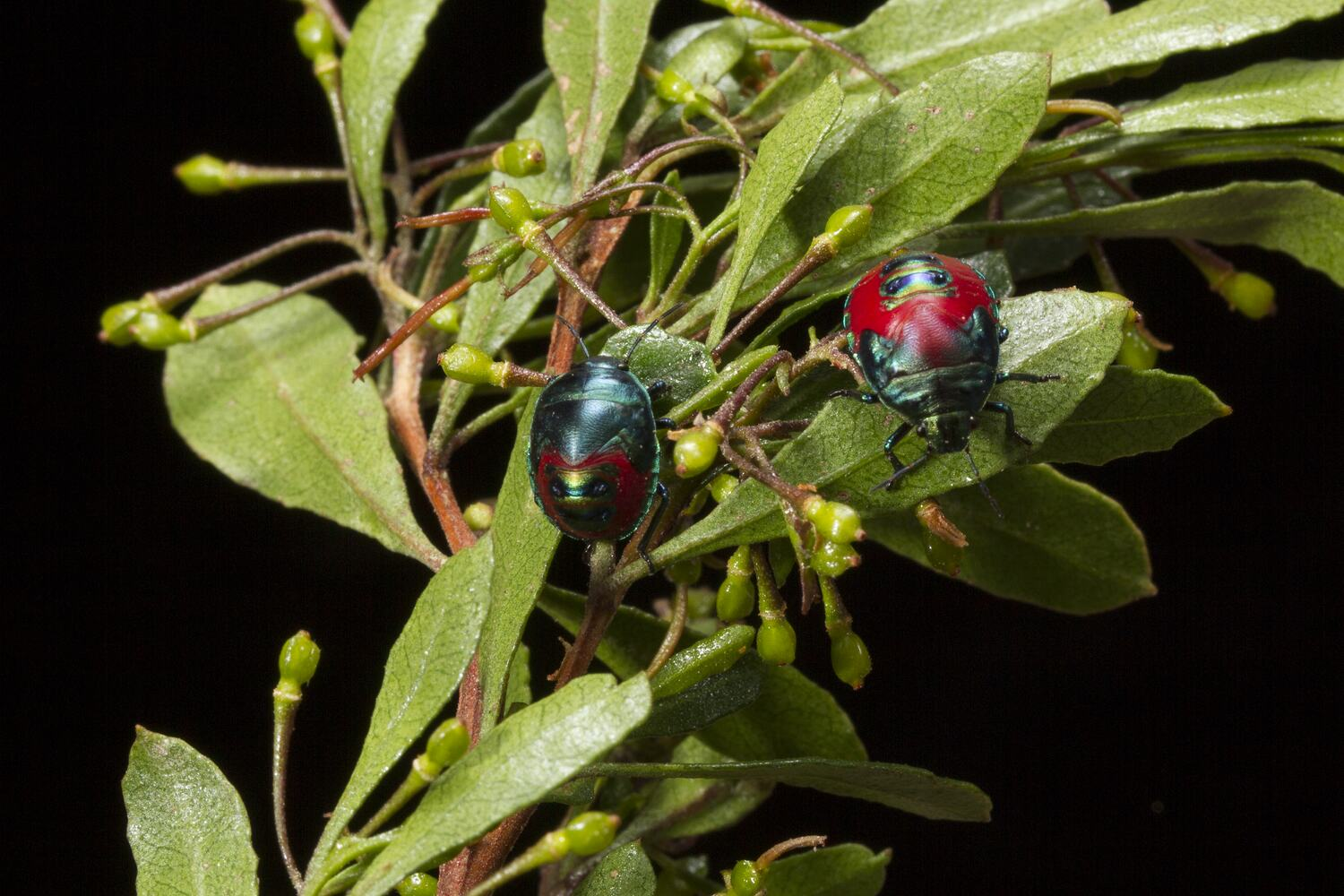
Juveniles

In Australia, the breeding season is from November to February. A week after emerging from hibernation, the breeding cycle begins when the weather is warm and sunny. The male secures copulation by 180 degree rotation of the genital segment (aedeagus) through a segment of the female ovipositor (valvulae) and then remain connected tail to tail for approximately 6 days. The females only mate once but males have been observed to mate twice. After this period has ended, the female lays her first batch of eggs within 1-8 days. C. paganus eggs are laid in grassy debris, attached to the sides and under rocks and twigs. Eggs are laid in rows and usually in two batches containing an average of 53 eggs each. On occasion one batch is laid with 73 eggs. The female then leaves the batch with no further intervention.

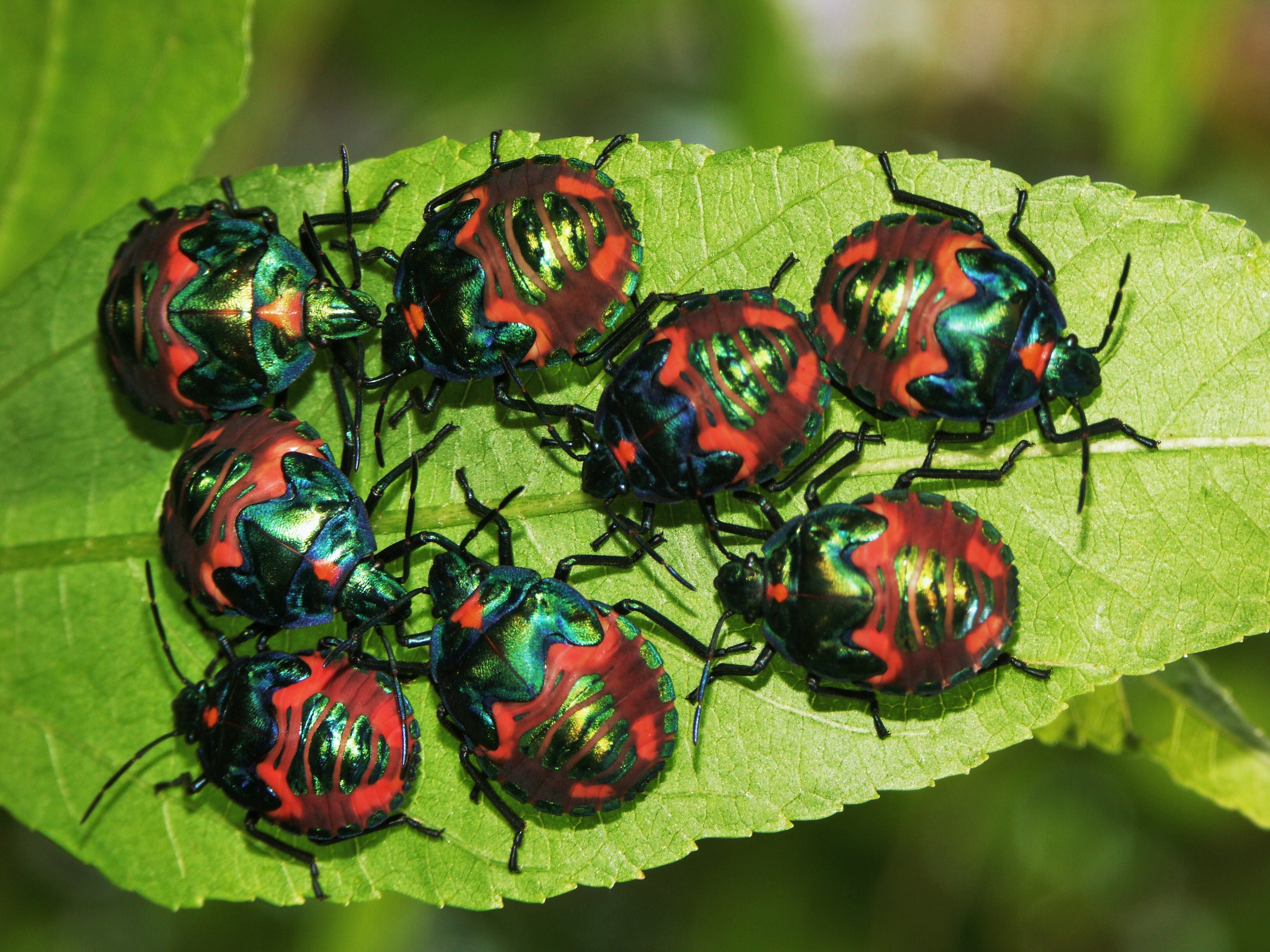
Jewel bug nymphs in creche.

== Life cycle ==
The colourless, barrel shaped 1.1 mm (0.043 in) long eggs are laid and turn from pink to red in 1 week and continue to incubate from 12-21 days depending on weather. The nymph then bursts through the egg with a firm projection on the head known as an 'egg buster', and crawls out of the egg over approximately 20 minutes. The nymph progresses through 5 instars with changing markings over the next 20 days and congregate in creches.

The adult bug reaches 1 cm (0.39 in) in length and lives for approximately 1 year.

== Conservation status ==
C. paganus is currently unlisted in the EPBC Act 1999 or IUCN Red list due to the abundant nature of this species.
