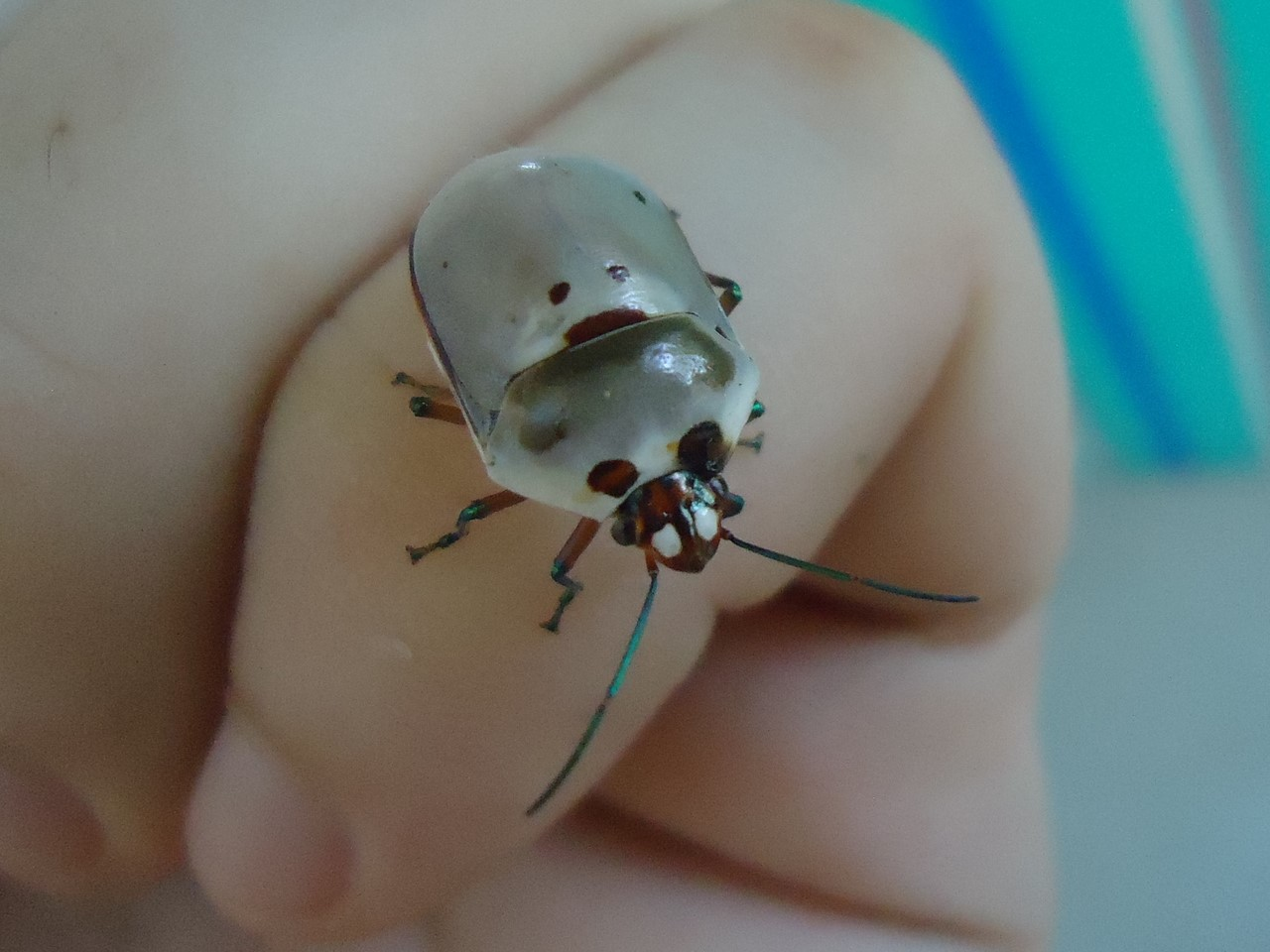

Scientific classification
- Kingdom: Animalia
- Phylum: Arthropoda
- Clade: Pancrustacea
- Class: Insecta
- Order: Hemiptera
- Suborder: Heteroptera
- Family: Scutelleridae
- Genus: Augocoris
- Species: A. illustris

Binomial name
- Augocoris illustris (Fabricius, 1781)

Synonyms
- Cimex illustris Fabricius, 1781

= Augocoris illustris =

Species of true bug

Augocoris illustris is a species of shield-backed bug in the family Scutelleridae. It is found in the Caribbean Sea, Central America, North America, and South America.
