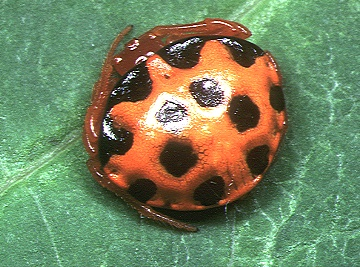
- Female P. tsushimensis
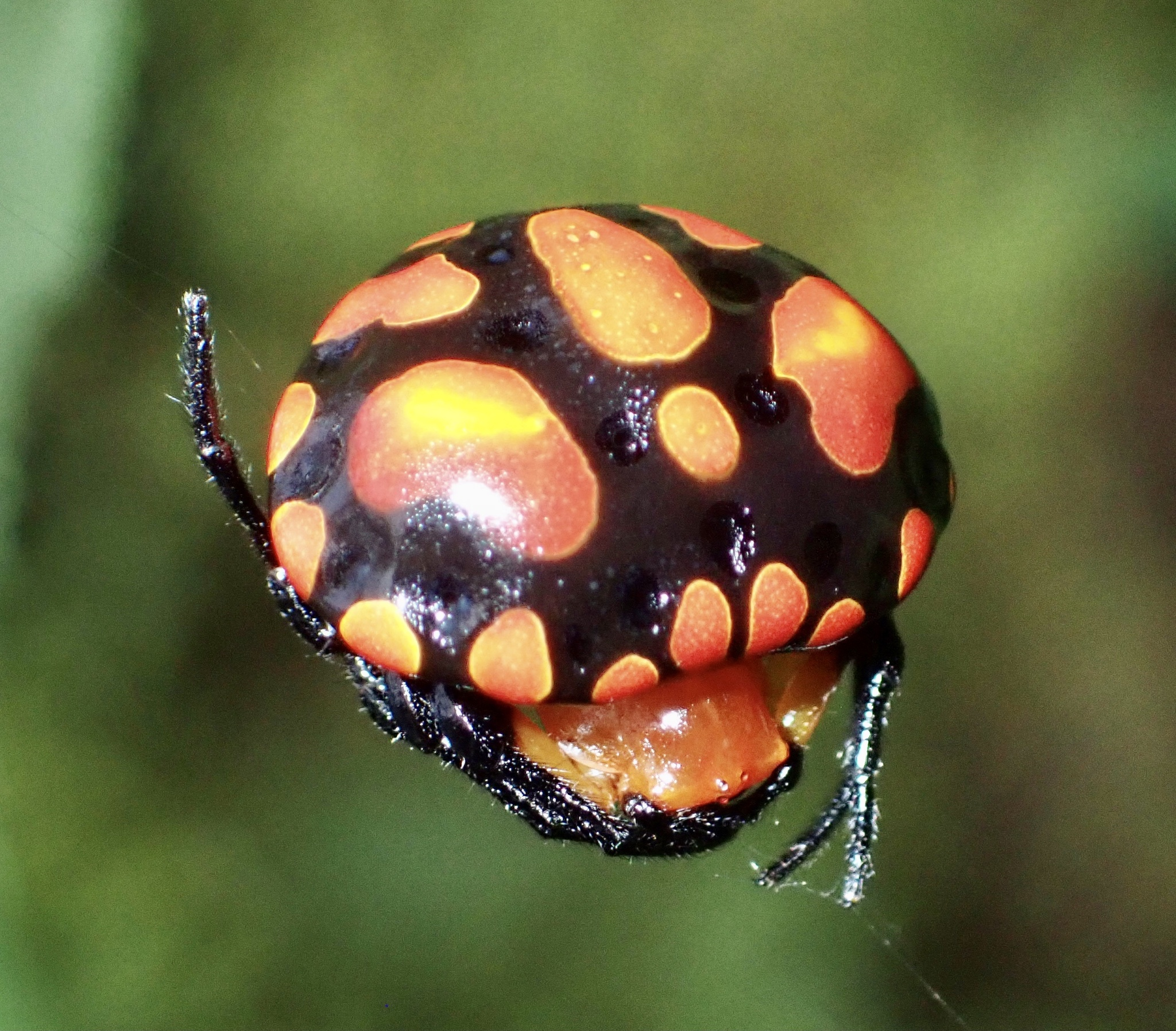
- P. thorntoni

Scientific classification
- Kingdom: Animalia
- Phylum: Arthropoda
- Subphylum: Chelicerata
- Class: Arachnida
- Order: Araneae
- Infraorder: Araneomorphae
- Family: Araneidae
- Subfamily: Cyrtarachninae s.l.
- Genus: Paraplectana; Brito Capello, 1867

Type species
- P. thorntoni (Blackwall, 1865)

Species
- 13, see text

= Paraplectana =

Genus of spiders

Paraplectana is a genus of Asian and African orb-weaver spiders first described by F. de Brito Capello in 1867.

== Description ==
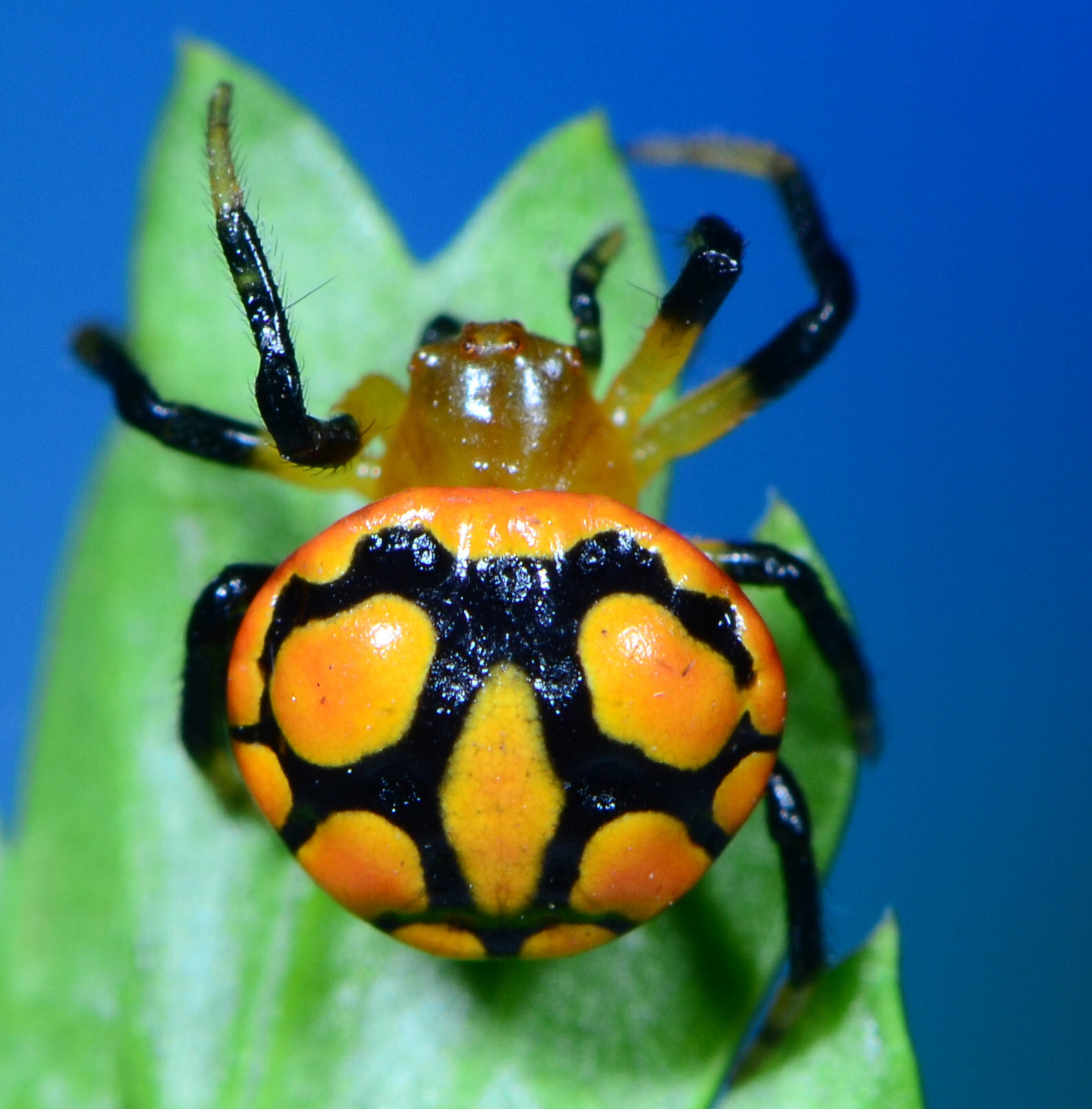
Paraplectana sp. from South Africa

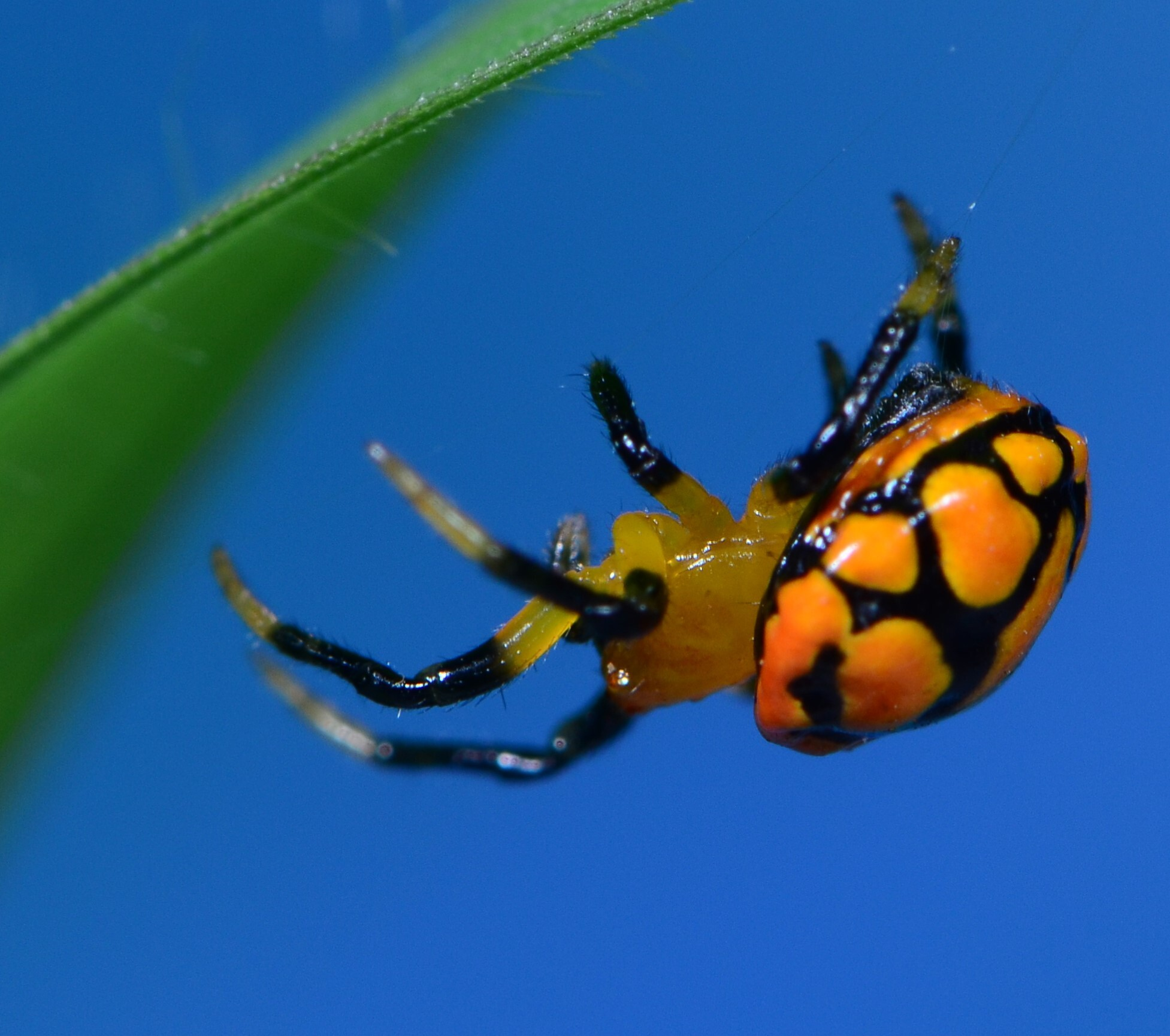

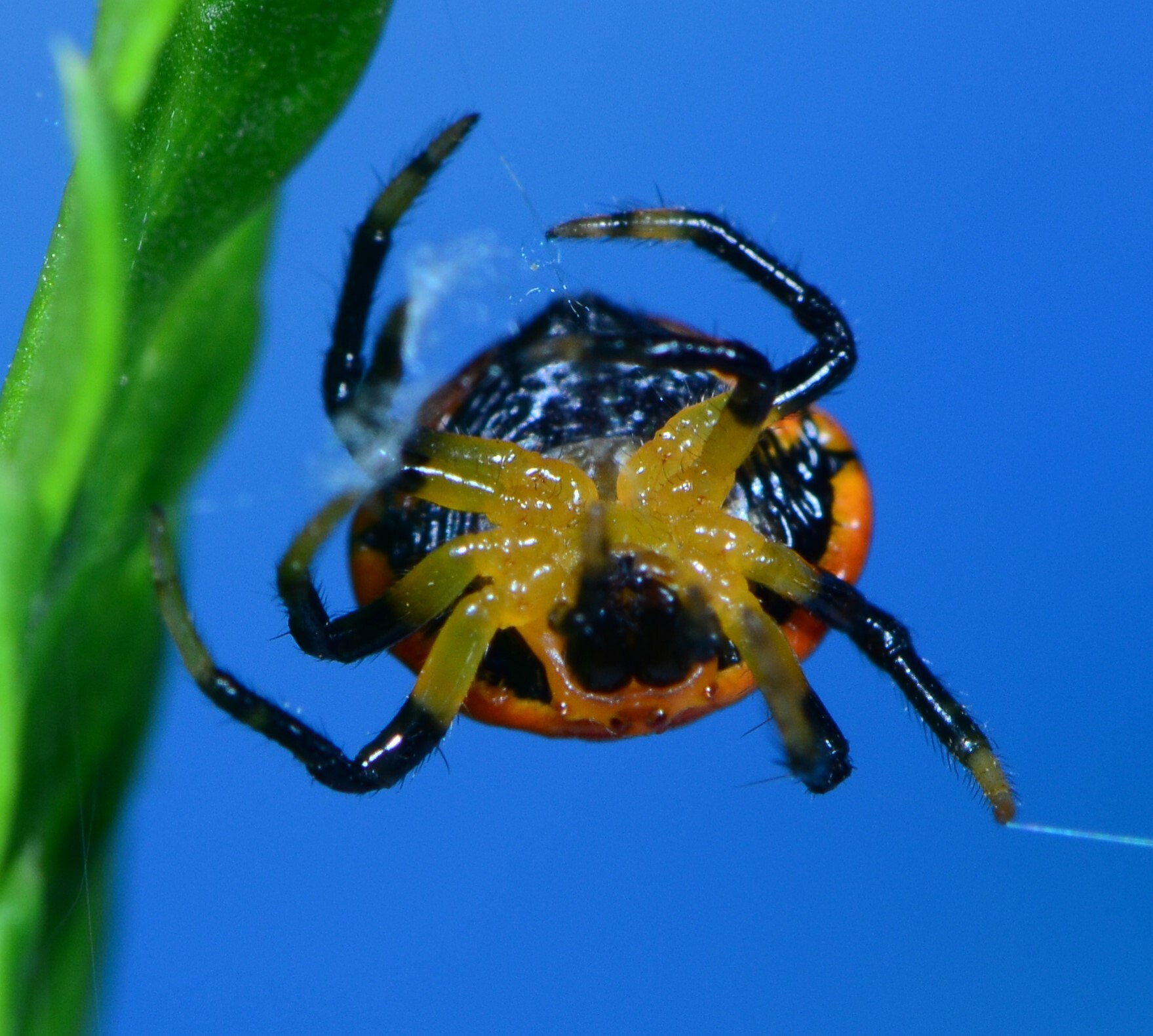

Paraplectana is distinguished by its round body and bright colour. Total length is 11–16 mm in females. In contrast with the uniformly pale brown carapace, the abdomen is shiny with bright red, yellow or orange patches on a dark background, resembling a ladybird beetle. The round abdomen almost completely covers the carapace. Their thin legs are arranged around the carapace.

Males are still unknown for the genus.

== Species ==
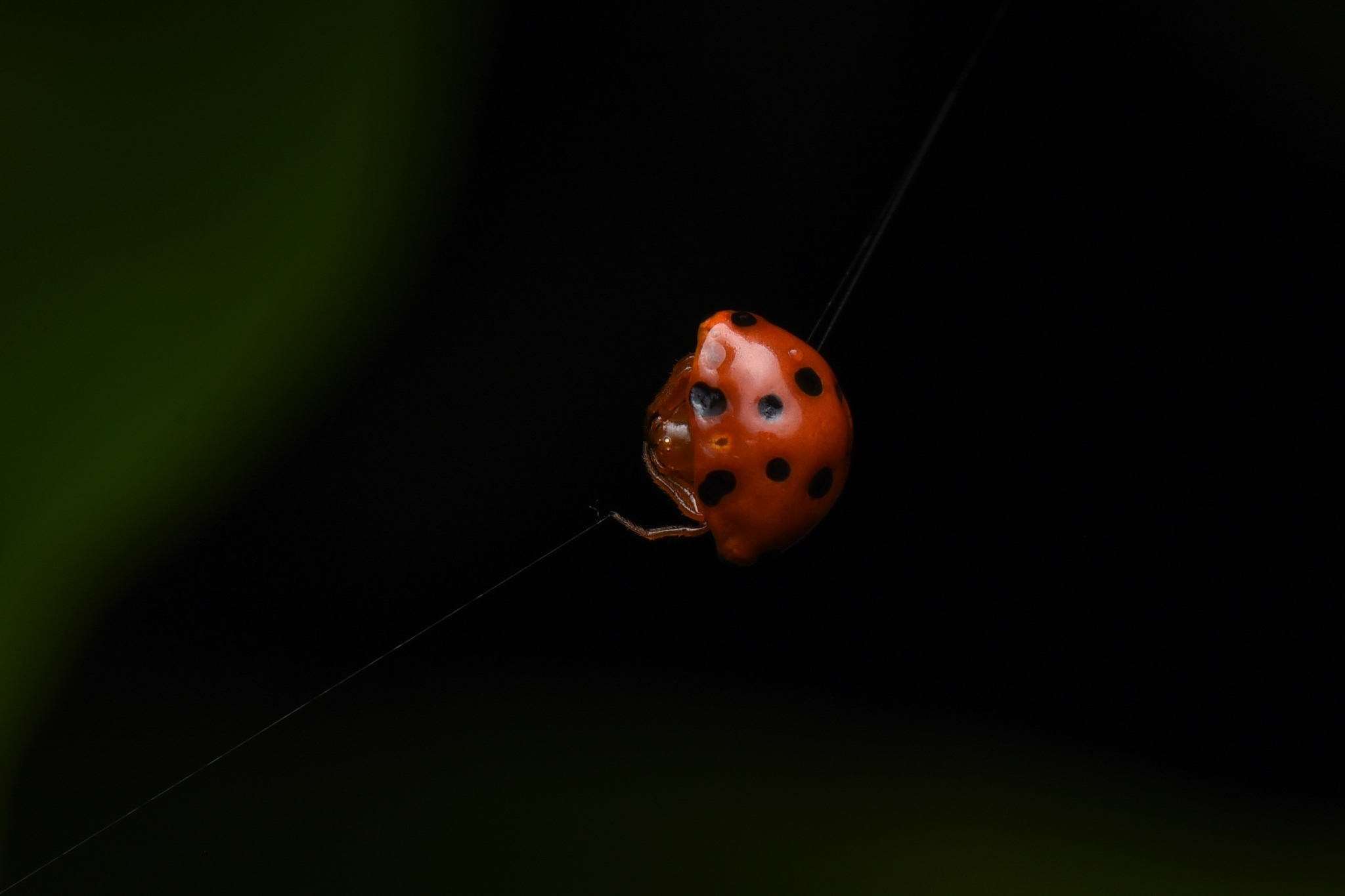
P. rajashree from India

As of November 2026, this genus includes thirteen species:

- Paraplectana coccinella (Thorell, 1890) – Myanmar, Indonesia (Nias Is.)
- Paraplectana duodecimmaculata Simon, 1897 – Indonesia (Java)
- Paraplectana gravelyi (Tikader, 1961) – India
- Paraplectana hemisphaerica (C. L. Koch, 1844) – Sierra Leone
- Paraplectana kittenbergeri Caporiacco, 1947 – Tanzania
- Paraplectana magnaculata Lin & Li, 2022 – China
- Paraplectana mamoniae Basumatary & Brahma, 2019 – India, China
- Paraplectana multimaculata Thorell, 1899 – Cameroon, East Africa
- Paraplectana rajashree Ahmed, Sumukha, Khalap, Mohan & Jadhav, 2015 – India
- Paraplectana sakaguchii Uyemura, 1938 – China, Korea, Japan
- Paraplectana thorntoni (Blackwall, 1865) – Africa, Madagascar, Yemen (type species)
- Paraplectana tsushimensis Yamaguchi, 1960 – China, Taiwan, Japan
- Paraplectana walleri (Blackwall, 1865) – West, Central, Southern Africa, Madagascar
