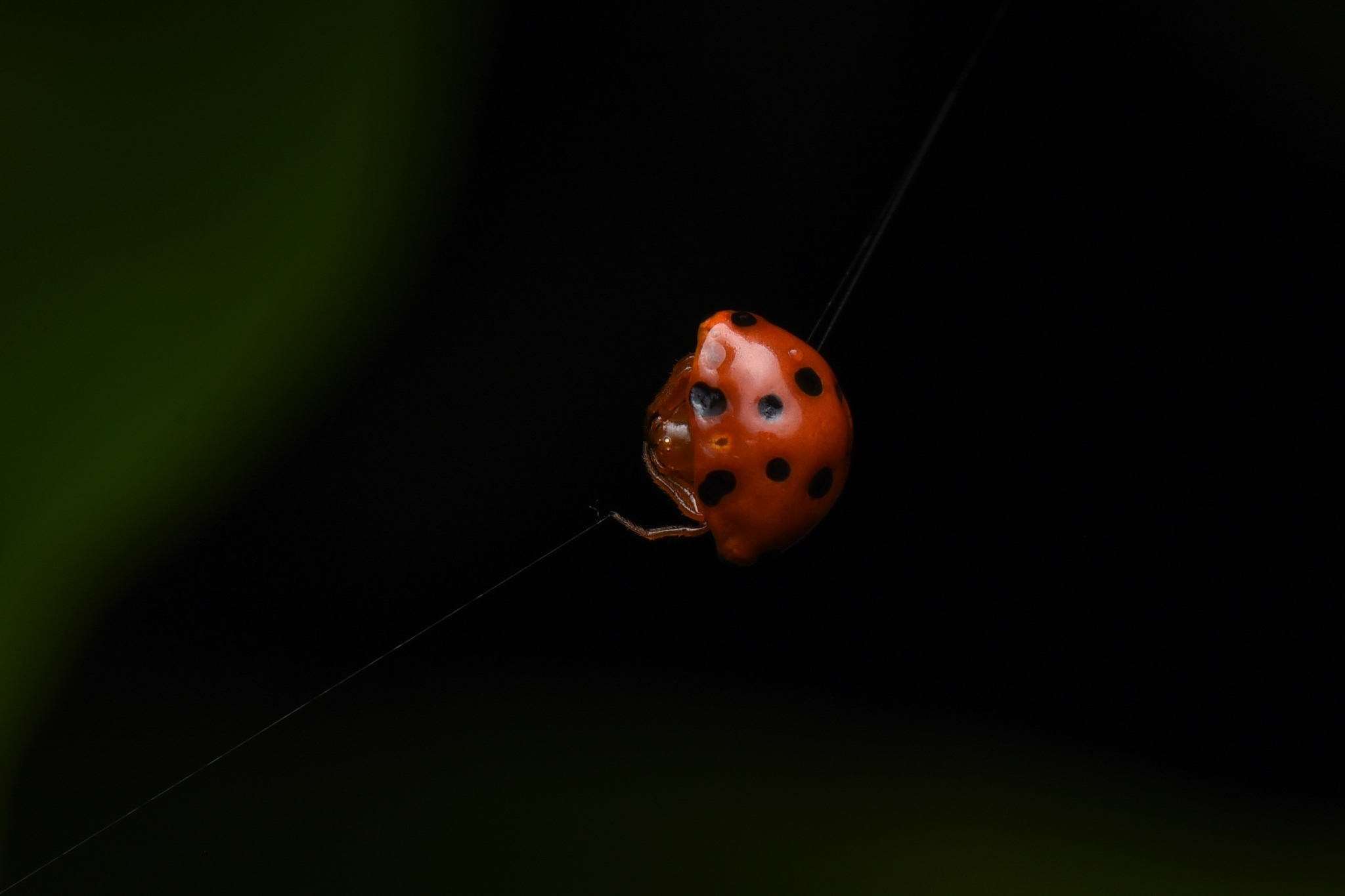

Scientific classification
- Kingdom: Animalia
- Phylum: Arthropoda
- Subphylum: Chelicerata
- Class: Arachnida
- Order: Araneae
- Infraorder: Araneomorphae
- Family: Araneidae
- Genus: Paraplectana
- Species: P. rajashree

Binomial name
- Paraplectana rajashree Ahmed, Sumukha, Khalap, Mohan & Jadhav, 2015

= Paraplectana rajashree =

Species of spider

Paraplectana rajashree is a species of ladybird-mimicking spider described in 2015 from the Western Ghats of Karnataka, India.
