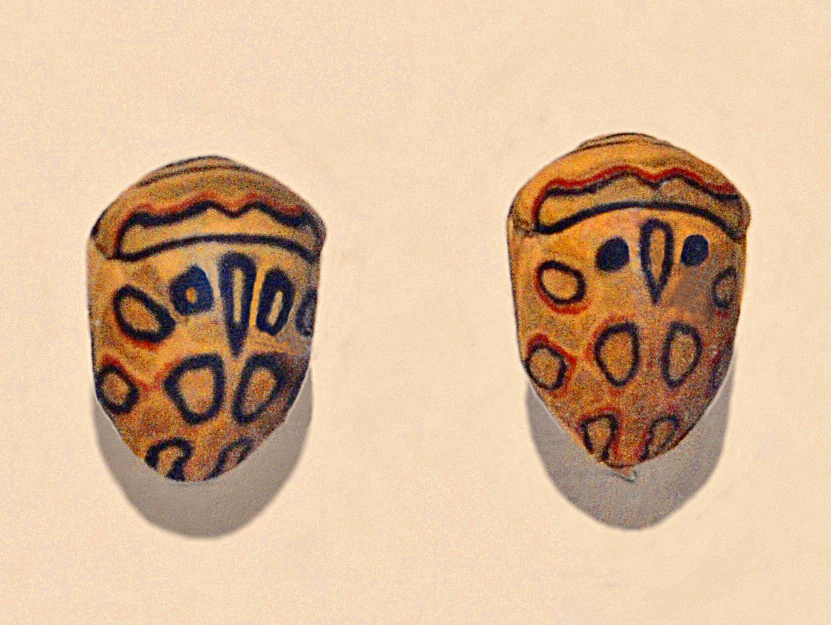
- Sphaerocoris annulus

Scientific classification
- Kingdom: Animalia
- Phylum: Arthropoda
- Class: Insecta
- Order: Hemiptera
- Suborder: Heteroptera
- Family: Scutelleridae
- Subfamily: Scutellerinae
- Genus: Sphaerocoris; Burmeister, 1835

= Sphaerocoris =

Genus of true bugs

Sphaerocoris is a genus of African shield-backed bugs belonging to the family Scutelleridae.

== Species ==
Species in this genus include:

- Sphaerocoris annulus Fabr.
- Sphaerocoris argus Stal
- Sphaerocoris bipustulatus
- Sphaerocoris circuliferus Walker 1867
- Sphaerocoris impluviatus Germar 1839
- Sphaerocoris lateritia Westwood in F. W. Hope 1837
- Sphaerocoris misella Stal
- Sphaerocoris ocellatus Klug in H. Burmeister 1835
- Sphaerocoris polysticta Westwood in F. W. Hope 1837
- Sphaerocoris punctaria Westwood. in F. W. Hope 1837
- Sphaerocoris quadrinotata Westwood in F. W. Hope 1837
- Sphaerocoris rusticus (Fab.)
- Sphaerocoris simplex Herrich-S. 1836
- Sphaerocoris subnotatus Walker 1868
- Sphaerocoris testudogrisea De Geer
- Sphaerocoris tigrinus Germar 1839
- Sphaerocoris unicolor Dall.
