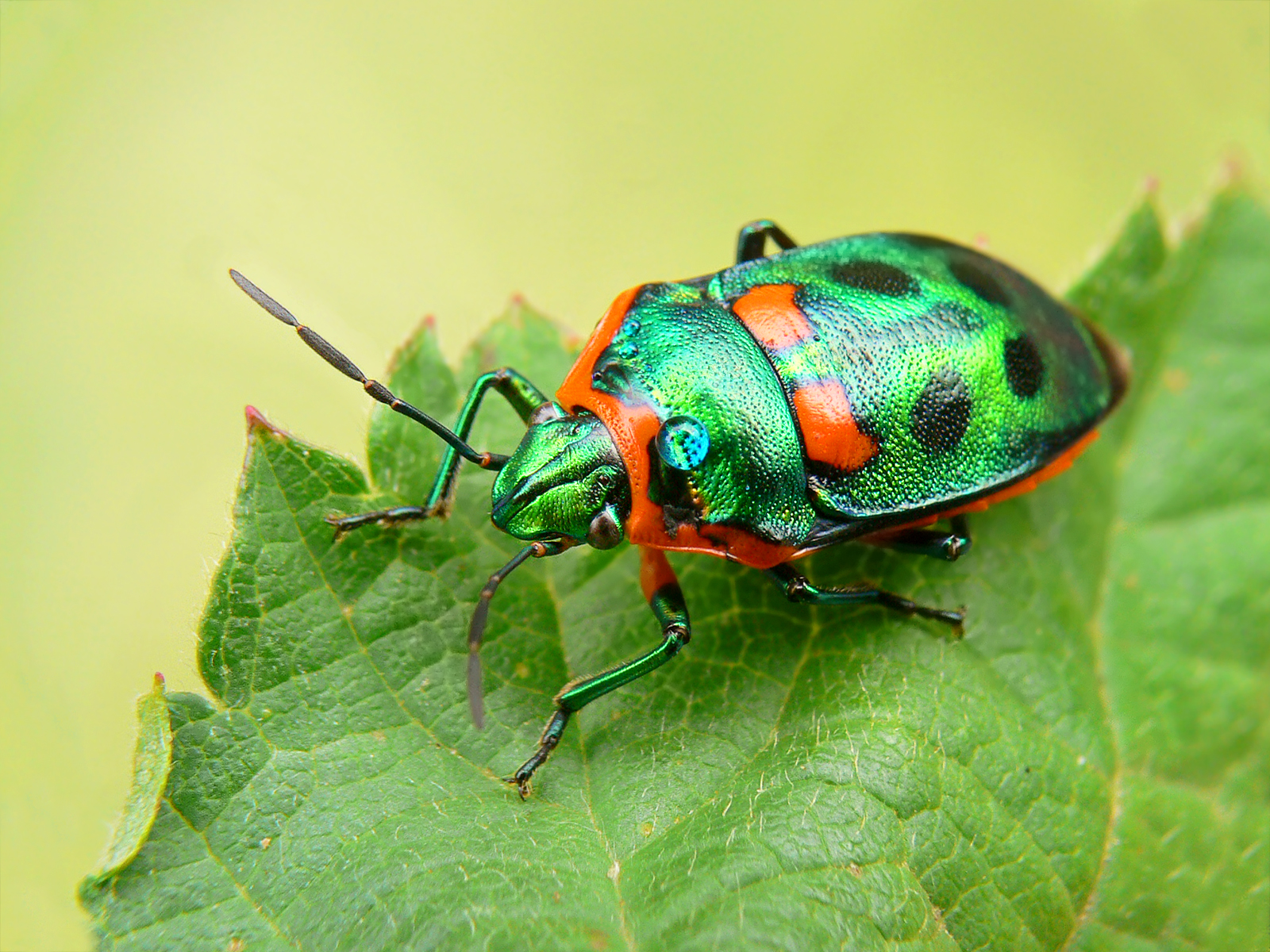
- Scutiphora pedicellata, a jewel bug from Australia
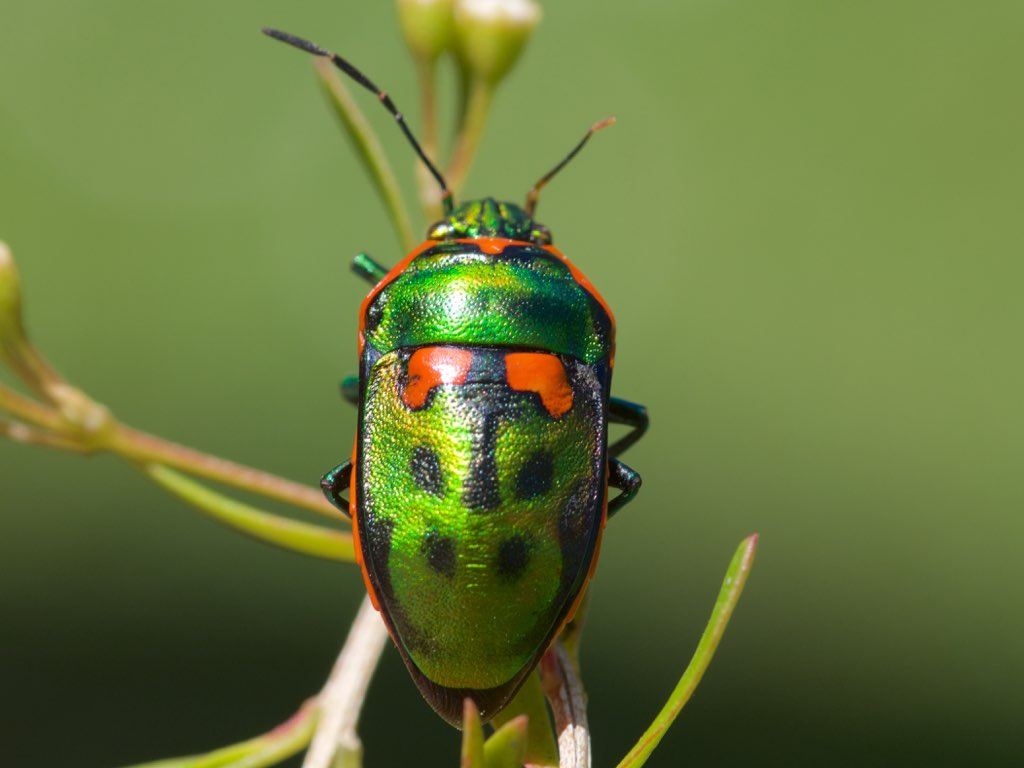

Scientific classification
- Kingdom: Animalia
- Phylum: Arthropoda
- Clade: Pancrustacea
- Class: Insecta
- Order: Hemiptera
- Suborder: Heteroptera
- Family: Scutelleridae
- Subfamily: Scutellerinae
- Tribe: Scutellerini
- Genus: Scutiphora; Guérin-Méneville, 1831
- Species: S. pedicellata

Binomial name
- Scutiphora pedicellata (Kirby, 1826)

= Scutiphora =

Species of true bug

Scutiphora is a monotypic genus containing S. pedicellata, which is a species of insect in the jewel bug family. The species is found around the eastern coast of Australia in New South Wales, Queensland, South Australia, Tasmania, Victoria.
