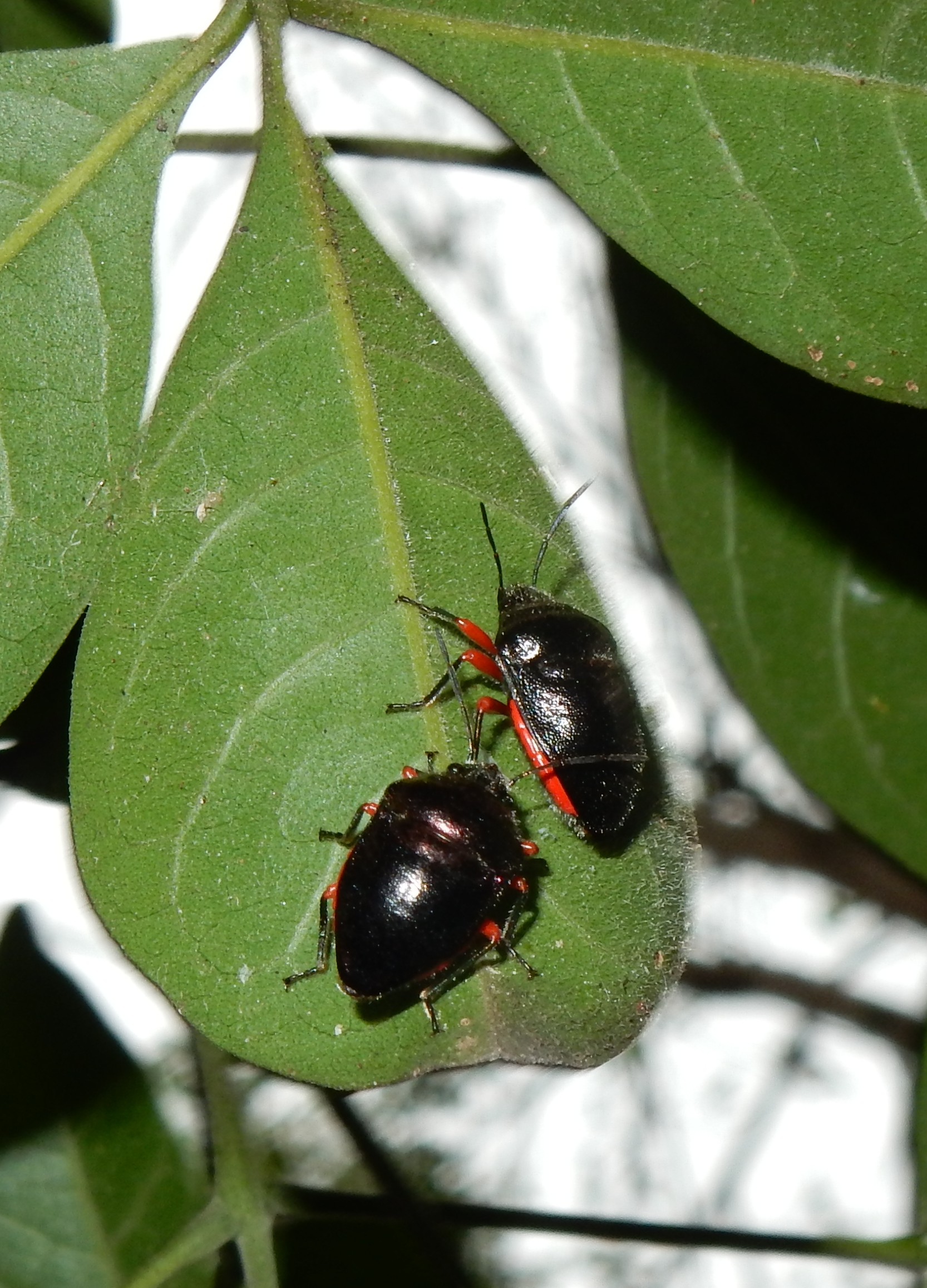

Scientific classification
- Domain: Eukaryota
- Kingdom: Animalia
- Phylum: Arthropoda
- Class: Insecta
- Order: Hemiptera
- Suborder: Heteroptera
- Family: Scutelleridae
- Genus: Lampromicra
- Species: L. aerea

Binomial name
- Lampromicra aerea Distant 1892

= Lampromicra aerea =

Species of true bug

Lampromicra aerea is an Australian species of jewel bug in the family Scutelleridae.
