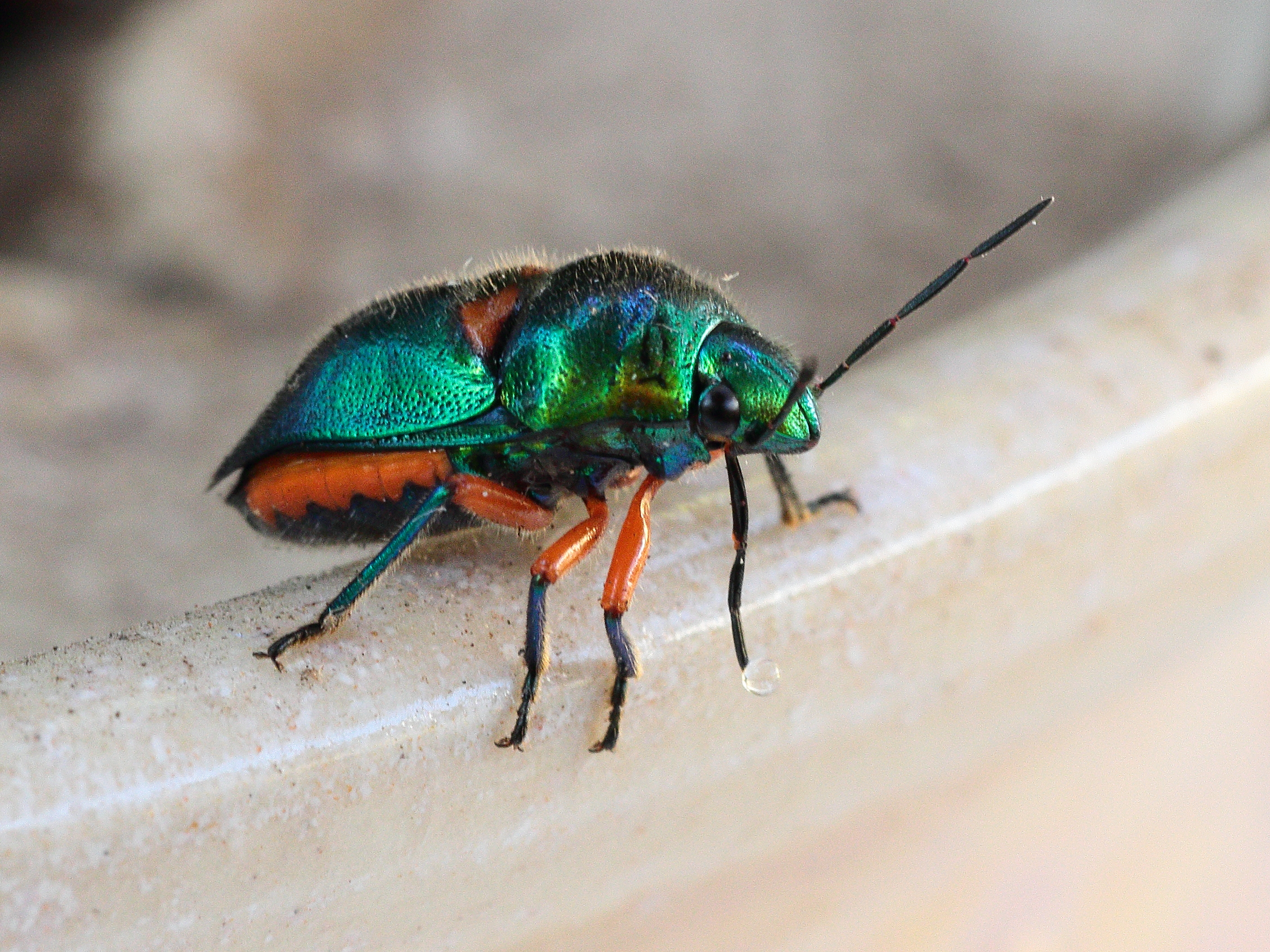

Scientific classification
- Kingdom: Animalia
- Phylum: Arthropoda
- Class: Insecta
- Order: Hemiptera
- Suborder: Heteroptera
- Family: Scutelleridae
- Genus: Lampromicra
- Species: L. senator

Binomial name
- Lampromicra senator (Fabricius, 1803)

= Lampromicra senator =

Species of true bug

Lampromicra senator is an Australian species of insect in the family Scutelleridae, commonly known as the green jewel bug.

== Distribution ==
The species is found in the states of New South Wales, Queensland, Northern Territory and Western Australia.

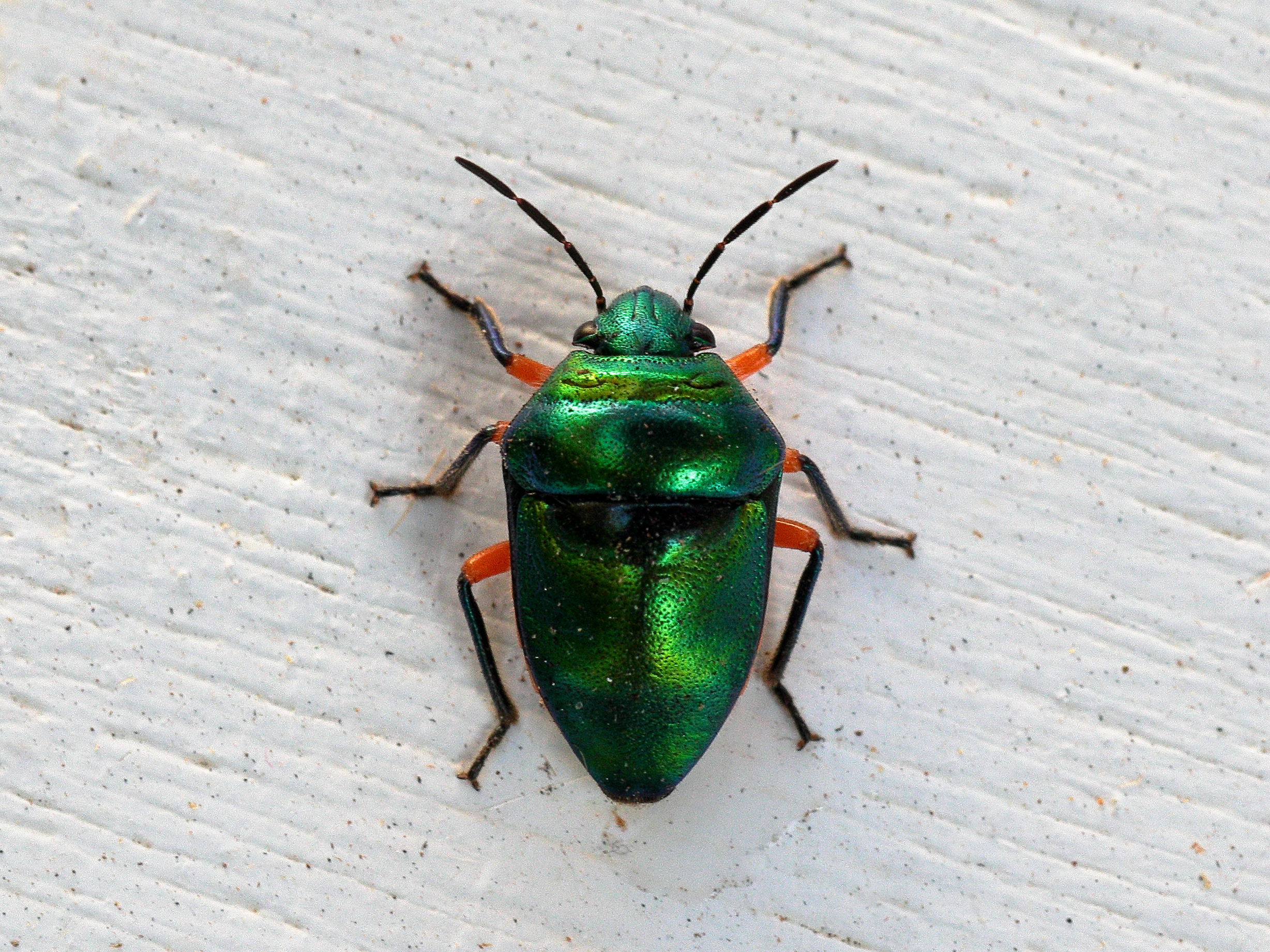
Dorsal view

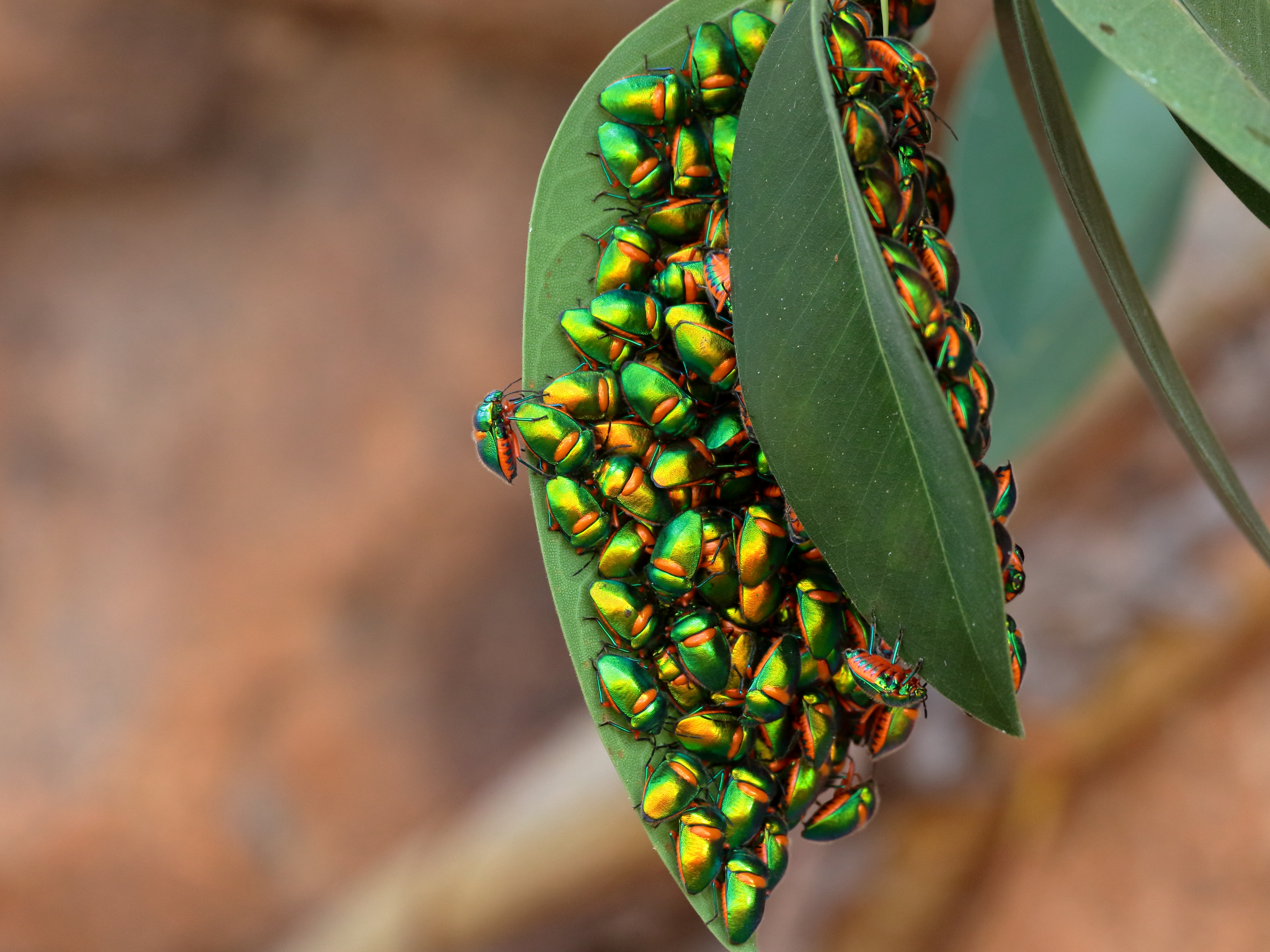
Jewel bugs feeding on a figtree leaf, Queensland
