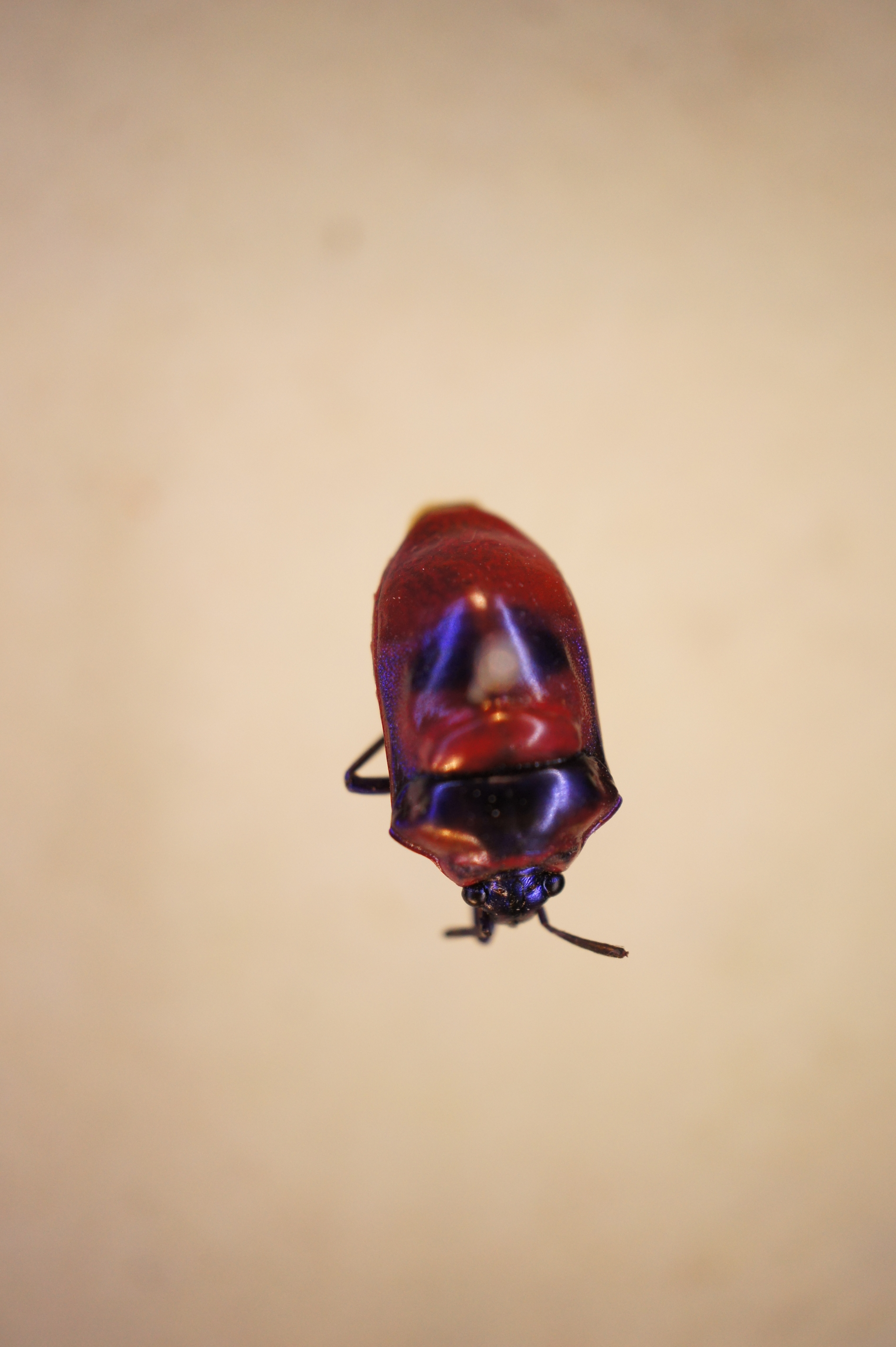

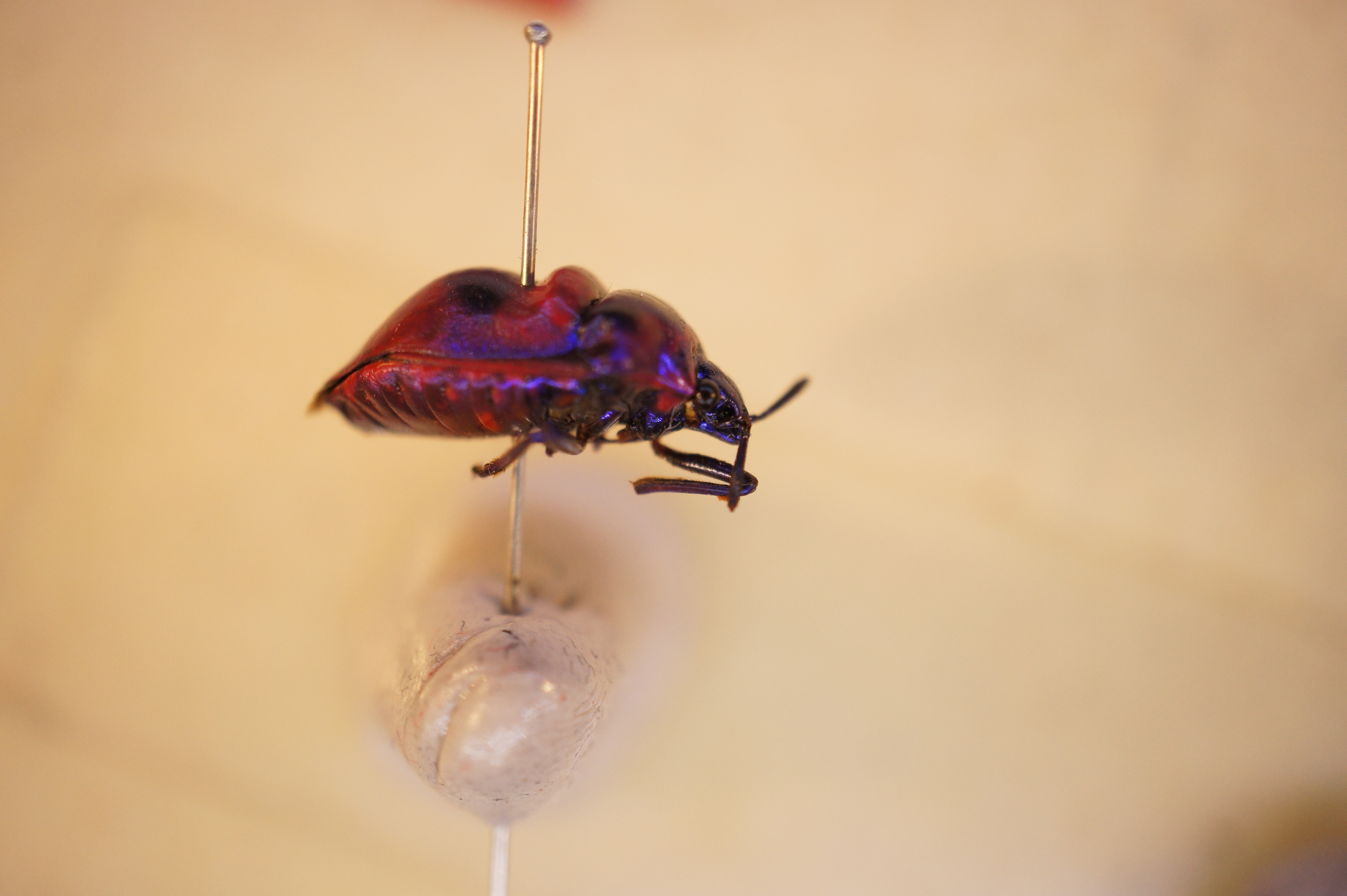
- Cosmocoris trabeatus schultzeanus

Scientific classification
- Kingdom: Animalia
- Phylum: Arthropoda
- Clade: Pancrustacea
- Class: Insecta
- Order: Hemiptera
- Suborder: Heteroptera
- Family: Scutelleridae
- Subfamily: Scutellerinae
- Tribe: Scutellerini
- Genus: Cosmocoris; Stål, 1864

= Cosmocoris =

Genus of true bugs

Cosmocoris is a genus of Asian jewel or shield-backed bugs in the tribe Scutellerini, erected by Carl Stål in 1864; records of occurrence are from the Philippines.

== Species ==
The following further species names have been found:

- Cosmocoris coxalis (Stål, 1864)
- Cosmocoris sellatus Stål: which was placed in the genus "Callidea" [sic] by Francis Walker.
