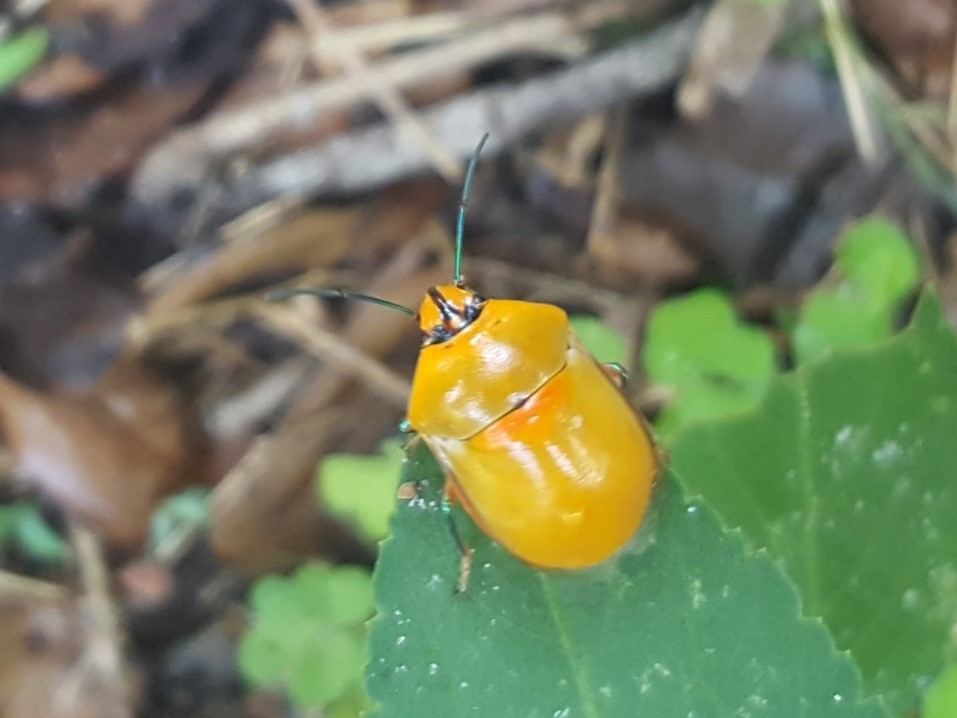
- Augocoris illustris

Scientific classification
- Kingdom: Animalia
- Phylum: Arthropoda
- Class: Insecta
- Order: Hemiptera
- Suborder: Heteroptera
- Family: Scutelleridae
- Tribe: Scutellerini
- Genus: Augocoris; Burmeister, 1835

= Augocoris =

Genus of true bugs

Augocoris is a genus of shield-backed bugs in the tribe Scutellerini, from the Americas.

== Species ==
Biolib includes:

1. Augocoris ehrenbergii Germar, 1839
2. Augocoris gomesii Burmeister, 1835
3. Augocoris illustris (Fabricius, 1781)
4. Augocoris nigripennis Dallas, 1851
5. Augocoris pallidus Herrich-Schäffer, 1836
6. Augocoris poeyi Uhler
7. Augocoris rufus Dallas
8. Augocoris rugulosus Herrich-Schäffer, 1838
