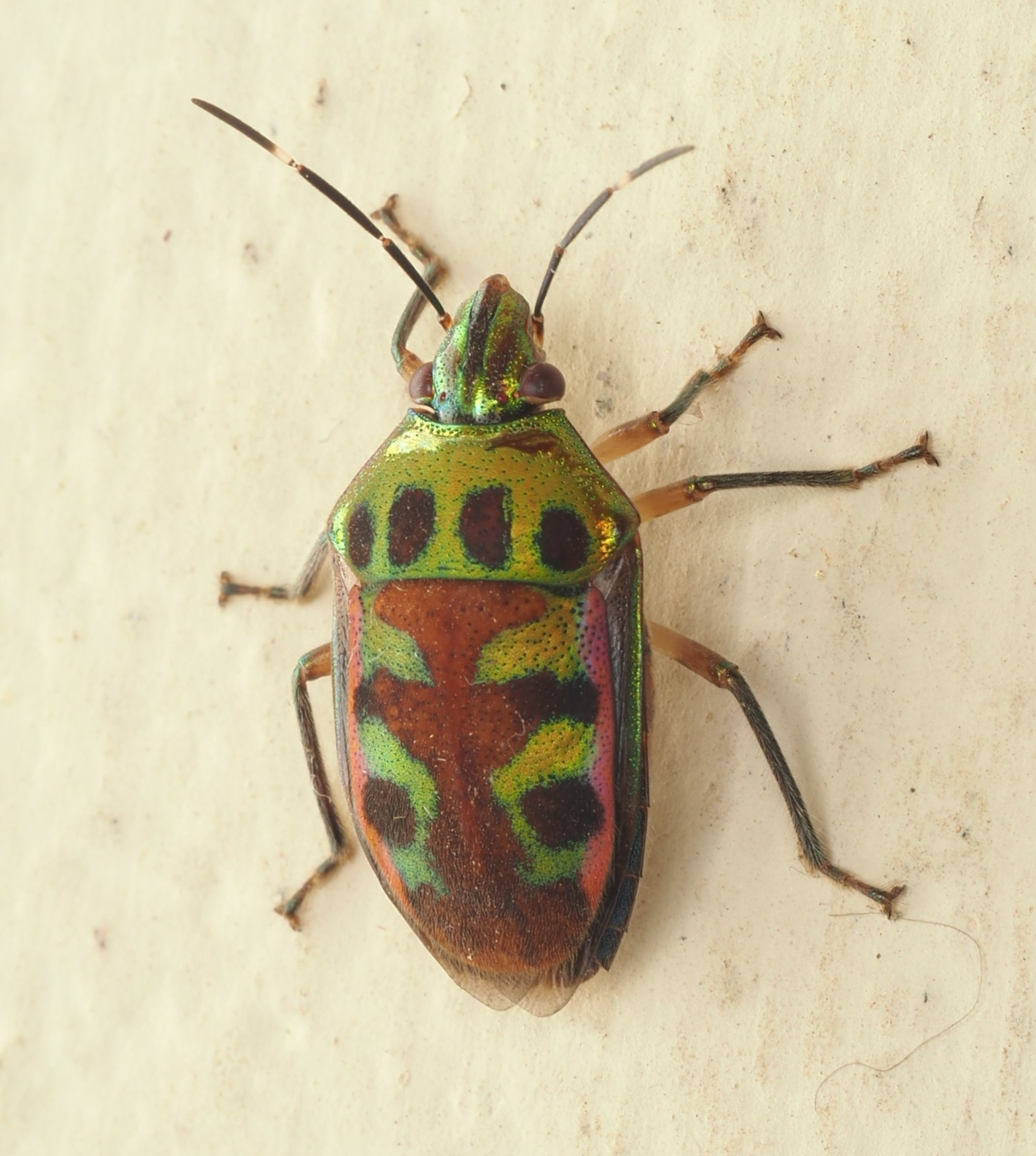

Scientific classification
- Domain: Eukaryota
- Kingdom: Animalia
- Phylum: Arthropoda
- Class: Insecta
- Order: Hemiptera
- Suborder: Heteroptera
- Family: Scutelleridae
- Subfamily: Scutellerinae
- Tribe: Scutellerini
- Genus: Tetrarthria; Dallas, 1851
- Species: T. variegata

Binomial name
- Tetrarthria variegata Dallas, 1851

Synonyms
- Tetrarthria quinquemaculata Dohrn, 1864; Tetrarthria congrua Walker, 1868; Tetrarthria lateralis Walker, 1868; Tetrarthria linetata Walker, 1868; Tetrarthria maculata Walker, 1869; Tetrarthria varia Walker, 1868; Tetrarthria marginepunctata Vollenhoven, 1863

= Tetrarthria =

Genus of plant bugs

Tetrarthria variegata is a species of plant bug in the family Scutelleridae. It is highly variable in its patterning and coloration and only one species is recognized in the genus. The species is widely distributed in South and Southeast Asia. The genus is unique in the family in having a four-segmented antenna. The coloration varies, some forms being a uniform creamy brown while others are patterned, and in the past several of the colour forms were described as species. It feeds on many agricultural crop plants where it is considered as a pest. The species is widely distributed within Asia and spreads with agriculture. They have been seen as far east as Japan.

The species was described and given a binomial name by William Sweetland Dallas in 1851. He placed it in a new genus of its own. The type specimen came from the Philippines and was part of a collection made by Hugh Cuming. The tip of the membrane of the hindwing juts out slightly at rest. The tip of the proboscis (labium) reaches past the middle of the abdomen. There is slight furrow on the abdominal ventrites within which the proboscis is held but no furrow on the sternal region. The head has a central lobe that protrudes and the rostrum tip reaches the hind margin of the fourth ventral segment. The antenna has a short basal segment which falls short of the tip of the head. The remaining three segments have the second and fourth of about the same length and twice as long as the first. The third segment is the longest being the length of the first and second combined. The legs have three tarsi.

The species Tetrarthria flagrans described by Walker in 1867 is now placed in the genus Paracalliphara while Tetrarthria nigra which was also described by Walker in 1867 is a synonym of Calliphara praslinia.

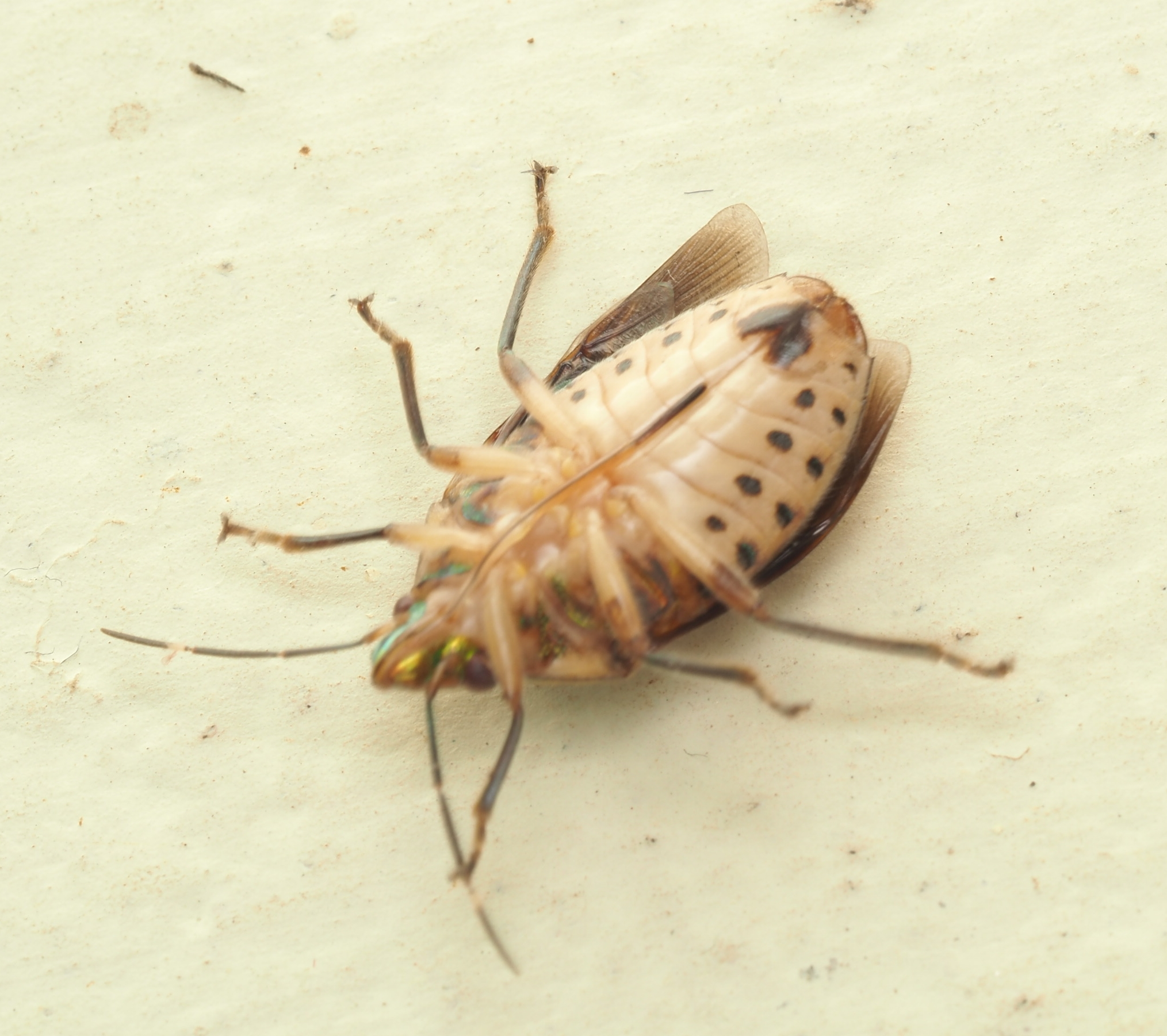
Underside showing proboscis
