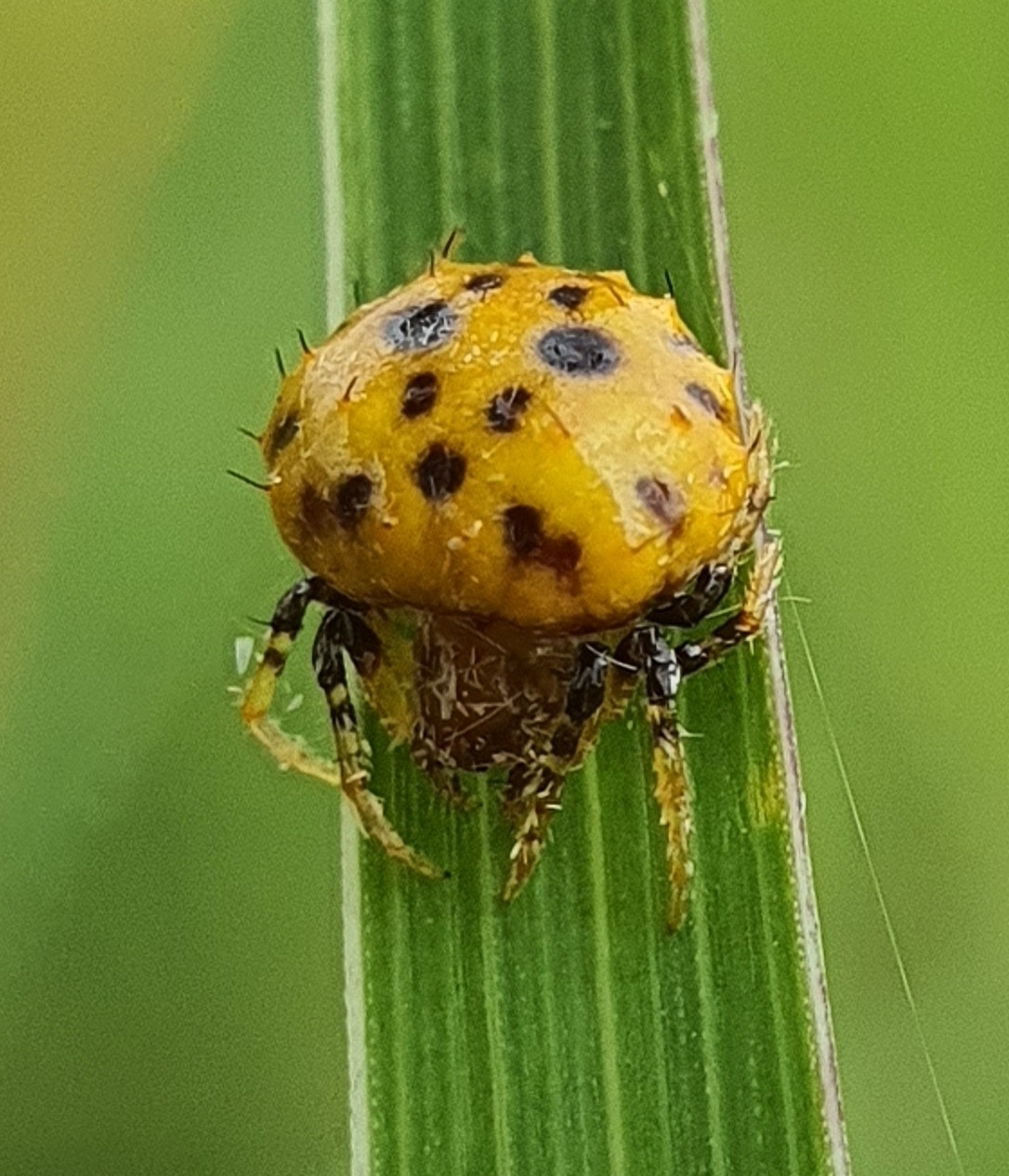

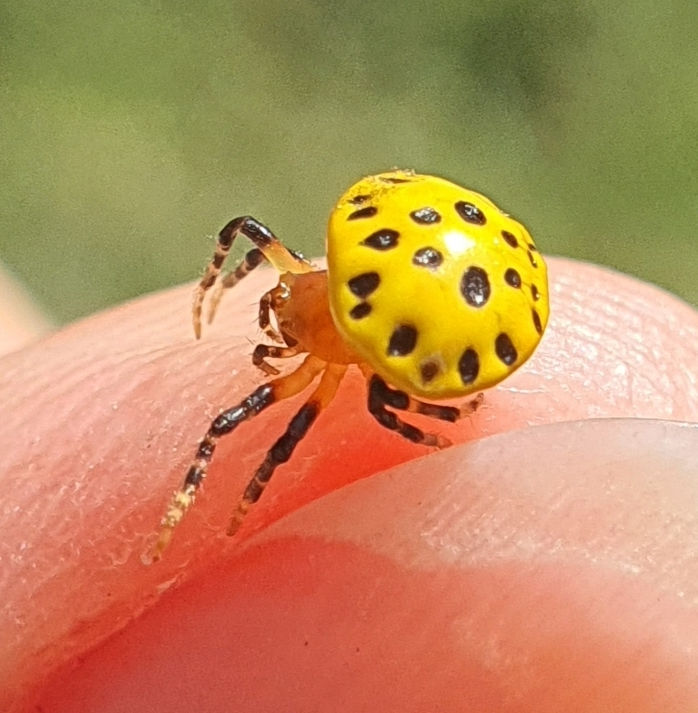

Scientific classification
- Kingdom: Animalia
- Phylum: Arthropoda
- Subphylum: Chelicerata
- Class: Arachnida
- Order: Araneae
- Infraorder: Araneomorphae
- Family: Araneidae
- Genus: Paraplectana
- Species: P. walleri

Binomial name
- Paraplectana walleri (Blackwall, 1865)

= Paraplectana walleri =

Waller's Ladybird Spider

Species of spider

Paraplectana walleri is a species of spider in the family Araneidae. It is commonly known as Waller's ladybird spider and is an African endemic species.

== Distribution ==
Paraplectana walleri is an African endemic described by Blackwall in 1865 as Eurysoma walleri from Mozambique from a region through which the river Shire flows to its confluence with the Zambezi. The species is known West, Central and Southern Africa, and also occurs in Madagascar.

In South Africa, it is recorded from three provinces including Addo Elephant National Park at altitudes ranging from 219 to 1,107 m above sea level. Records include locations in Eastern Cape, Gauteng, KwaZulu-Natal, Mpumalanga, and Western Cape provinces, with specific localities such as Addo Elephant National Park, Pretoria, Greytown Albert Falls, Nelspruit, Badplaas, Sabi Sand Wildtuin adjacent to the Kruger National Park, and Mosselbaai.

== Habitat and ecology ==
The species makes spanning thread orb-webs at night and feeds on moths. It has been sampled from the Grassland and Savanna biomes and has also been found in citrus orchards.

== Conservation ==
Paraplectana walleri is listed as Least Concern by the South African National Biodiversity Institute due to its wide geographical range. The species is protected in three protected areas including Sabi Sand Wildtuin. There are no significant threats to the species.

== Taxonomy ==
The species was originally described by John Blackwall in 1865 as Eurysoma walleri from Mozambique. It has not been revised and is known only from the female.
