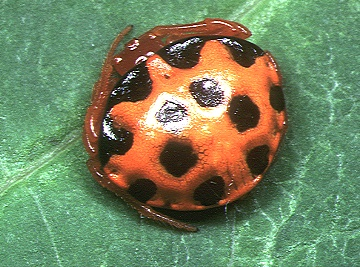

Scientific classification
- Kingdom: Animalia
- Phylum: Arthropoda
- Subphylum: Chelicerata
- Class: Arachnida
- Order: Araneae
- Infraorder: Araneomorphae
- Family: Araneidae
- Genus: Paraplectana
- Species: P. tsushimensis

Binomial name
- Paraplectana tsushimensis Yamaguchi, 1960

= Paraplectana tsushimensis =

Species of spider

Paraplectana tsushimensis is a spider in the orb-weaver family, Araneidae, native to China, Japan, and Taiwan. It is commonly called the ladybird mimic spider.

The species belongs to the genus Paraplectana. The scientific name of the species was first published in 1960 by Yamaguchi.

The ladybird mimic spider has evolved to mimic the appearance of the ladybird. These spiders have bright red or orange bodies with black spots. Their body shape also mimics that of a ladybird, round. To take its mimicry even further, the ladybird mimic spider will move its legs like a ladybird.

The size of the ladybird mimic spider can vary, ranging from a few millimeters to about one centimeter. They use their size to their advantage, easily moving through foliage and hiding.

This spider is known for its patient hunting style. Rather than making webs, the ladybug mimic spider waits on leaves, flowers, or tree bark for its prey to come into its striking range.

Despite its hunting skills, the ladybird spider will also eat nectar. This strategy helps to ensure its survival and provides it with more necessary nutrients for reproduction.

The male ladybird mimic spider has an intricate courtship ritual to attract females during mating season. It uses specific movements and vibrations, a dance of sorts. The female will choose a partner based on the performances.

Like most spiders, the female ladybird mimic spider lays its eggs inside a silk egg sac. Until the eggs hatch, the mother spider wraps herself around the sac, safeguarding it.

The ladybird mimic spider is a primarily solitary species. They will establish their territory, defending it from other spiders, primarily male spiders, who can pose a threat during the mating season.
