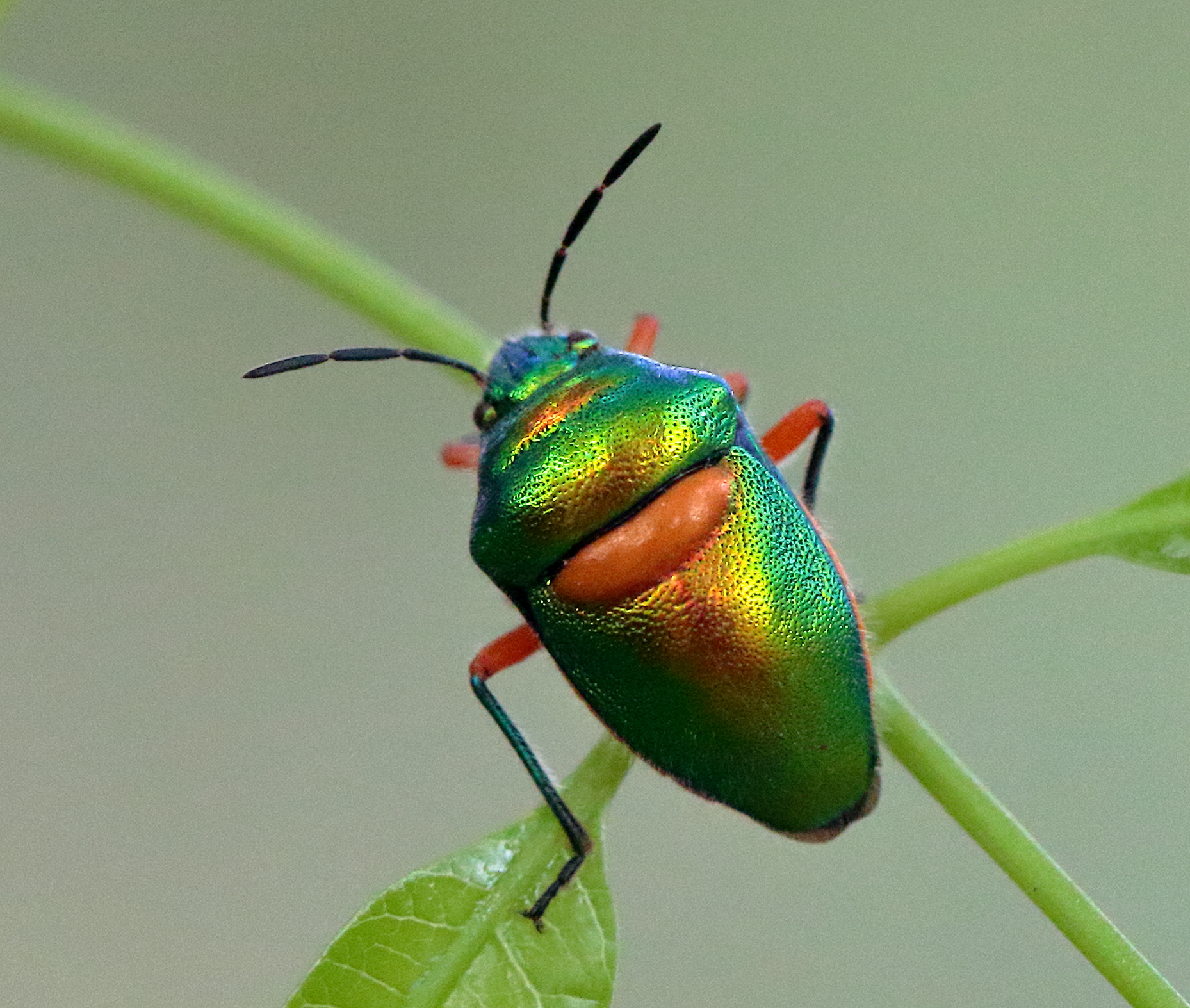
- Lampromicra senator Queensland

Scientific classification
- Kingdom: Animalia
- Phylum: Arthropoda
- Clade: Pancrustacea
- Class: Insecta
- Order: Hemiptera
- Suborder: Heteroptera
- Family: Scutelleridae
- Subfamily: Scutellerinae
- Tribe: Scutellerini
- Genus: Lampromicra; Stål, 1873

Synonyms
- Philia Schiødte, 1842; Schioedtia Kirkaldy, 1905; Schiödtia Kirkaldy, 1905

= Lampromicra =

Genus of true bugs

Lampromicra is a genus of true bugs in the family Scutelleridae. As with other genera in this family, they may be referred-to as "jewel bugs" or "metallic shield bugs".

== Distribution ==
Lampromicra have been recorded in parts of Australia (Queensland, New South Wales, Northern Territory, Western Australia), Papua New Guinea, Indonesia, New Caledonia, Philippines, Moluccas, Solomon Islands.

== Species ==
The following species are recognised in the genus Lampromicra:

- Lampromicra aerea (Distant, 1892)
- Lampromicra caledonica (Distant, 1920)
- Lampromicra elegans (Montrouzier, 1861)
- Lampromicra geminata (Distant, 1920)
- Lampromicra leucocyanea (Montrouzier, 1855)
- Lampromicra miyakona (Matsumura, 1905)
- Lampromicra senator (Fabricius, 1803)
