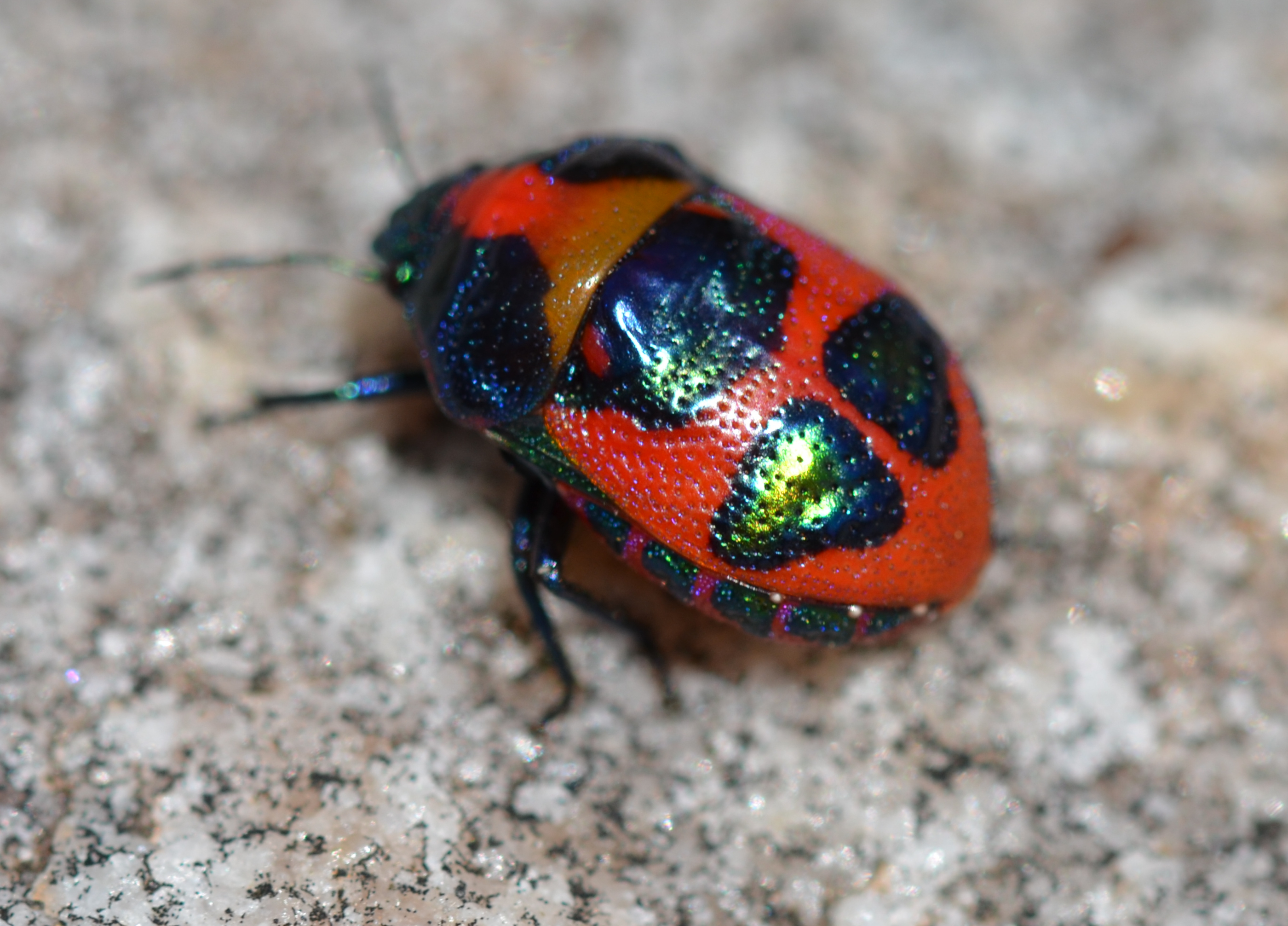
- Choerocoris paganus

Scientific classification
- Domain: Eukaryota
- Kingdom: Animalia
- Phylum: Arthropoda
- Class: Insecta
- Order: Hemiptera
- Suborder: Heteroptera
- Family: Scutelleridae
- Subfamily: Scutellerinae
- Tribe: Scutellerini
- Genus: Choerocoris; Dallas, 1851

= Choerocoris =

Genus of insect

Choerocoris is a genus of Australian true bugs in the family Scutelleridae.

== Species ==
Choerocoris contains the following species:

1. Choerocoris grossi Cassis & Vanags, 2006
2. Choerocoris lattini Cassis & Vanags, 2006
3. Choerocoris paganus (Fabricius, 1775)
4. Choerocoris stalii (Vollenhoven, 1863)
5. Choerocoris variegatus Dallas, 1851
