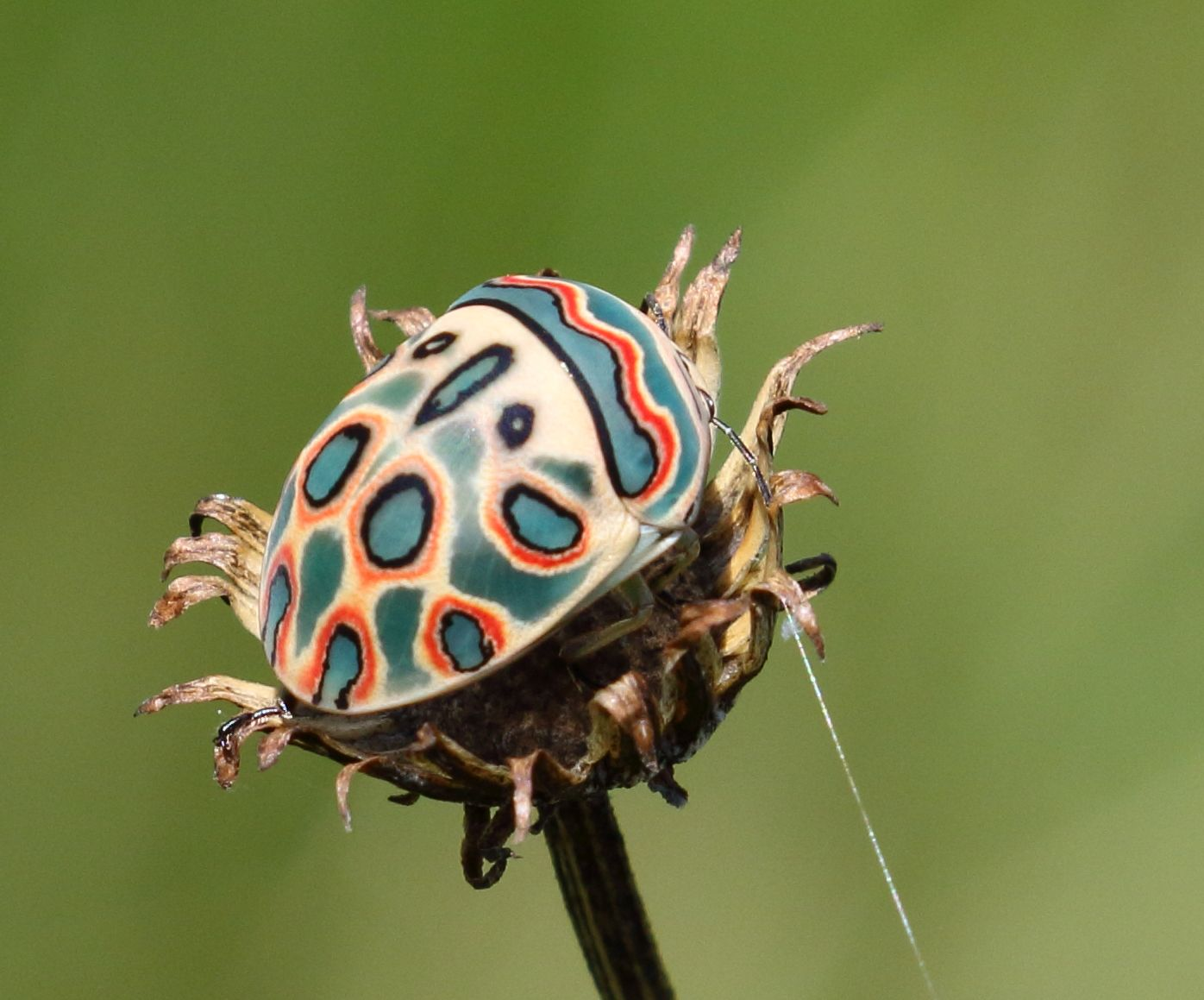

Scientific classification
- Kingdom: Animalia
- Phylum: Arthropoda
- Clade: Pancrustacea
- Class: Insecta
- Order: Hemiptera
- Suborder: Heteroptera
- Family: Scutelleridae
- Genus: Sphaerocoris
- Species: S. annulus

Binomial name
- Sphaerocoris annulus (Fabricius, 1775)

= Sphaerocoris annulus =

Species of true bug

Sphaerocoris annulus, common names Picasso bug or Zulu hud bug (Zulu: "iCikwa"), is a species of shield-backed bugs of the family Scutelleridae. A 'true bug' under the Hemiptera order.

== Description ==
Sphaerocoris annulus can reach a length of about 15 millimetres (0.59 in). The basic color is green, with eleven black-boardered ring-shaped spots on the scutellum, as well as a chevron-centered sinuous marking on the pronotum. The colors and the design of these bugs represent a warning to predators. They also emit a noxious odour when disturbed, as is well known in 'stink bug' relatives. Main host plants are Gossypium species (Malvaceae), Coffea arabica (Rubiaceae), Citrus species (Rutaceae) and Vernonia amygdalina (Asteraceae). This species reproduces at the beginning of the dry season (November–December). Eggs are laid on the underside of leaves, and nymphs will spend a majority of their time in flowers feeding. Once they molt into adults, however, their feeding becomes more generalized. The full development lasts 56 days. Sphaerocoris annulus nymphs are a creamy-white color with black stripes and dots, and gain their colorful spots when they reach maturity.

== Distribution ==
This species is present in tropical and subtropical Africa (Benin, Cameroon, Côte d'Ivoire, Ethiopia, Ghana, Kenya, Malawi, Mozambique, Namibia, Nigeria, Sierra Leone, South Africa, Tanzania, Togo, Zambia and Zimbabwe). Zimbabwe's first listed spotting was in 2017.
