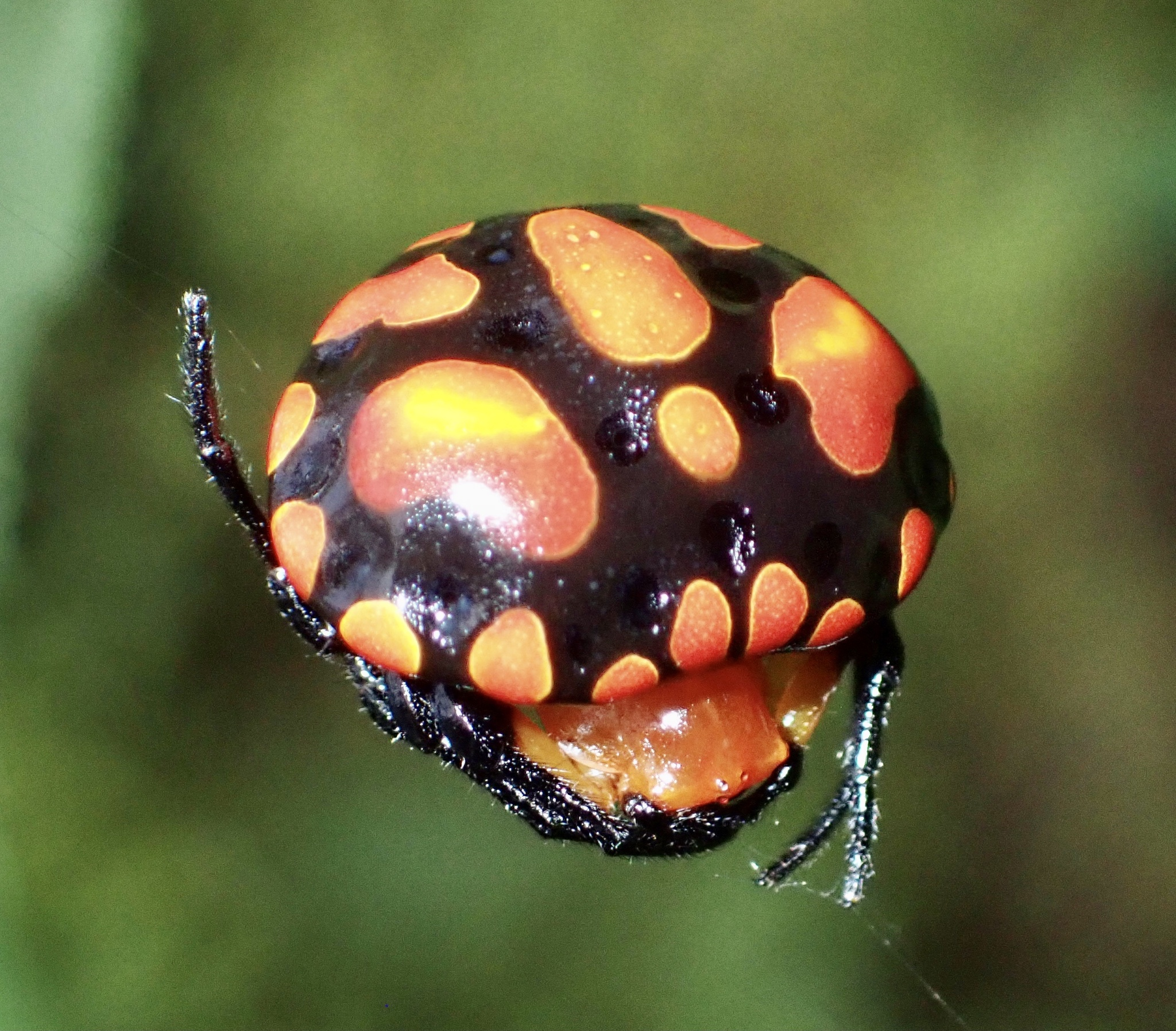

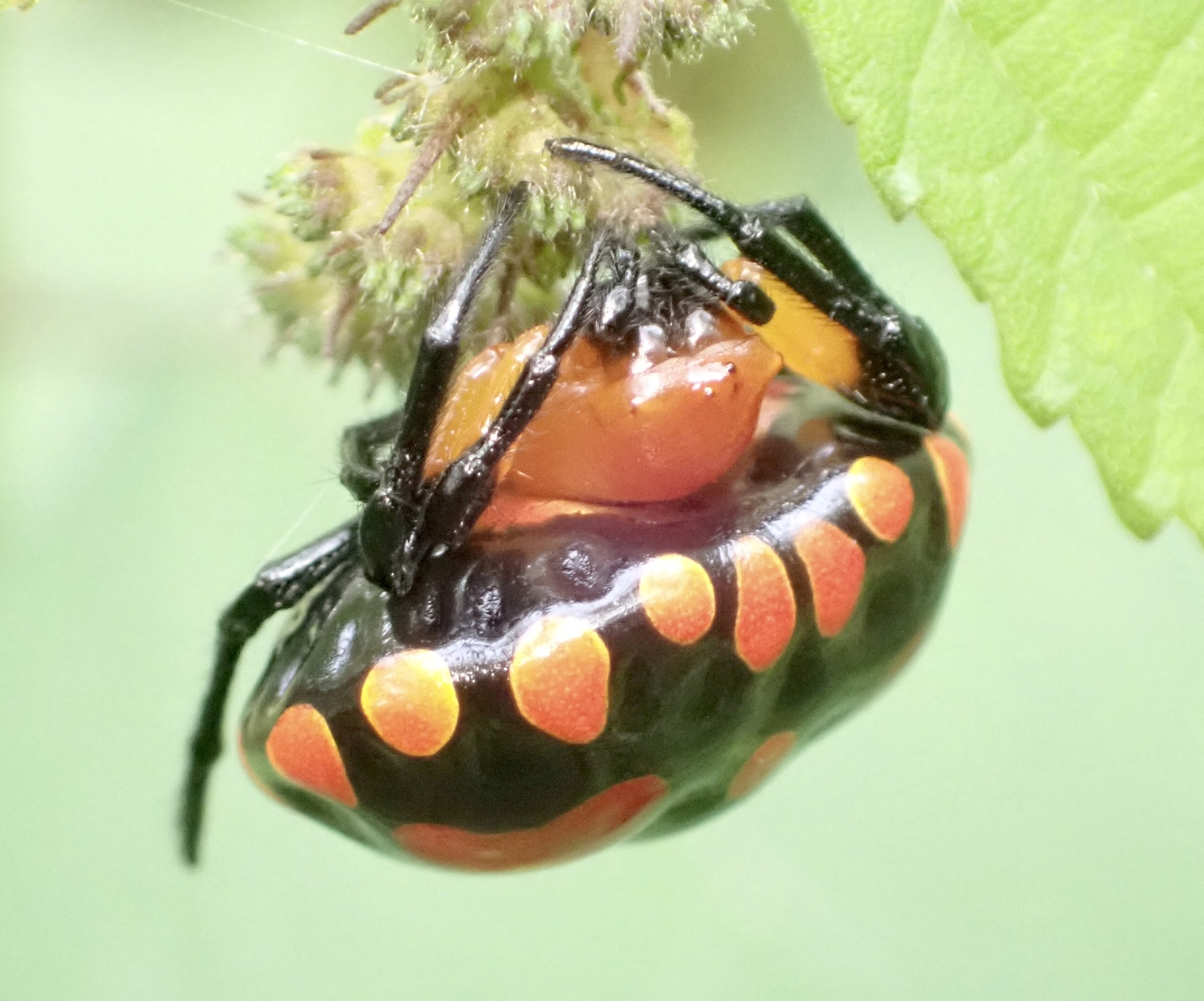

Scientific classification
- Kingdom: Animalia
- Phylum: Arthropoda
- Subphylum: Chelicerata
- Class: Arachnida
- Order: Araneae
- Infraorder: Araneomorphae
- Family: Araneidae
- Genus: Paraplectana
- Species: P. thorntoni

Binomial name
- Paraplectana thorntoni (Blackwall, 1865)

Synonyms
- Paraplectana cabindae Brito Capello, 1867; Paraplectana anchietae Brito Capello, 1867; Peniza testudo Thorell, 1868; Paraplectana thorntoni occidentalis Strand, 1916

= Paraplectana thorntoni =

Thornton's Red Ladybird Spider

Species of spider

Paraplectana thorntoni is a species of spider in the family Araneidae. It is commonly known as Thornton's red ladybird spider and is an African endemic species.

== Distribution ==
Paraplectana thorntoni is an African endemic species originally described in 1865 as Eurysoma thorntoni from Mozambique from a region through which the river Shire flows to its confluence with the Zambezi. The species is known from Mozambique, Ghana, Madagascar, Zimbabwe, Tanzania, South Africa, and Yemen.

In South Africa, the species is rare but recorded from six provinces at altitudes ranging from 49 to 1,303 m above sea level. Records include locations in Eastern Cape, Gauteng, KwaZulu-Natal, Limpopo, Mpumalanga, and Western Cape provinces, with specific localities such as Kentani, Beechamwood, Pretoria, Estcourt, Polokwane, Nelspruit, Garden Route National Park, and Mossel Bay.

== Habitat and ecology ==
P thorntoni is known to build spanning thread orb-webs at night. During the day they rest on vegetation, resembling a ladybird beetle. It is part of a possible mimetic complex involving two tortoise beetles (Chiridopsis suffriani, the "normal" form of C. nigrosepte) as well as ladybird beetles with similarity to Cheilonomes lunata. The species has been found in the Fynbos, Grassland and Savanna biomes.

== Description ==
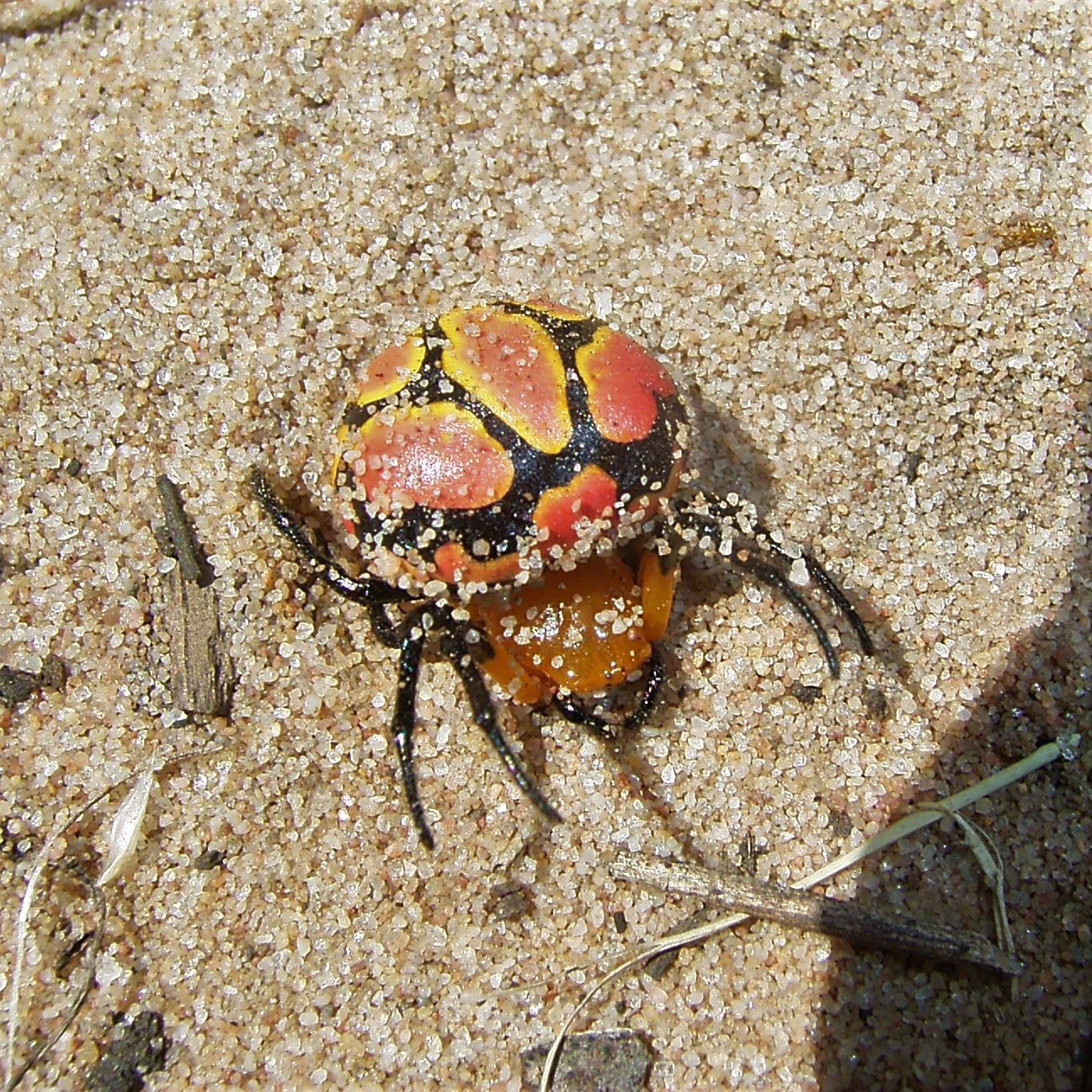
P. thorntoni

== Conservation ==
Paraplectana thorntoni is listed as Least Concern by the South African National Biodiversity Institute due to its wide geographical range. The species is protected in Pongola Nature Reserve and Garden Route National Park. There are no significant threats to the species.

== Taxonomy ==
The species was originally described by John Blackwall in 1865 as Eurysoma thorntoni from Mozambique. It has not been revised and is known only from the female.
