= Procilia =

Scientific classification
- Domain: Eukaryota
- Kingdom: Animalia
- Phylum: Arthropoda
- Class: Insecta
- Order: Hemiptera
- Suborder: Heteroptera
- Family: Scutelleridae
- Subfamily: Scutellerinae
- Tribe: Scutellerini
- Genus: Procilia; Stål, 1865

Genus of shield bugs

Procilia is a genus of African shield bugs in the family Scutelleridae and the tribe Scutellerini described by Carl Stål in 1865.

== Species ==
The following have been included:

1. Procilia holosericea (Dohrn, 1863)
2. Procilia morgani (White, 1839)
3. Procilia nigricornis (Signoret, 1854)
4. Procilia praetoria Stål, 1865
5. Procilia scintillans (Stål, 1864)
