= List of shield bug species of Korea =

This is a list of shield bug species recorded in Korea, including both the Korean Peninsula and adjacent islands.

Species on this list have been:

- included in a standard database of Korean insects, such as that published by the National Institute of Agricultural Science and Technology,
- included in published field guides, or
- reported to be present in Korea in a peer-reviewed scholarly publication.

== Superfamily Pentatomoidea ==
=== Family Acanthosomatidae ===
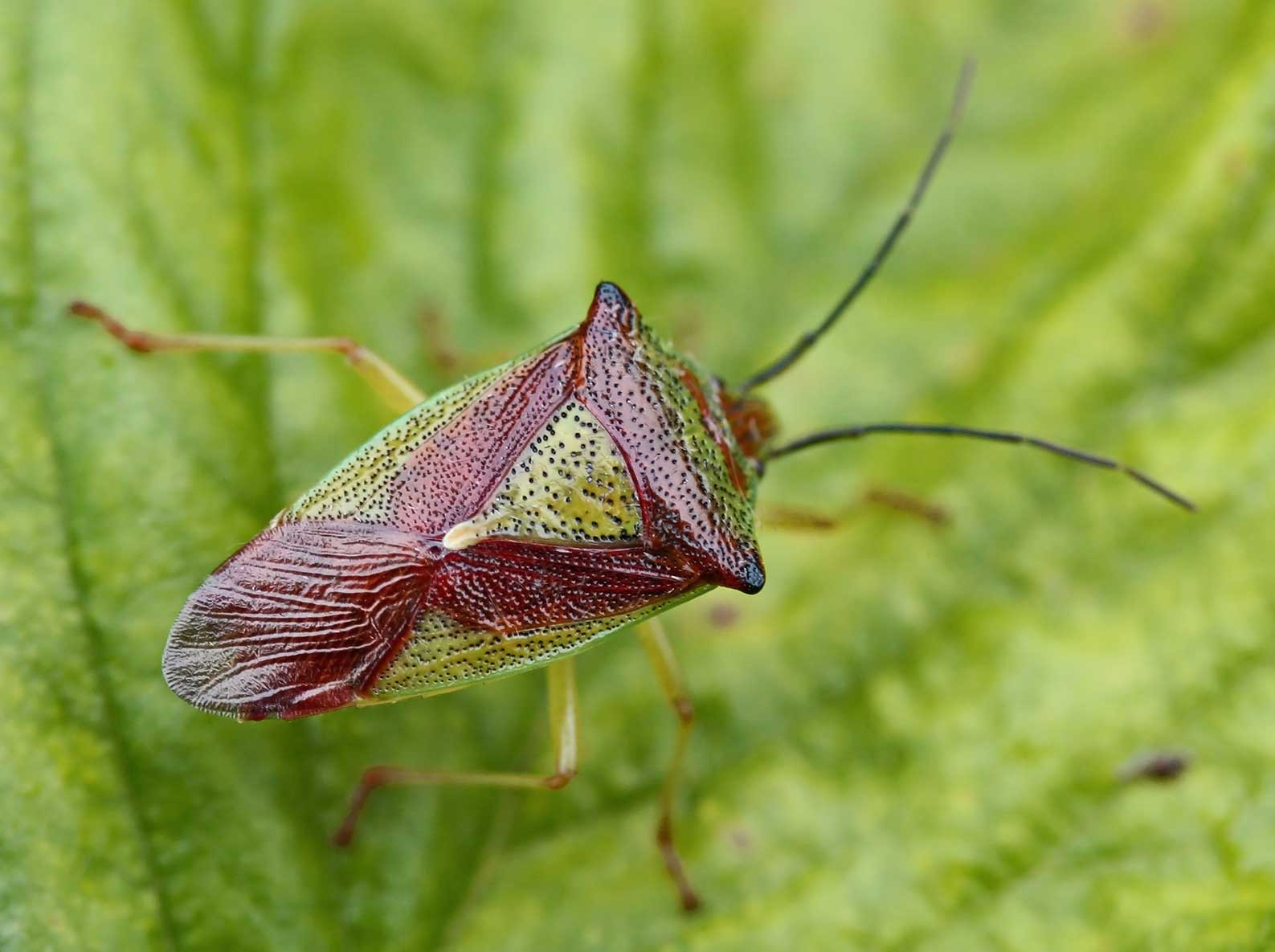
Acanthosoma haemorrhoidale

- Genus Acanthosoma:
  - Acanthosoma crassicaudum (굵은가위뿔노린재, gulgeun-gawippulnorinjae)
  - Acanthosoma denticaudum (등빨간뿔노린재, deungppalganppulnorinjae)
  - Acanthosoma forficula (녹색가위뿔노린재, noksaekgawippulnorinjae)
  - Acanthosoma haemorrhoidale (뿔노린재, ppulnorinjae)
  - Acanthosoma labiduroides (긴가위뿔노린재, gin-gawippul norinjae)
  - Acanthosoma spinicolle (붉은가위뿔노린재, bulgeungawippul norinjae)
- Genus Dichobothrium:
  - Dichobothrium nubilum (남방뿔노린재, nambangppul norinjae)
- Genus Elasmostethus:
  - Elasmostethus humeralis (얼룩뿔노린재, eollukppul norinjae)
- Genus Elasmucha:
  - Elasmucha dorsalis (꼬마뿔노린재, kkomappul norinjae)
  - Elasmucha ferrugata (뾰족침뿔노린재, ppyojokchim norinjae)
  - Elasmucha fieberi (알락꼬마뿔노린재, allakkomappul norinjae)
  - Elasmucha putoni (푸토니뿔노린재, putonippul norinjae)
  - Elasmucha amurensis (극동꼬마뿔노린재, geukdongkkomappul norinjae)
  - Elasmucha signoreti (등검은뿔노린재, deunggeomeunppul norinjae)
- Genus Sastragala:
  - Sastragala scutellata (노랑무늬뿔노린재, norangmunuippul norinjae)
  - Sastragala esakii (에사키뿔노린재, esakippul norinjae)

=== Family Dinidoridae ===
- Genus Megymenum:
  - Megymenum gracilicorne (톱날노린재, tomnal norinjae)

=== Family Scutelleridae ===
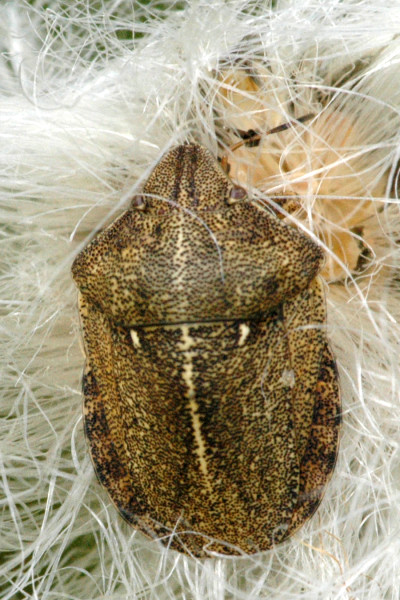
Eurygaster testudinaria

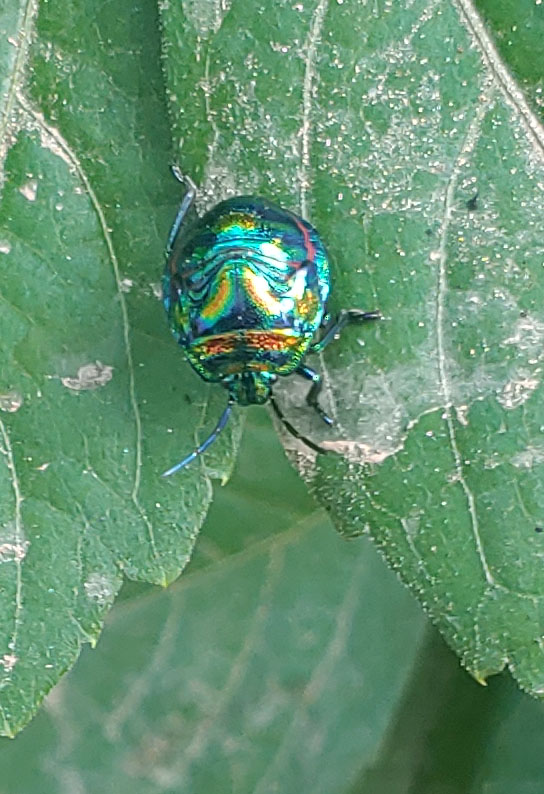
Poecilocoris splendidulus

- Eurygaster testudinaria (도토리노린재, dotorinorinjae)
- Poecilocoris lewisi (광대노린재, gwangdaenorinjae)
- Poecilocoris splendidulus (큰광대노린재, keun-gwangdaenorinjae)

=== Family Cydnidae ===
- Adomerus triguttulus (삼점땅노린재, samjeom ttangnorinjae)
- Adrisa magna (장수땅노린재, jangsu ttangnorinjae)
- Aethus nigrita (둥근땅노린재, dunggeun ttangnorinjae)
- Canthophorus niveimarginatus (흰테두리땅노린재, huinteduri ttangnorinjae)
- Geotomus palliditarsis (북쪽애땅노린재, bukjjok aettangnorinjae)
- Geotomus pygmaeus (애땅노린재, aettangnorinjae)
- Macroscytus japonensis (땅노린재, ttangnorinjae)

=== Family Pentatomidae ===
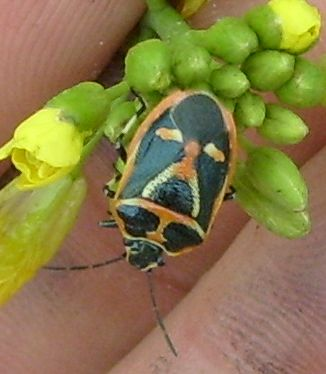
Eurydema gebleri

- Acrocorisellus serraticollis (청동노린재, cheongdong norinjae)
- Aelia fieberi (메추리노린재, mechuri norinjae)
- Antheminia varicornis (나비노린재, nabi norinjae)
- Arma chinensis (중국갈색주둥이노린재, junggukgansaekjudungi norinjae)
- Arma custos (갈색주둥이노린재, galsaekjudungi norinjae)
- Brachynem ishiharai (이시하라노린재, isihara norinjae)
- Carbula humerigera (참가시노린재, chamgasi norinjae)
- Carbula putoni (가시노린재, gasi norinjae)
- Carpocoris purpureipennis (홍보라노린재, hongbo norinjae)
- Carpocoris seidenstueckeri (알락홍보라노린재, allakhongbo norinjae)
- Chlorochroa juniperina (향노린재, hyangnorinjae)
- Dalpada cinctipes (다리무늬두흰점노린재, darimunuiduhuinjeom norinjae)
- Dinorhynchus dybowskyi (왕주둥이노린재, wangjudungi norinjae)
- Dolycoris baccarum - Sloe Bug (알락수염노린재, allaksuyeom norinjae)
- Dybowskyi areticulata (빈대붙이, bindaebuchi)
- Eurydema dominulus (홍비단노린재, hongbidan norinjae)
- Eurydema rugosa (비단노린재, bidan norinjae)
- Eurydema gebleri (북쪽비단노린재, bukjjokbidan norinjae)

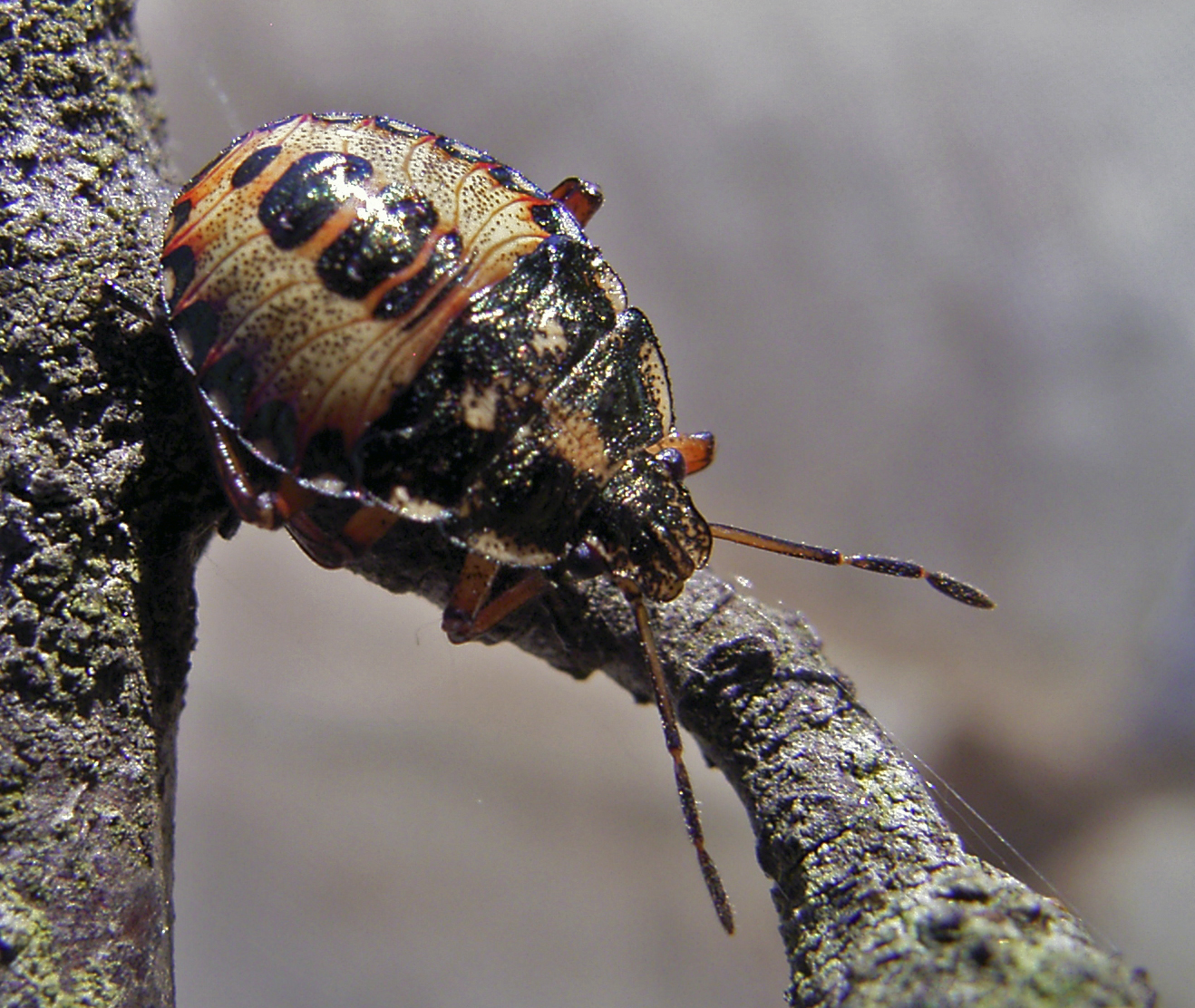
Arma custos

- Eysarcoris annamita (보라흰점둥글노린재, borahuinjeomdunggeul norinjae)
- Eysarcoris lewisi (큰가시둥글노린재 keungasidunggeul norinjae)
- Eysarcoris annamita (보라흰점둥글노린재, borahuinjeomdunggeul norinjae)
- Eysarcoris aeneus (가시점둥글노린재, gasijeomdunggeul norinjae)
- Eysarcoris guttiger (점박이둥글노린재, jeombagidunggeul norinjae)
- Eysarcoris gibbosus (둥글노린재, dunggeul norinjae)
- Glaucias subpunctatus (기름빛풀색노린재, gireumbitpulsaek norinjae)
- Graphosoma rubrolineatum (홍줄노린재, hongjul norinjae)
- Halyomorpha halys (썩덩나무노린재, sseokdeongnamu norinjae)
- Hermolaus amurensis (멋쟁이노린재, meotjaengi norinjae)
- Homalogonia confusa (산느티나무노린재, sanneuchinamu norinjae)
- Homalogonia obtusa (네점박이노린재, nejeombagi norinjae)
- Homalogonia grisea (느티나무노린재, neuchinamu norinjae)
- Laprius gastricus (두점박이노린재, dujeombagi norinjae)
- Lelia decempunctata (열점박이노린재, yeoljeombagi norinjae)
- Menida scotti (스코트노린재, seukoteu norinjae)
- Menida musiva (무시바노린재, musiba norinjae)
- Menida violacea (깜보라노린재, kkambora norinjae)
- Neottiglossa leporina (반디노린재, bandi norinjae)
- Nezara antennata (풀색노린재, pulsaek norinjae)
- Okeanos quelpartensis (제주노린재, jeju norinjae)
- Palomena angulosa (북방풀노린재, bukbangpul norinjae)
- Palomena viridissima (민풀노린재, minpul norinjae)
- Pentatoma japonica (분홍다리노린재, bunhongdari norinjae)
- Pentatoma metallifera (왕노린재, wang norinjae)
- Pentatoma parametallifera (대왕노린재, daewang norinjae)
- Pentatoma rufipes - forest bug (홍다리노린재, hongdari norinjae)
- Pentatoma semiannulata (장흙노린재 )
- Picromerus bidens (알락주둥이노린재 )
- Picromerus lewisi (주둥이노린재 )
- Piezodorus hybneri (가로줄노린재)
- Pinthaeus sanguinipes (홍다리주둥이노린재)
- Placosternum esakii (얼룩대장노린재 )
- Plautia stali (갈색날개노린재 )
- Rubiconia peltata (극동애기노린재 )
- Rubiconia intermedia (애기노린재 )
- Scotinophara horvathi (갈색큰먹노린재 )
- Scotinophara lurida (먹노린재 )
- Scotinophara scotti (꼬마먹노린재 )
- Sepontia aenea (구슬노린재 )
- Troilus luridus (맵시주둥이노린재 )
- Zicrona caerulea (남색주둥이노린재)

=== Family Plataspididae ===
- Genus Coptosoma:
  - Coptosoma capitatum (큰알노린재, keun alnorinjae)
  - Coptosoma bifarium (알노린재, alnorinjae)
  - Coptosoma biguttulum (눈박이알노린재, nunbagi alnorinjae)
  - Coptosoma chinense (중국알노린재, jungguk alnorinjae)
  - Coptosoma japonicum (노랑무늬알노린재, norangmunui alnorinjae)
  - Coptosoma parvipictum (희미무늬알노린재, huimimunui alnorinjae)
- Genus Megacopta:
  - Megacopta punctatissima (무당알노린재, mudang alnorinjae)

=== Family Urostylididae ===
- Genus Urochela:
  - Urochela flavoannulata (무늬배나무노린재, munuibaenamu norinjae)
  - Urochela luteovaria (배나무노린재, baenamu norinjae)
  - Urochela quadrinotata (두쌍무늬노린재, dussangmunui norinjae)
  - Urochela tunglingensis (애두쌍무늬노린재, aedussangmunui norinjae)
- Genus Urostylis, the Oak Bugs:
  - Urostylis westwoodi (참나무노린재, chamnamunorinjae)
  - Urostylis annulicornis (작은주걱참나무노린재, jageunjugeok chamnamnunorinjae)
  - Urostylis lateralis (뒷창참나무노린재, dwitchang chamnamunorinjae)
  - Urostylis striicornis (큰주걱참나무노린재, keunjugeok chamnamunorinjae)
  - Urostylis trullata (갈참나무노린재, gal chamnamunorinjae)

== See also ==
- Shield bug
- Korean Peninsula
