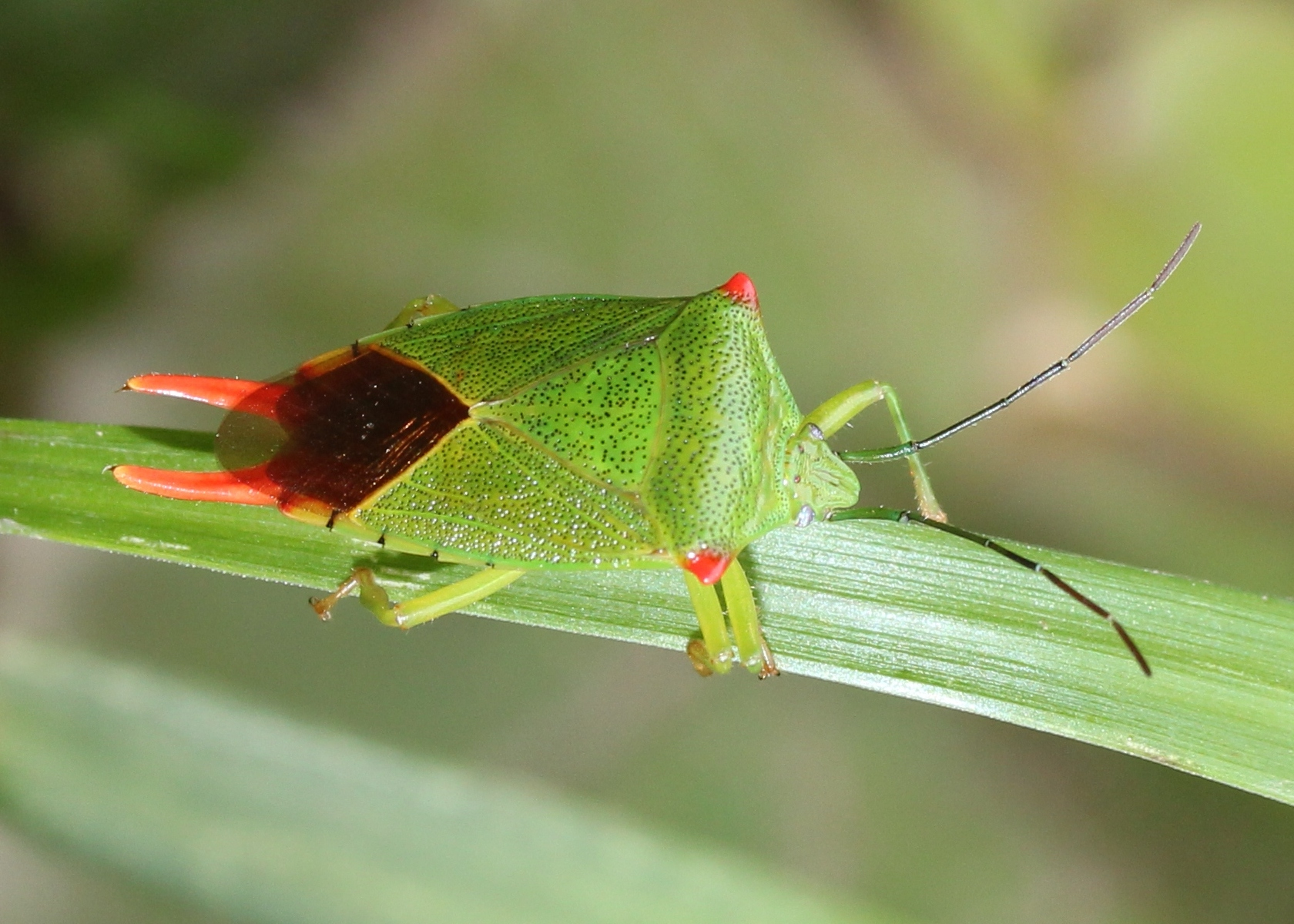
- Male Acanthosoma labiduroides

Scientific classification
- Kingdom: Animalia
- Phylum: Arthropoda
- Clade: Pancrustacea
- Class: Insecta
- Order: Hemiptera
- Suborder: Heteroptera
- Infraorder: Pentatomomorpha
- Superfamily: Pentatomoidea; Leach 1815

Families
- See text

= Pentatomoidea =

Pentatomoidea Temporal range: Early Jurassic – Recent

Superfamily of true bugs

The Pentatomoidea are a superfamily of insects in the suborder Heteroptera of the order Hemiptera. As hemipterans, they possess a common arrangement of sucking mouthparts. The roughly 7000 species under Pentatomoidea are divided into 21 families (16 extant and 5 extinct). Among these are the stink bugs and shield bugs, jewel bugs, giant shield bugs, and burrower bugs.

== Description ==
Anatomy of the dorsal aspect of a shield bug. A: head; B: thorax; C: abdomen. 1: claws; 2: tarsus; 3: tibia; 4: femur; 8: compound eye; 9: antenna; 10: clypeus; 23: laterotergites (connexivum); 25: pronotum; 26: scutellum; 27: clavus; 28: corium; 29: embolium; 30: hemelytral membrane.

The Pentatomoidea are characterised by a well-developed scutellum (the hardened extension of the thorax over the abdomen). It can be triangular to semielliptical in shape. The antennae typically have five segments. The tarsi usually have two or three segments.

Shield bugs have glands that produce a foul-smelling liquid, which is used defensively to deter potential predators. Nymphs have glands on the dorsal surface of the abdomen (dorsal abdominal scent glands). These are often present in adults as well, but adults also develop a pair of glands on the metathorax (third segment of the thorax), these being the metathoracic scent glands.

The nymphs and adults have distinctive piercing mouthparts, with mandibles and maxillae modified to form a piercing stylet sheathed within a modified labium. The stylet is used to suck sap from plants, or in some cases to suck blood from other animals, such as in the predatory subfamily Asopinae.

Pentatomoidea are mostly phytophagous, although some (the Asopinae or predatory stink bugs) are zoophagous. They can become significant pests (e.g. the brown marmorated stink bug), causing economic damage to certain crops.

== Families ==
These families are classified under Pentatomoidea:

=== Extant ===
- Acanthosomatidae Signoret, 1863 – known as shield bugs, contains 46 genera and 184 species found worldwide
- Canopidae McAtee & Malloch, 1928 – found strictly in the Neotropical realm
- Cydnidae Billberg, 1820 – known as burrowing bugs, it contains 120 genera and about 765 species worldwide.
- Dinidoridae Stål, 1867 – found in tropical Asia, Africa, Australia, and South America, composed of 16 genera and about 65 species
- Lestoniidae China, 1955 – small, round bugs that bear a resemblance to tortoise beetles (Chrysomelidae), composed only of one genus and two species, endemic to Australia
- Megarididae McAtee & Malloch, 1928 – contains only one extant genus (Megaris) and 16 species, small, globular bugs occurring in Central America
- Parastrachiidae Oshanin, 1922 – bright red and black bugs exhibiting maternal care of eggs, it contains only two genera: Dismegistus (Africa) and Parastrachia (Eastern Asia).
- Pentatomidae Leach, 1815 – known as stink bugs, it is the largest family in Pentatomoidea. It contains around 900 genera and over 4700 species.
- Phloeidae – large mottled brown and flattened bugs found strictly in the Neotropical realm. It is composed on only 2 genera and 3 species. They are known to exhibit strong maternal care.
- Plataspidae – found in Asia, particularly eastern Asia, although a few species of Coptosoma occur in the Palearctic. They are round plant-feeding bugs. It has about 59 genera and 560 species.
- Saileriolidae – only recently removed from inclusion within Urostylididae.
- Scutelleridae – known as jewel bugs or shield-backed bugs. Composed of 81 genera and about 450 species.
- Tessaratomidae – known as giant shield bugs because they are usually relatively large. Has about 55 genera and 240 species worldwide (mainly in the Old World tropics).
- Thaumastellidae – small bugs usually found under rocks in tropical Africa and the Middle East. It contains only one genus and three species. There is some debate to their inclusion within Pentatomoidea.
- Thyreocoridae Amyot & Serville, 1843 – includes the former family, subfamily Corimelaeninae Uhler, 1872 – known as ebony bugs, they are small, oval, shiny black bugs.
- Urostylididae – contains about 11 genera and 170 species. They are found in Southern and Eastern Asia.

=== Extinct ===
- †Kobdocoridae (=Venicoridae) Popov 1986 Early Cretaceous, Asia
- †Mesopentacoridae Popov 1968 Middle Jurassic-Early Cretaceous, Asia
- †Primipentatomidae Yao et al. 2013 Early Cretaceous, China
- †Probascanionidae Handlirsch 1921 Early Jurassic, Germany
- †Protocoridae Handlirsch 1906 Early-Middle Jurassic, Eurasia

== Phylogeny ==
The morphological unweighted tree of Pentatomoidea after Grazia et al. (2008).

- ←
  - Urostylididae
  - - Saileriolidae
    - - Acanthosomatidae
      - - - Tessaratomidae
          - Dinidoridae
          - Cydnidaesensu lato
            - Cydnidae
            - Thaumastellidae
            - Parastrachiidae
          - - Thyreocoridae
            - Lestoniidae
            - Phloeidae
            - - Scutelleridae
              - Plataspidae
            - Pentatomidae
            - Canopidae
            - Megarididae

== Gallery ==
Example species of the families under Pentatomoidea
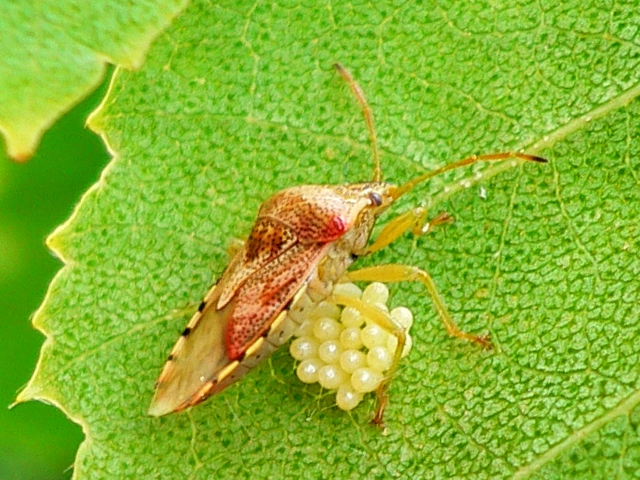
Acanthosomatidae: The parent bug (Elasmucha grisea) guarding eggs

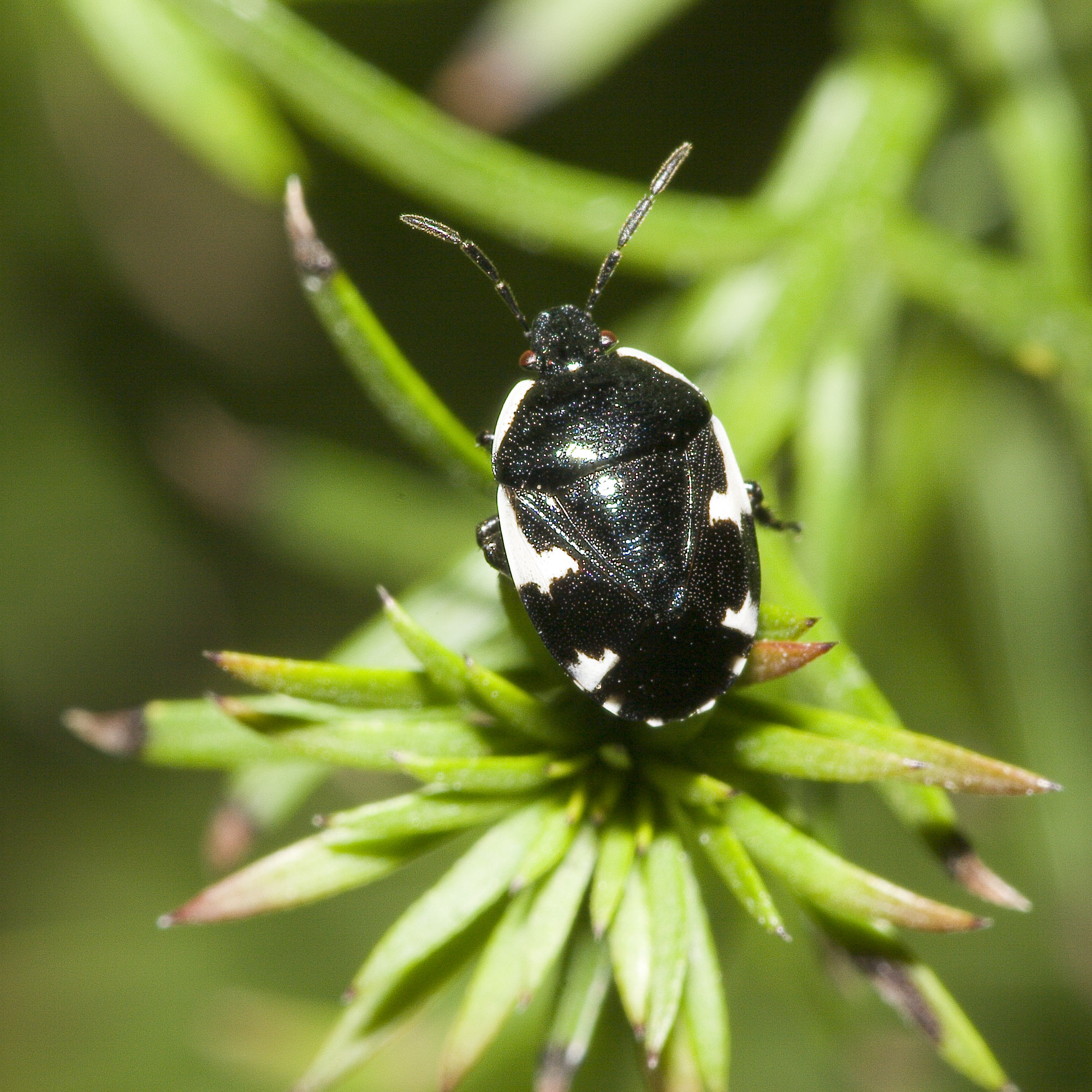
Cydnidae: Tritomegas sexmaculatus

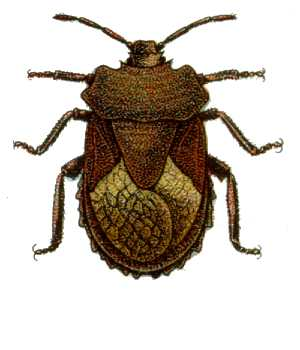
Dinidoridae: Megymenum affine

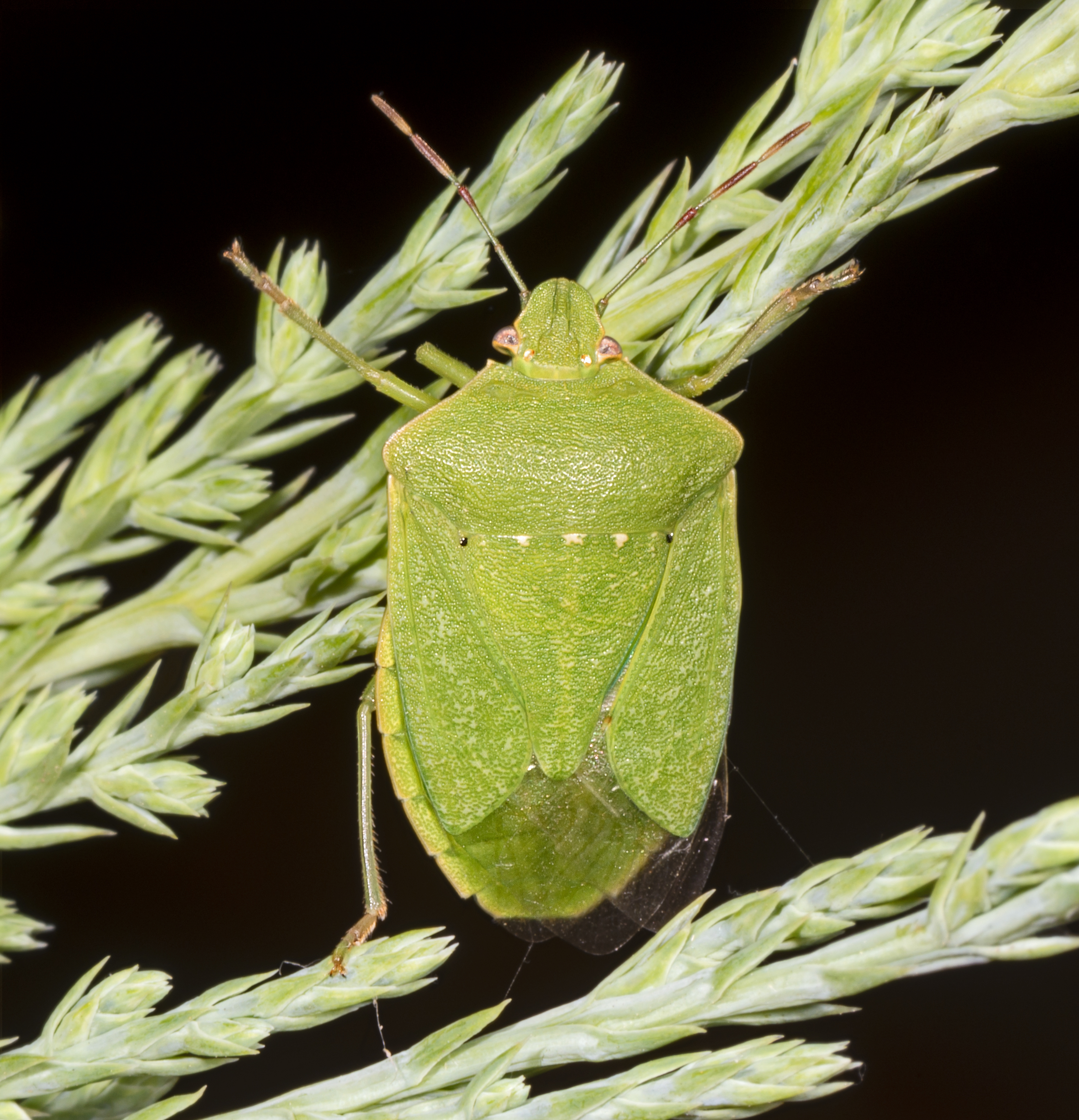
Pentatomidae: The southern green stink bug (Nezara viridula)

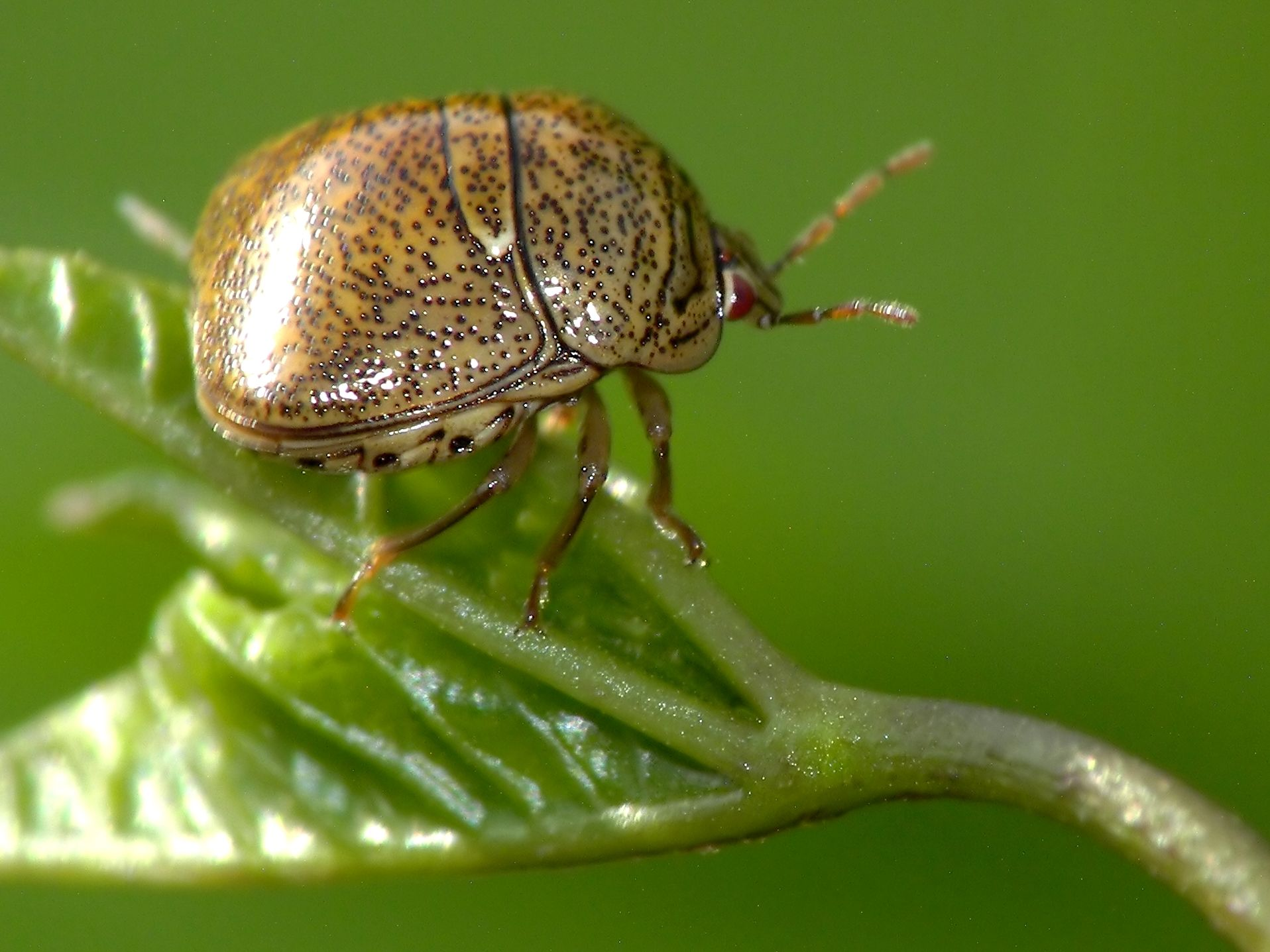
Plataspidae: Megacopta cribraria

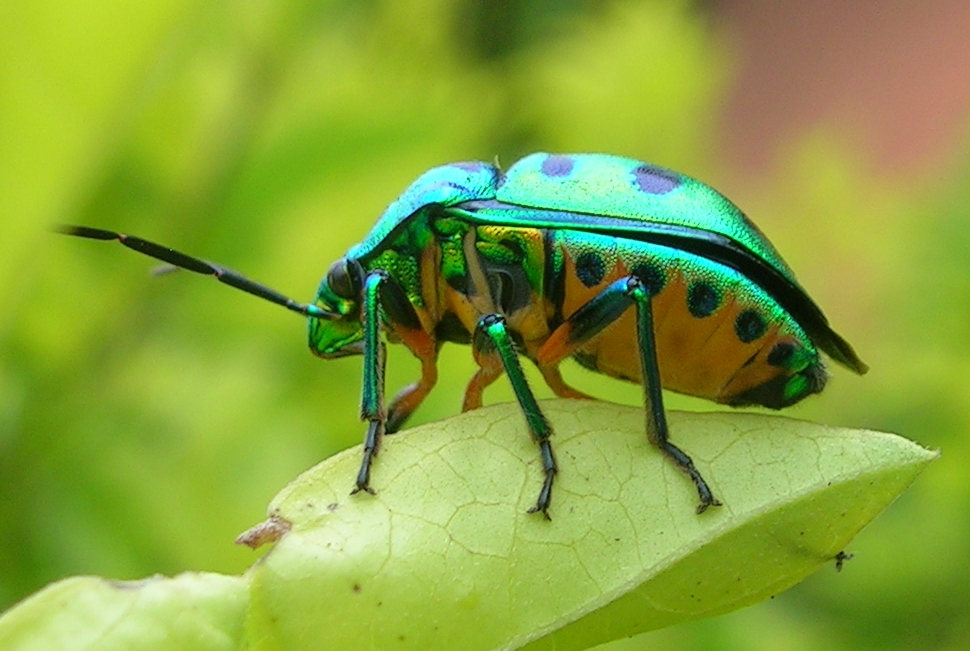
Scutelleridae: The lychee shield bug, Chrysocoris stolli, a jewel bug

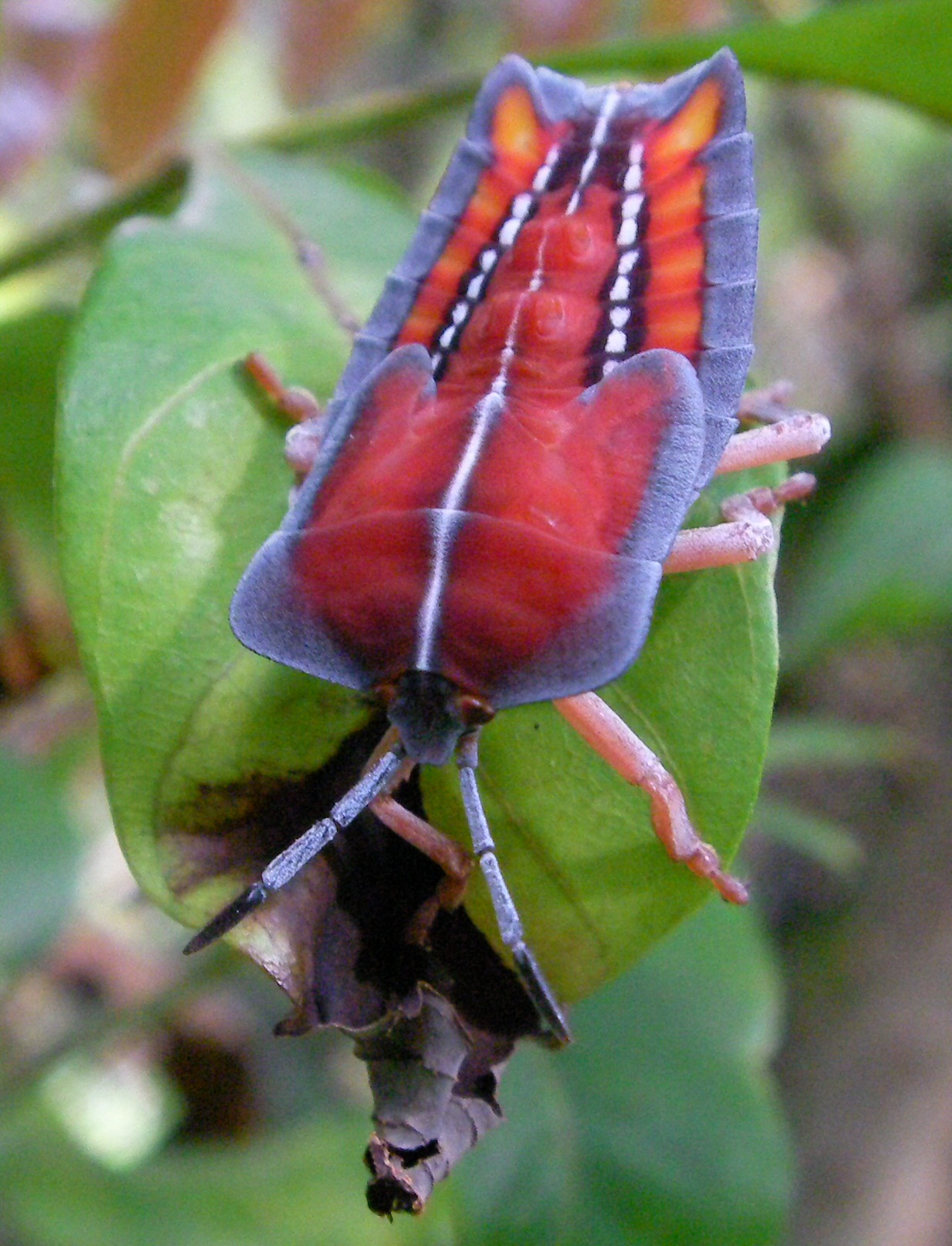
Tessaratomidae: Tessaratoma papillosa nymph

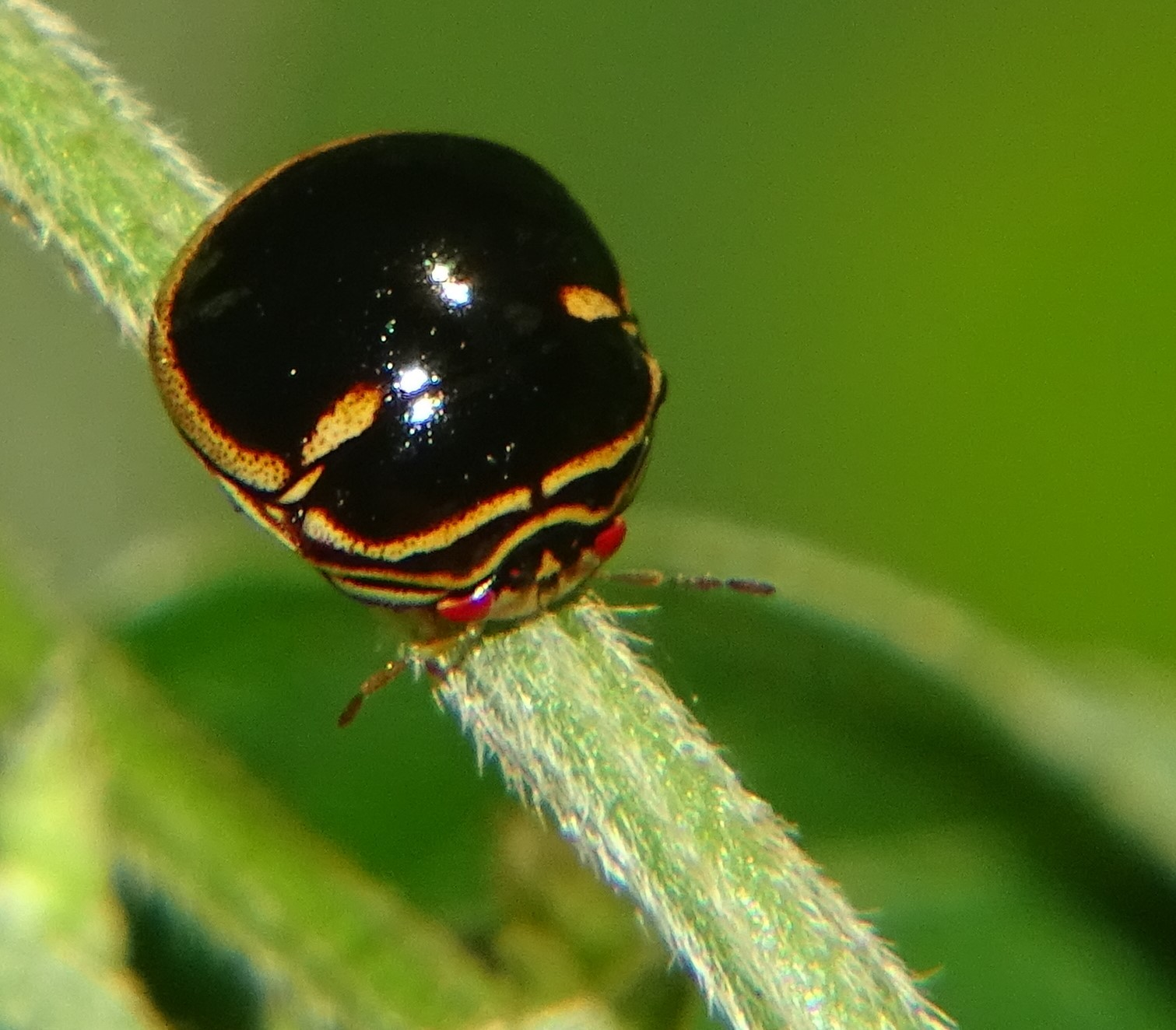
Plataspidae: Coptosoma xanthogramma, black stink bug

== See also ==
- List of shield bug species of Korea
- Pentatomomorpha
- Sunn pest
