= Megarididae =

Scientific classification
- Kingdom: Animalia
- Phylum: Arthropoda
- Clade: Pancrustacea
- Class: Insecta
- Order: Hemiptera
- Suborder: Heteroptera
- Superfamily: Pentatomoidea
- Family: Megarididae; McAtee & Malloch, 1928

Family of true bugs

Megarididae is a family of true bugs in the superfamily Pentatomoidea. The family consists of a single extant genus Megaris with about 16 species restricted to the Neotropical Realm and a fossil is known from Dominican amber.

Bugs in this family are small (< 5 mm long) and are beetle-like, convex and shiny. The family can be identified by an enlarged scutellum that covers the abdomen and wings entirely and the legs have two tarsal segments. The extant genus Megaris has the second tarsal segment much smaller than the first. The ocelli are ovoid-elliptical and the eyes are constricted. The antennae are four-segmented. They are smaller than the somewhat similar members of the Canopidae which have however slightly larger, have three tarsal segments, and have the lateral pronotal margins meeting in a rounded arc. A fossil species from 20 to 15 mya amber has been described as Minysporops dominicanus.

== Distribution ==
This family is restricted to the Neotropical zone, including the fossil species found in amber from the Dominican Republic. Some are endemic to restricted areas, such as M. majusculus, which is found only in Cuba.
