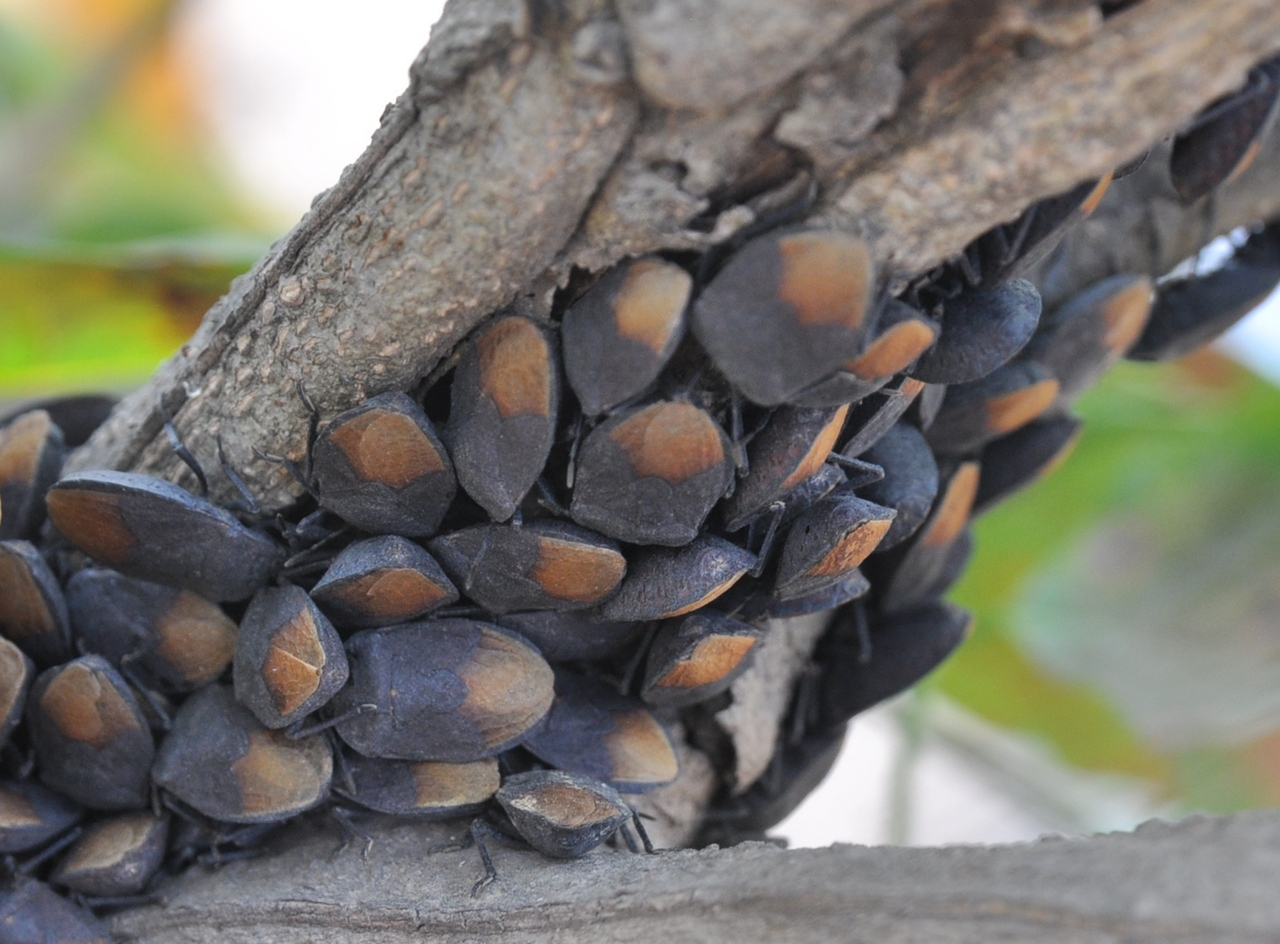
- An aggregation

Scientific classification
- Kingdom: Animalia
- Phylum: Arthropoda
- Clade: Pancrustacea
- Class: Insecta
- Order: Hemiptera
- Suborder: Heteroptera
- Family: Dinidoridae
- Subfamily: Dinidorinae
- Genus: Cyclopelta
- Species: C. siccifolia

Binomial name
- Cyclopelta siccifolia (Westwood, 1837)

Synonyms
- Aspongopus siccifolia

= Cyclopelta siccifolia =

Species of true bug

Cyclopelta siccifolia is a bug in the family Dinidoridae, found in South Asia. It is known for its large aggregations on certain species of plants. They have been known to aggregate and damage Erythrina, Sesbania, Pongamia, and Cajanus cajan.

The species has underside paler than upper parts, the scutellum has a small yellow spot and the membrane of the wing is much lighter than the rest of the wing. The most similar species is Cyclopelta obscura. Aggregations of the bug have been noted on Sesbania, Butea, Milletia among others. Where they risk damage to the plants, the recommended practice is to handpick the bugs since they are quite sluggish.
