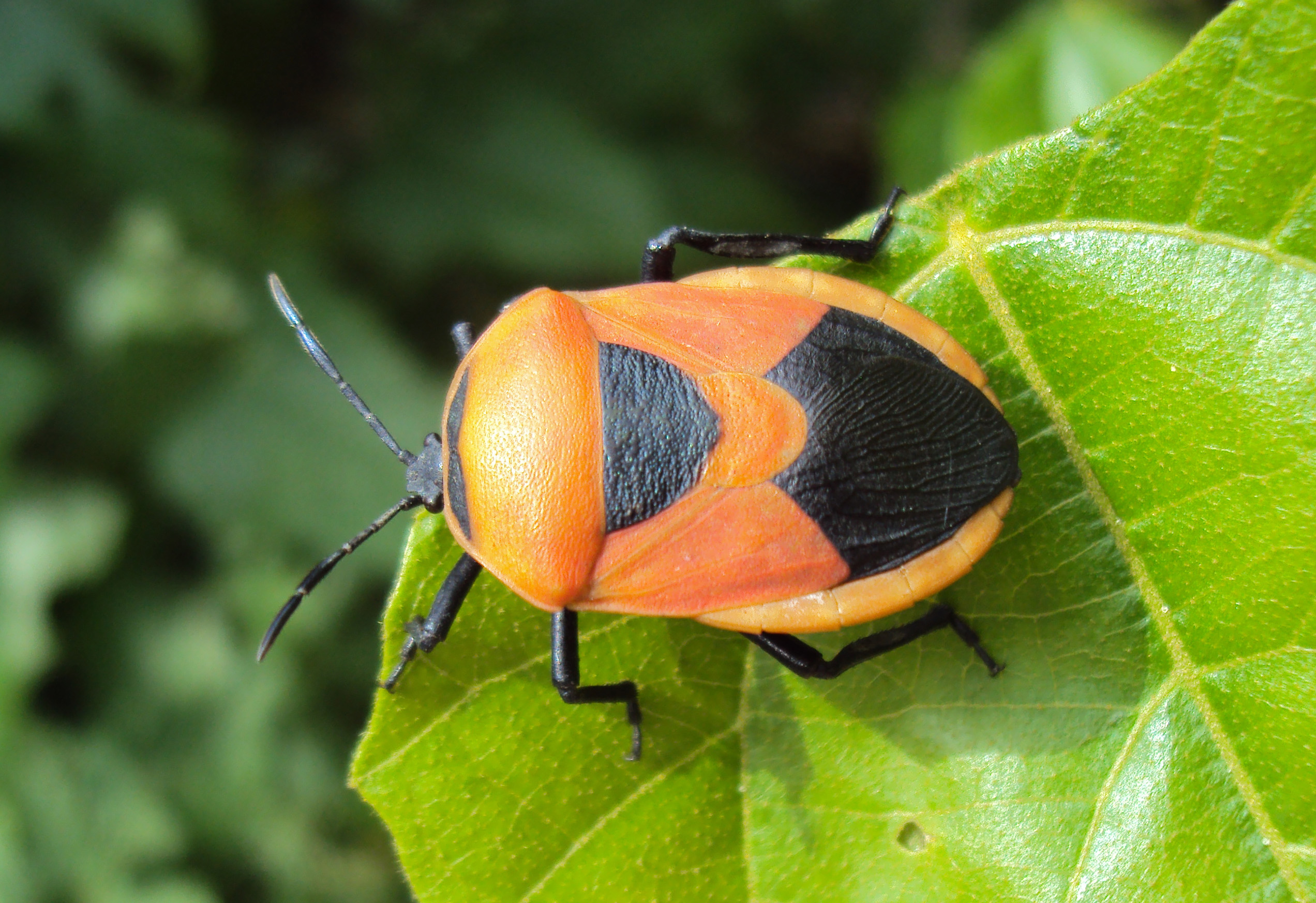

Scientific classification
- Kingdom: Animalia
- Phylum: Arthropoda
- Class: Insecta
- Order: Hemiptera
- Suborder: Heteroptera
- Family: Dinidoridae
- Genus: Coridius
- Species: C. ianus

Binomial name
- Coridius ianus (Fabricius, 1775)

Synonyms
- Cimex ianus Fabricius, 1775; Cimex janus [sic] Fabricius, 1775; Edessa ianus (Fabricius, 1775); Cimex surinamensis Goeze, 1778; Cimex afer Drury, 1782; Pentatoma janus [sic] (Fabricius, 1775); Aspongopus janus [sic] (Fabricius, 1775); Aspongopus vicinus Westwood, 1837

= Coridius ianus =

Species of true bug

Coridius ianus, sometimes known as the red pumpkin bug, is a species of bug in the family Dinidoridae. It feeds by sucking on the sap on soft parts of plants, especially in the cucurbit family, and causes damage to crops.

== Taxonomy ==
This species was originally described in the genus Cimex by Fabricius, who later transferred the genus to Edessa in 1803. It was later placed in the genus Pentatoma by Lepeletier and Serville in 1825 and then the genus Aspongopusby Laporte in 1833. The species was finally transferred to Coridius by Schumacher in 1924.

Subsequent authors, beginning with Fuessly in 1778, subsequently spelled the epithet as "janus." Such subsequent spellings that differ from the original publication, however, are unavailable names under ICZN Article 33.3. Thus, ianus is retained as the accepted spelling.

== Description and identification ==
The antenna is five segmented with the third segment longer than the first which is shorter than all other segments, the body outline is oval. The scutellum is short and has a rounded apex. The proboscis tip extends past the coxae of the first pair of legs. They are yellowish to orange red in colour with a black stripe on the anterior pronotal edge sometimes broke in the middle. The basal half of the scutellum and the membrane of the forewing is also black.

== Distribution ==
The species is widely distributed in tropical South and Southeast Asia but has spread to other parts of the world.

== Biochemistry ==
Coridius ianus has been used in numerous physiological and anatomic studies that have demonstrated their strong cibarial muscles used for sucking sap. Like other bugs they produce defensive chemicals from metathoracic scent glands opening ventrally at the base of the third coxae. They produce chemicals that include 4,5-dimethyl diazole, (E)-2-hexenyl acetate, O-iso butenyl phenol, undecane, undecylamine, 1,12-Dodecan-diol and N-methyl dodec-6,10 diene amine. These chemicals are known to repel ants (Anoplolepis longipes) and beetles and the effectiveness of a mixture of the key compounds trans-2-hexenal; n-tridecane (60:40 by weight) was greater than with comparative alkanes of shorter or longer lengths.
