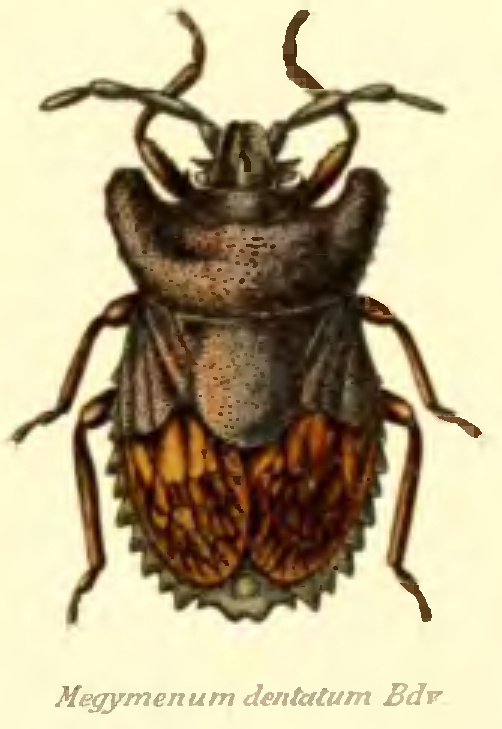
- Megymenum dentatum

Scientific classification
- Kingdom: Animalia
- Phylum: Arthropoda
- Clade: Pancrustacea
- Class: Insecta
- Order: Hemiptera
- Suborder: Heteroptera
- Family: Dinidoridae
- Subfamily: Megymeninae
- Genus: Megymenum; Guérin-Méneville, 1831

Synonyms
- Amaurus Burmeister, 1834; Anoplocephala Stål, 1870; Megalymenum Burmeister, 1835; Pissistes Stål, 1870; Platydius Westwood, 1835; Pseudaradus Burmeister, 1834

= Megymenum =

Genus of true bugs

Megymenum is a genus of Asian and Australian shield bugs in the family Dinidoridae and typical of the subfamily Megymeninae. It was erected by Félix Édouard Guérin-Méneville in 1831 and species have been recorded from India through to Japan, Indochina, Malesia, New Guinea and Australia.

== Description ==
Species in genus Megymenum have extended or greatly expanded pronotal margins (as in the type species M. dentatum) with a rounded scutellum: characteristic of the Dinidoridae. In most species the second valvifers are reduced, lightly sclerotised, and fused in the middle. Some species have reduced hemelytra and are flightless. Female Megymenum gracilicorne has distinctive sexual dimorphism in the hind legs, and females have a broadened part on the inner hind tibia which was thought to be a tympanal organ (with the ability to hear sound), but in 2025 it was discovered that this organ has a layer of secretory cells and the cavity contains special fungi. These fungi, mostly in the family Cordycipitaceae, are transferred to eggs at the time of oviposition and the fungus is thought to provide protection to the eggs against parasitic wasps.

== Species ==
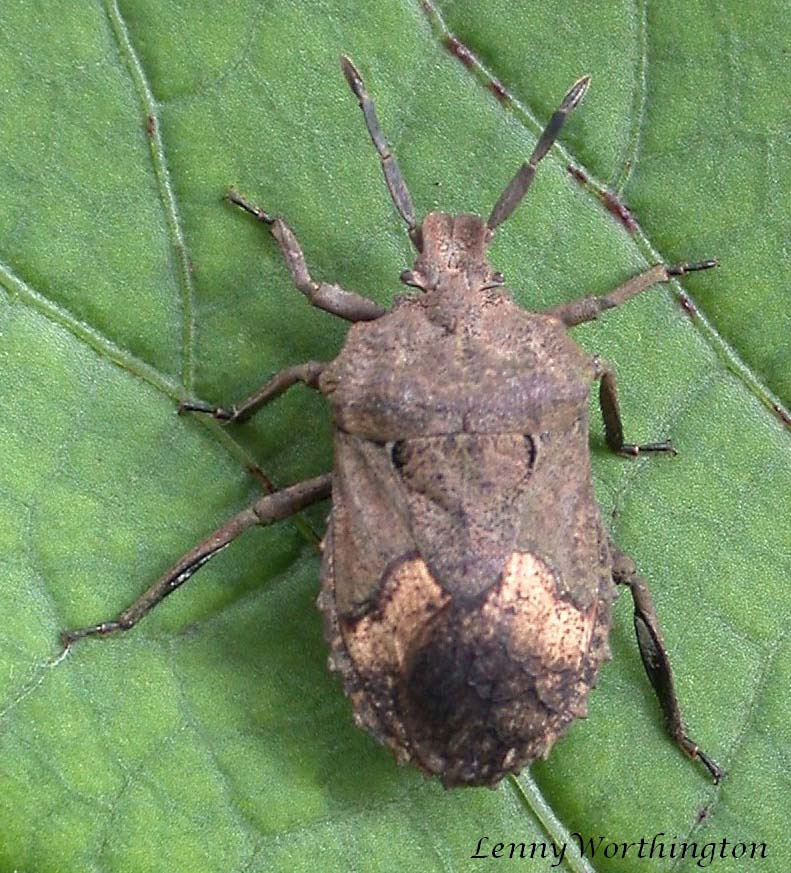
Megymenum brevicorne

The following species are currently (as of July 2024) accepted in the genus:

1. Megymenum affine Boisduval, 1835
2. Megymenum anacanthum Vollenhoven, 1868
3. Megymenum aruense Kocorek & Danielczok, 2002
4. Megymenum basale Walker, 1868
5. Megymenum brevicorne (Fabricius, 1787)
6. Megymenum confusum Kocorek & J.Lis, 2000
7. Megymenum dentatum Guérin-Méneville, 1831 – type species
8. Megymenum distanti Kocorek & Ghate, 2012
9. Megymenum dohrni J.Lis, 1990
10. Megymenum gracilicorne Dallas, 1851
11. Megymenum lisi Kocorek, 2000
12. Megymenum megaspinosum Kocorek, 2000
13. Megymenum mekongum Distant, 1921
14. Megymenum obliquum Schouteden, 1913
15. Megymenum parallelum Vollenhoven, 1868
16. Megymenum pratti Distant, 1911
17. Megymenum quadratum Vollenhoven, 1868
18. Megymenum rectangulatum Breddin, 1901
19. Megymenum salebrosum J.Lis, 1992
20. Megymenum semivestitum Vollenhoven, 1868
21. Megymenum severini Bergroth, 1892
22. Megymenum spinosum (Burmeister, 1834)
23. Megymenum sumatranum Kocorek & J.Lis, 2008
24. Megymenum tuberculatum Hemala, Kocorek & Lis, 2020
