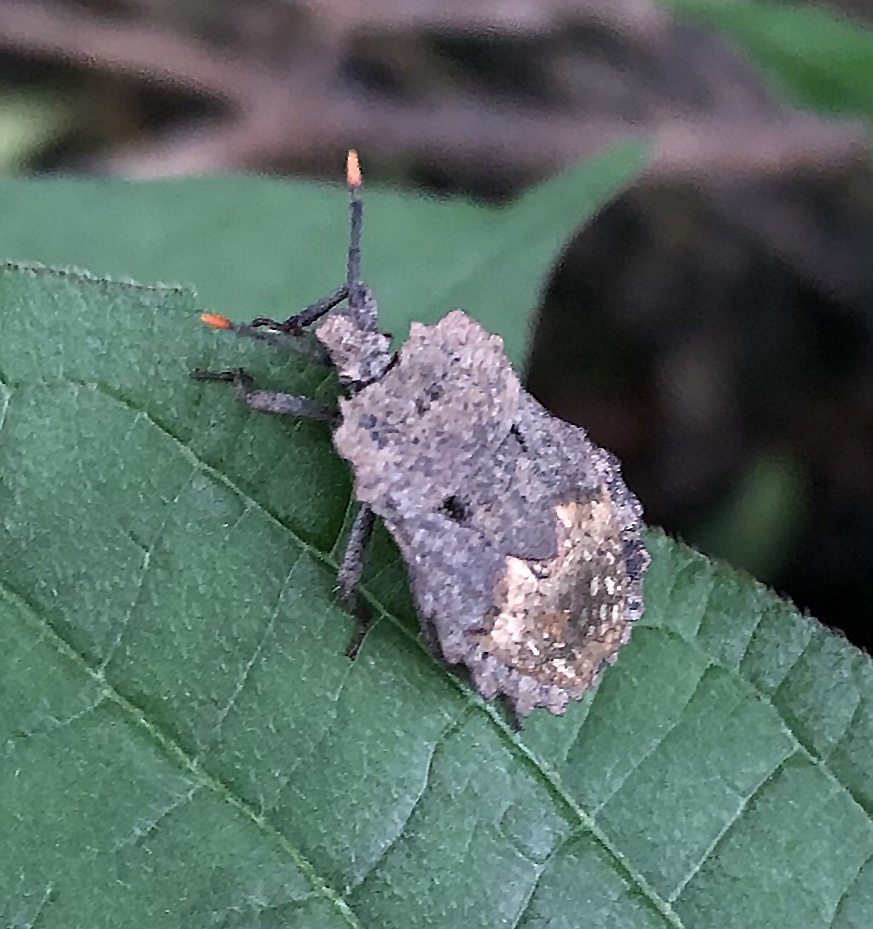

Scientific classification
- Kingdom: Animalia
- Phylum: Arthropoda
- Clade: Pancrustacea
- Class: Insecta
- Order: Hemiptera
- Suborder: Heteroptera
- Family: Dinidoridae
- Genus: Megymenum
- Species: M. gracilicorne

Binomial name
- Megymenum gracilicorne Dallas, 1851

= Drab stinkbug =

Insect species

The drab stinkbug (or saw-toothed stinkbug), Megymenum gracilicorne, is an insect in the family Dinidoridae. The species is found in East Asia and eats plants including cucurbits. It has the distinctive behavior of cultivating fungus on females' hind legs, which is used to protect their eggs from parasitic wasps. According to entomologist John Noyes, "this is a unique system, as far as I'm aware".

== Classification ==
The family Dinidoridae is subdivided into two subfamilies: the Dinidorinae, and the Megymeninae, with the genus Megymenum in the latter. The Megymeninae have rough dorsal surfaces, unlike the smooth surfaces of the Dinidorinae, along with a linear arrangement of the spiracles (openings for air exchange) on their abdomens, and their trichobothria (hair-like sensory structures) are paired. A cladistic analysis places Megymenum pratti as M. gracilicorne's closest relative, with M. mekongum as the next closest. M. tauriformis is now considered to be identical to M. gracilicorne.

== Geographic distribution and plant hosts ==
M. gracilicorne is found in Japan, Korea, China, Taiwan, and Hong Kong. It feeds on plants including the Cucurbitaceae, such as pumpkins and cucumbers, as well as other kinds of crop plants, including grapes and potatoes.

== Parasitism by wasps ==
Drab stinkbugs are vulnerable to attack by parasitoid wasps of the species Trissolcus brevinotaulus. The wasps insert their eggs into the eggs of the stinkbugs. When the wasp eggs hatch, the larvae feed on the stinkbug eggs from within, killing the stinkbug eggs, after which the wasps hatch.

== Symbiotic relationships ==
=== Digestive tract ===
Along with various other stinkbugs, the drab stinkbug has evolved a specially constricted passage in its intestine, that separates the parts in front of the constriction from a posterior portion of the midgut, which beneficial symbiotic bacteria can reach by using their flagella, and colonize. In drab stinkbugs, these bacteria are gammaproteobacteria mostly of the genus Pantoea. Unlike most other stinkbugs, who characteristically transmit symbiotic bacteria from mothers to offspring, each generation of M. gracilicorne obtains these bacteria from the environment. The bacteria may be pathogens for some plants that the stinkbugs feed on, but are ectosymbionts that provide the stinkbugs with protection against predators and pathogens of their own. First-instar M. gracilicorne raised in a laboratory without gut bacteria fail to grow, indicating that the bacteria are necessary for the insect's development.

=== Fungal defense ===
Drab stinkbugs possess a distinctive structure on their hind legs, that was previously misidentified as a tympanal organ used for detecting sound. However, this structure, which is present only in females, was found in 2025 to instead be a grouping of up to 2,000 mycangia, small pores in which fungus can grow. The fungi carried by female drab stinkbugs have been identified as members of the genera Cordyceps and Simplicillium. It is as yet unknown how the stinkbugs collect only these types of fungus, without contamination by others. These fungi are not harmful to the stinkbugs.

When the female drab stinkbug lays her eggs, she uses one hind leg to scrape some fungus from the other hind leg, alternating between legs, and then applies the fungus to each egg as it is laid. The fungus obtains nutrition from carbohydrates on the egg's surface, without harming the egg itself. Over the next three days, the fungus grows a network of hyphae covering the egg mass, about 2 mm thick. When a parasitoid wasp approaches eggs that are covered by the fungus, the fungus prevents the wasp from harming the eggs about 90% of the time. This protection appears to be a physical barrier, rather than a chemical repellent. Entomologists including John Noyes observed when these findings were published that such a use of fungus by an insect has not been reported before. When the eggs hatch, some of the fungus remains on the stinkbug nymphs, but it is shed when they molt.
