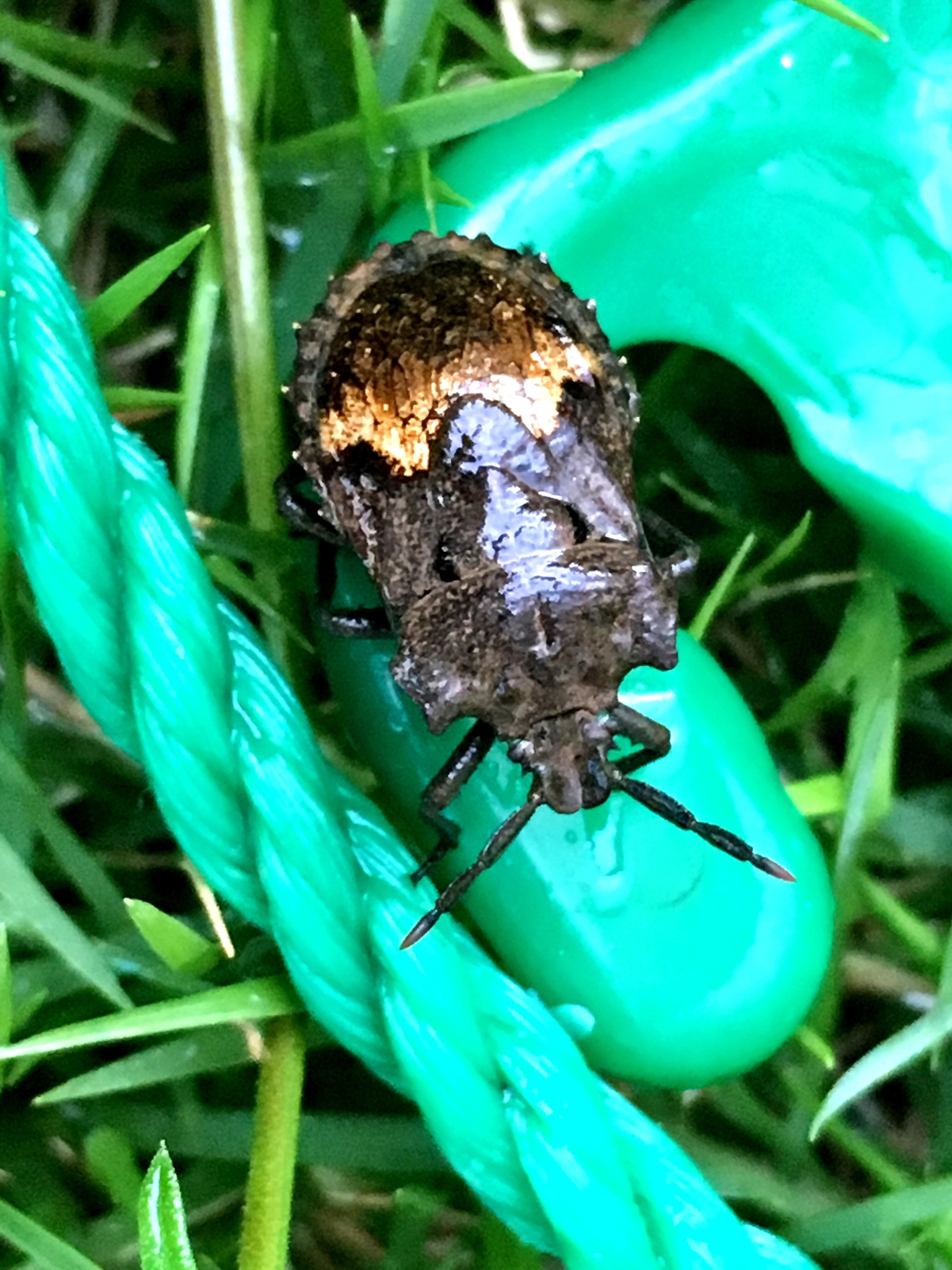

Scientific classification
- Domain: Eukaryota
- Kingdom: Animalia
- Phylum: Arthropoda
- Class: Insecta
- Order: Hemiptera
- Suborder: Heteroptera
- Family: Dinidoridae
- Genus: Megymenum
- Species: M. affine

Binomial name
- Megymenum affine Boisduval, 1835

= Megymenum affine =

Species of insect

Megymenum affine, the Cucurbit shield bug or pumpkin bug, is a species of true bug found in Australia and the Philippines.

== Description ==
M. affine's body (not including the antennae) is about 2–3 cm (0.79–1.18 in) in length.
