= Sagriva =

Scientific classification
- Kingdom: Animalia
- Phylum: Arthropoda
- Class: Insecta
- Order: Hemiptera
- Suborder: Heteroptera
- Family: Dinidoridae
- Subfamily: Dinidorinae
- Tribe: Dinidorini
- Genus: Sagriva; Spinola, 1850

Genus of true bugs

Sagriva is a genus of dinidoridae bugs. It occurs in South and Southeast Asia. Originally described in 1850 from the species Sagriva vittata, no other species were known for over a century, making the genus monotypic for that time. A second species, S. banna, was described in 2017.

== Description ==
The genus can be recognised by: head with mandibular plates longer than clypeus and converging in front of it; an angular, transversely directed projection in front of each eye, the eyes subpedunculate; the antennae each with 4 segments and the pedicel and basiflagellum angular in cross section and all faces deeply furrowed between the edges; the pronotum subquadrate in shape with its anterior margin much broader than the head; the wings often reduced (brachypterous); and the lateral margins and posterolateral angles of pregenital abdominal segments without tubercles.

As for the two species within Sagriva, S. vittata is larger (males 15.3–16.7 mm long, females 16.9–19.2 mm) and has a contrasting yellow, brown and black pattern. Sagriva banna is smaller (males 10.8-12.2 mm long, females 14.2–14.3 mm) and uniformly black.

== Ecology ==
Adults and nymphs of S. vittata have been collected from unidentified species of climbing Cucurbitaceae.
