= Neotropical realm =

One of Earth's eight biogeographic realms

The Neotropical realm (in purple)

The Neotropical realm is one of the eight biogeographic realms constituting Earth's land surface. Physically, it includes the tropical terrestrial ecoregions of the Americas and the entire South American temperate zone.

== Definition ==
The outlined ecoregions of the Neotropical realm, each of a colored biome. Note that this realm has 11 of 14 biomes, or major habitat types, as defined by Olson & Dinerstein, et al. (2001). The biomes not present are temperate coniferous forests, taiga and boreal forest, and tundra.: 01. Tropical and subtropical moist broadleaf forests; 02. Tropical and subtropical dry broadleaf forests; 03. Tropical and subtropical coniferous forests; 04. Temperate broadleaf and mixed forests; 05. Temperate coniferous forests; 06. Taiga and Boreal forest; 07. Tropical and subtropical grasslands, savannas, and shrublands; 08. Temperate grasslands, savannas, and shrublands; 09. Flooded grasslands and savannas; 10. Montane grasslands and shrublands; 11. Tundra; 12. Mediterranean forests, woodlands, and scrub; 13. Deserts and xeric shrublands; 14. Mangroves; Rock and Ice, or Abiotic Land Zones

In biogeography, the Neotropic or Neotropical realm is one of the eight terrestrial realms. This realm includes South America, Central America, the Caribbean Islands, and southern North America. In Mexico, the Yucatán Peninsula and southern lowlands, and most of the east and west coastlines, including the southern tip of the Baja California Peninsula are Neotropical. In the United States, South Florida and coastal Central Florida are considered Neotropical.

The realm also includes temperate southern South America. In contrast, the Neotropical Floristic Kingdom excludes southernmost South America, which instead is placed in the Antarctic kingdom.

The Neotropic is delimited by similarities in fauna or flora. Its fauna and flora are distinct from the Nearctic realm (which includes most of North America) because of the long separation of the two continents. The formation of the Isthmus of Panama joined the two continents two to three million years ago, precipitating the Great American Interchange, an important biogeographical event.

The Neotropic includes more tropical rainforest (tropical and subtropical moist broadleaf forests) than any other realm, extending from southern Mexico through Central America and northern South America to southern Brazil, including the vast Amazon rainforest. These rainforest ecoregions are one of the most important reserves of biodiversity on Earth. These rainforests are also home to a diverse array of indigenous peoples, who to varying degrees persist in their autonomous and traditional cultures and subsistence within this environment. The number of these peoples who are as yet relatively untouched by external influences continues to decline significantly, however, along with the near-exponential expansion of urbanization, roads, pastoralism and forest industries which encroach on their customary lands and environment. Nevertheless, amidst these declining circumstances this vast "reservoir" of human diversity continues to survive, albeit much depleted. In South America alone, some 350–400 indigenous languages and dialects are still living (down from an estimated 1,500 at the time of first European contact), in about 37 distinct language families and a further number of unclassified and isolate languages. Many of these languages and their cultures are also endangered. Accordingly, conservation in the Neotropical realm is a hot political concern, and raises many arguments about development versus indigenous versus ecological rights and access to or ownership of natural resources.

== Major ecological regions ==
The World Wide Fund (WWF) subdivides the realm into bioregions, defined as "geographic clusters of ecoregions that may span several habitat types, but have strong biogeographic affinities, particularly at taxonomic levels higher than the species level (genus, family)".

Laurel forest and other cloud forest are subtropical and mild temperate forest, found in areas with high humidity and relatively stable and mild temperatures. Tropical rainforest, tropical and subtropical moist broadleaf forests are highlight in Southern North America, Amazonia, Caribbean, Central America, Northern Andes and Central Andes.

=== Amazonia ===
The Amazonia bioregion is mostly covered by tropical moist broadleaf forest, including the vast Amazon rainforest, which stretches from the Andes Mountains to the Atlantic Ocean, and the lowland forests of the Guianas. The bioregion also includes tropical savanna and tropical dry forest ecoregions.

=== Central Andes ===
The Central Andes lie between the gulfs of Guayaquil and Penas and thus encompass southern Ecuador, Chile, Peru, western Bolivia, and northwest and western Argentina.

=== Eastern South America ===
Eastern South America includes the Caatinga xeric shrublands of northeastern Brazil, the broad Cerrado grasslands and savannas of the Brazilian Plateau, and the Pantanal and Chaco grasslands. The diverse Atlantic forests of eastern Brazil are separated from the forests of Amazonia by the Caatinga and Cerrado, and are home to a distinct flora and fauna.

=== Northern Andes ===
This region includes some northern parts of Venezuela and Colombia as well as adjacent islands. North of the Gulf of Guayaquil in Ecuador and Colombia, a series of accreted oceanic terranes (discrete allochthonous fragments) have developed that constitute the Baudo, or Coastal, Mountains and the Cordillera Occidental.

=== Orinoco ===
The Orinoco is a region of humid forested broadleaf forest and wetland primarily comprising the drainage basin for the Orinoco River and other adjacent lowland forested areas. This region includes most of Venezuela and parts of Colombia and Trinidad and Tobago.

=== Southern South America ===
The temperate forest ecoregions of southwestern South America, including the temperate rain forests of the Valdivian temperate rain forests and Magellanic subpolar forests ecoregions, and the Juan Fernández Islands and Desventuradas Islands, are a refuge for the ancient Antarctic flora, which includes trees like the southern beech (Nothofagus), podocarps, the alerce (Fitzroya cupressoides), and Araucaria pines like the monkey-puzzle tree (Araucaria araucana). These rainforests are endangered by extensive logging and their replacement by fast-growing non-native pines and eucalyptus.

== History ==
South America was originally part of the supercontinent of Gondwana, which included Africa, Australia, India, New Zealand, and Antarctica, and the Neotropic shares many plant and animal lineages with these other continents, including marsupial mammals and the Antarctic flora.

After the final breakup of the Gondwana about 110 million years ago, South America was separated from Africa and drifted north and west. 66 million years ago, the Cretaceous–Paleogene extinction event altered local flora and fauna. Much later, about two to three million years ago, South America was joined with North America by the formation of the Isthmus of Panama, which allowed a biotic exchange between the two continents, the Great American Interchange. South American species like the ancestors of the Virginia opossum (Didelphis virginiana) and the armadillo moved into North America, and North Americans like the ancestors of South America's camelids, including the llama (Lama glama), moved south. The long-term effect of the exchange was the extinction of many South American species, mostly by outcompetition by northern species.

== Endemic animals and plants ==
=== Animals ===
The Neotropical realm has 31 endemic bird families, which is over twice the number of any other realm. They include tanagers, rheas, tinamous, curassows, antbirds, ovenbirds, toucans, and seriemas. Bird families originally unique to the Neotropics include hummingbirds (family Trochilidae) and wrens (family Troglodytidae).

Mammal groups originally unique to the Neotropics include:

- Order Xenarthra: anteaters, sloths, and armadillos
- New World monkeys
- Solenodontidae, the solenodons
- Caviomorpha rodents, including capybaras, guinea pigs, hutias, and chinchillas
- American opossums (order Didelphimorphia) and shrew opossums (order Paucituberculata)

The Neotropical realm has 63 endemic fish families and subfamilies, which is more than any other realm. Neotropical fishes include more than 5,700 species, and represent at least 66 distinct lineages in continental freshwaters (Albert and Reis, 2011). The well-known red-bellied piranha is endemic to the Neotropic realm, occupying a larger geographic area than any other piranha species. Some fish groups originally unique to the Neotropics include:

- Order Gymnotiformes: Neotropical electric fishes
- Family Characidae: tetras and allies
- Family Loricariidae: armoured catfishes
- Subfamily Cichlinae: Neotropical cichlids
- Subfamily Poeciliinae: guppies and relatives

Examples of other animal groups that are entirely or mainly restricted to the Neotropical region include:

- Caimans
- New World coral snakes
- Poison dart frogs
- Dactyloidae ("anoles")
- Rock iguanas (Cyclura)
- Preponini and Anaeini butterflies (including Agrias)
- Brassolini and Morphini butterflies (including Caligo and Morpho)
- Callicorini butterflies
- Heliconiini butterflies
- Ithomiini butterflies
- Riodininae butterflies
- Eumaeini butterflies
- Firetips or firetail skipper butterflies
- Euglossini bees
- Augochlorini bees
- Pseudostigmatidae ("giant damselflies")
- Mantoididae (short-bodied mantises)
- Canopidae, Megarididae, and Phloeidae (pentatomoid bugs)
- Aetalionidae and Melizoderidae (treehoppers)
- Gonyleptidae (harvestmen)

=== Plants ===
According to Simberloff. as of 1984 there were a total of 92,128 species of flowering plants (Angiosperms) in the Neotropics. Plant families endemic and partly subendemic to the realm are, according to Takhtajan (1978), Hymenophyllopsidaceae, Marcgraviaceae, Caryocaraceae, Pellicieraceae, Quiinaceae, Peridiscaceae, Bixaceae, Cochlospermaceae, Tovariaceae, Lissocarpaceae (Lissocarpa), Brunelliaceae, Dulongiaceae, Columelliaceae, Julianiaceae, Picrodendraceae, Goupiaceae, Desfontainiaceae, Plocospermataceae, Tropaeolaceae, Dialypetalanthaceae (Dialypetalanthus), Nolanaceae (Nolana), Calyceraceae, Heliconiaceae, Cannaceae, Thurniaceae, and Cyclanthaceae.

Plant families that originated in the Neotropic include Bromeliaceae, Cactaceae, Cannaceae and Heliconiaceae.

Plant species with economic importance originally unique to the Neotropic include:

- Potato (Solanum tuberosum)
- Tomato (Solanum lycopersicum)
- Cacao tree (Theobroma cacao), source of cocoa and chocolate
- Maize (Zea mays)
- Passion fruit (Passiflora edulis)
- Guava (Psidium guajava)
- Lima bean (Phaseolus lunatus)
- Cotton (Gossypium barbadense)
- Cassava (Manihot esculenta)
- Sweet potato (Ipomoea batatas)
- Amaranth (Amaranthus caudatus)
- Quinoa (Chenopodium quinoa)

== General and cited bibliography ==
- Albert, J. S., and R. E. Reis (2011). Historical Biogeography of Neotropical Freshwater Fishes. University of California Press, Berkeley. 424 pp. ISBN 978-0-520-26868-5.
- Bequaert, Joseph C. "An Introductory Study of Polistes in the United States and Canada with Descriptions of Some New North and South American Forms (Hymenoptera; Vespidæ)". Journal of the New York Entomological Society 48.1 (1940): 1–31.
- Cox, C. B.; P. D. Moore (1985). Biogeography: An Ecological and Evolutionary Approach (Fourth Edition). Blackwell Scientific Publications, Oxford.
- Dinerstein, E., Olson, D. Graham, D. J. et al. (1995). A Conservation Assessment of the Terrestrial Ecoregions of Latin America and the Caribbean. World Bank, Washington, D.C.
- Olson, D. M., B. Chernoff, G. Burgess, I. Davidson, P. Canevari, E. Dinerstein, G. Castro, V. Morisset, R. Abell, and E. Toledo. 1997. Freshwater biodiversity of Latin America and the Caribbean: a conservation assessment. Draft report. World Wildlife Fund-U.S., Wetlands International, Biodiversity Support Program, and United States Agency for International Development, Washington, D.C.
- Reis, R. E., S. O. Kullander, and C. J. Ferraris Jr. 2003. Check List of the Freshwater Fishes of South and Central America. Edipucrs, Porto Alegre. 729 pp.
- Udvardy, M. D. F. (1975). A classification of the biogeographical provinces of the world. IUCN Occasional Paper no. 18. Morges, Switzerland: IUCN.
- van der Sleen, Peter, and James S. Albert, eds. Field Guide to the Fishes of the Amazon, Orinoco, and Guianas. Princeton University Press, 2017.

Ecoregion	Location(s)
Alai–Western Tian Shan steppe	Kazakhstan, Tajikistan, Uzbekistan
Altai steppe and semi-desert	Kazakhstan
Central Anatolian steppe	Turkey
Daurian forest steppe	China, Mongolia, Russia
Eastern Anatolian montane steppe	Armenia, Azerbaijan, Georgia, Iran, Turkey
Emin Valley steppe	China, Kazakhstan
Faroe Islands boreal grasslands	Faroe Islands, Denmark
Gissaro–Alai open woodlands	Kyrgyzstan, Tajikistan, Uzbekistan
Kazakh forest steppe	Kazakhstan, Russia
Kazakh steppe	Kazakhstan, Russia
Kazakh Uplands	Kazakhstan
Mongolian–Manchurian grassland	China, Mongolia, Russia
Pontic steppe	Kazakhstan, Moldova, Romania, Russia, Ukraine, Bulgaria
Sayan Intermontane steppe	Russia
Selenge–Orkhon forest steppe	Mongolia, Russia
South Siberian forest steppe	Russia
Syrian xeric grasslands and shrublands	Iraq, Jordan, Syria
Tian Shan foothill arid steppe	China, Kazakhstan, Kyrgyzstan
