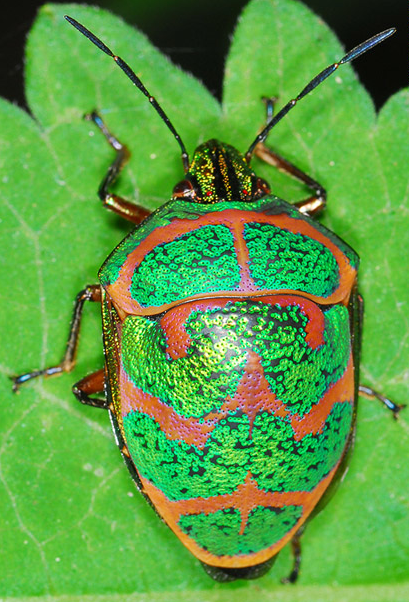
- Poecilocoris lewisi, South Korea

Scientific classification
- Domain: Eukaryota
- Kingdom: Animalia
- Phylum: Arthropoda
- Class: Insecta
- Order: Hemiptera
- Suborder: Heteroptera
- Family: Scutelleridae
- Subfamily: Scutellerinae
- Tribe: Scutellerini
- Genus: Poecilocoris; Dallas, 1848

= Poecilocoris =

Genus of true bugs

Poecilocoris is a genus of shield-backed bugs in the family Scutelleridae. Species in Poecilocoris are found mainly in south and east Asia, including Indomalaya.

== Species ==
The following are included in BioLib.cz:

subgenus Parapoecilocoris Schouteden, 1904

1. Poecilocoris interruptus (Westwood, 1837)

subgenus Poecilocoris Dallas, 1848

1. Poecilocoris anisopilus Walker, 1867
2. Poecilocoris balteatus (Distant, 1892)
3. Poecilocoris capitatus Yang, 1934
4. Poecilocoris childreni (White, 1839)
5. Poecilocoris crowleyi Distant, 1901
6. Poecilocoris dissimilis Martin, 1902
7. Poecilocoris druraei (Linnaeus, 1771)
8. Poecilocoris latus Dallas, 1848
9. Poecilocoris lewisi (Distant, 1883)
10. Poecilocoris nepalensis (Herrich-Schaeffer, 1837)
11. Poecilocoris nigricollis Horváth, 1912
12. Poecilocoris obesus Dallas, 1851
13. Poecilocoris orientalis Ahmad & Kamaluddin, 1982
14. Poecilocoris ornatus Dallas, 1851
15. Poecilocoris plenisignatus Walker, 1867
16. Poecilocoris pseudolatus Ahmad & Kamaluddin, 1982
17. Poecilocoris pulcher Dallas, 1848
18. Poecilocoris purpurascens (Westwood, 1837)
19. Poecilocoris rufigenis Dallas, 1851
20. Poecilocoris sanszesignatus Yang, 1934
21. Poecilocoris splendidulus Esaki, 1935
22. † Poecilocoris rottensis Statz & Wagner, 1950
