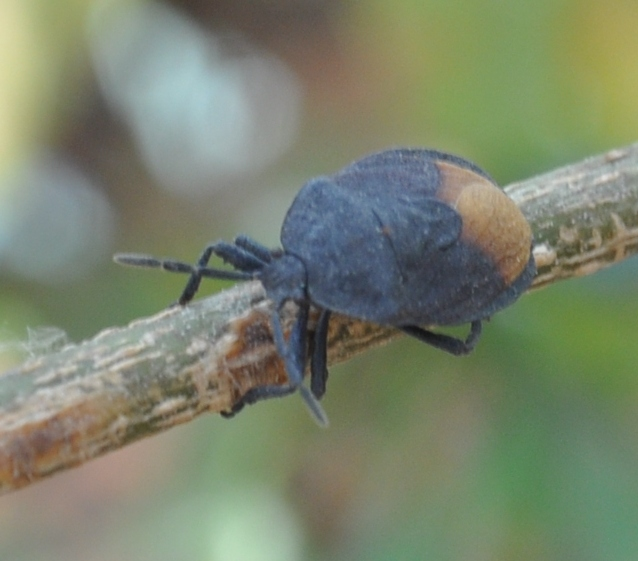
- Cyclopelta siccifolia from India

Scientific classification
- Kingdom: Animalia
- Phylum: Arthropoda
- Class: Insecta
- Order: Hemiptera
- Suborder: Heteroptera
- Family: Dinidoridae
- Subfamily: Dinidorinae
- Genus: Cyclopelta; Amyot and Serville, 1843

Type species
- Cyclopelta obscura (Lepeletier & Serville, 1828)

= Cyclopelta =

Genus of true bugs

Cyclopelta is a genus of Dinidorid bug found in Africa and Asia. There are 14 species in the genus with 8 found in Asia and 6 in Africa. Some species are known to form large aggregation on trees and can cause damage in a few trees of economic importance.

The genus Cyclopelta has a four-segmented antenna. Species in the genus have two to four pairs of conjunctival processes in their aedeagus, a feature shared with Coridius, Colpoproctus and Dinidor. In Cyclopelta the femora are spined along the surface and the females have hind tibiae that are opaque on the inner surface. The underside does not have a series of yellow spots as in Dinidor. Species within this genus include:

- C. abdominalis Distant, 1920
- C. bechynei Durai, 1987
- C. bruneiensis Lis, 1992
- C. funebris (Fabricius, 1775)
- C. gibbosa Kocorek, 2013
- C. obscura (Lepeletier & Serville, 1828)
- C. ornata Stål, 1870
- C. parva Distant, 1900)
- C. robusta Lis & Lis, 2001
- C. rugosa Distant, 1921
- C. siccifolia (Westwood, 1837)
- ?C. subhimalayensis Strickland, 1932 (type missing)
- C. trimaculata Vollenhoven, 1868
- C. tristis (Stål, 1865)
