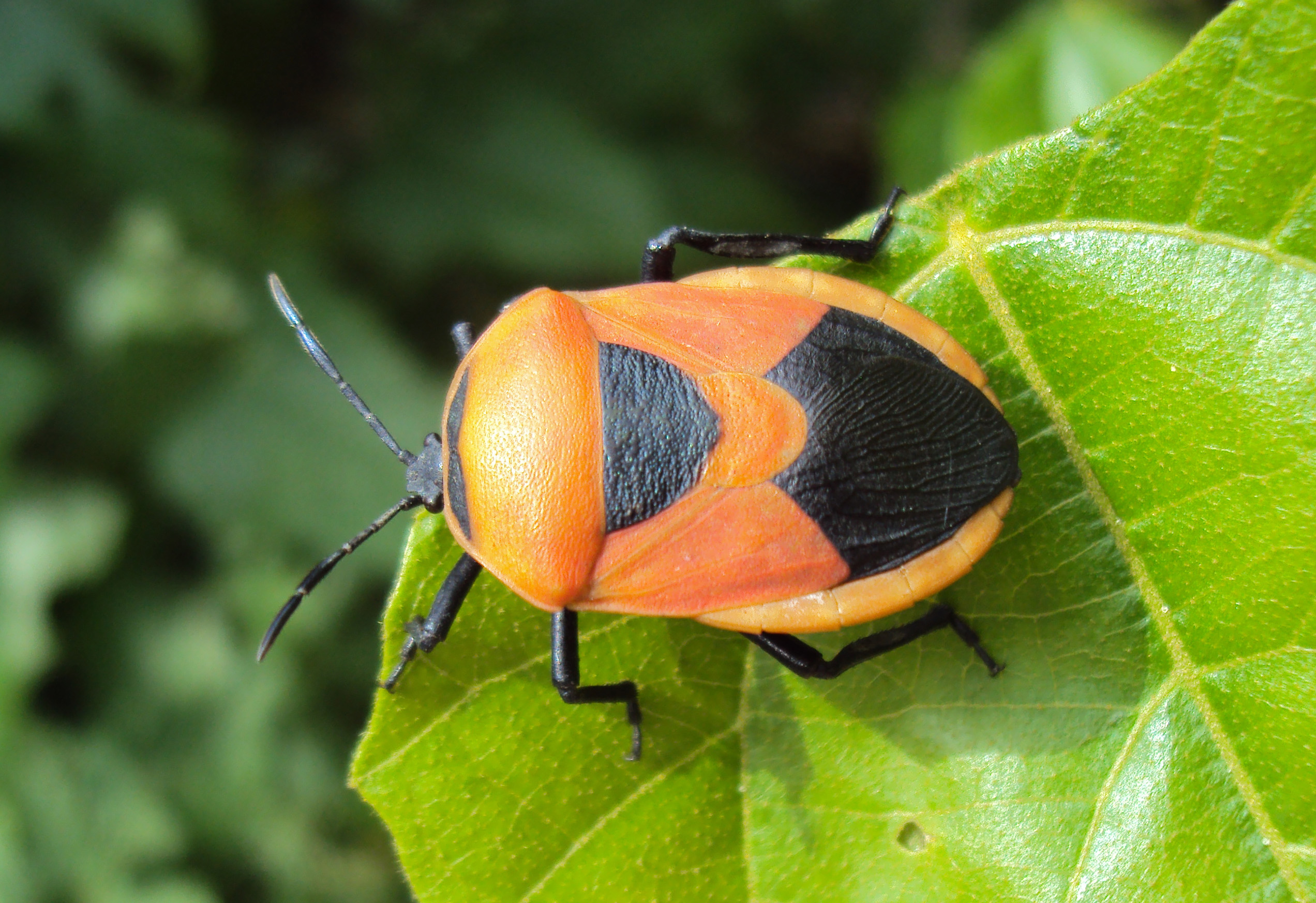
- Coridius janus

Scientific classification
- Domain: Eukaryota
- Kingdom: Animalia
- Phylum: Arthropoda
- Class: Insecta
- Order: Hemiptera
- Suborder: Heteroptera
- Family: Dinidoridae
- Subfamily: Dinidorinae
- Genus: Coridius; Illiger, 1807

Synonyms
- Amacosia Spinola, 1850; Aspongopus Laporte, 1833; Peltagopus Signoret, 1861; Spongopodium Spinola, 1837

= Coridius =

Genus of true bugs

Coridius is a genus of dinidorid bugs. They suck sap mainly from plants belonging to the family Cucurbitaceae. Most described species have native ranges in Africa and Asia. Several species are eaten in parts of South and Southeast Asia. Some species have extended into Europe and are considered as pests on cucurbit crops.

== Species ==
Coridius viduatus in the Al Marmoom Desert Conservation Reserve

1. Coridius affinis (Costa, 1847)
2. Coridius alternatus (Distant, 1908)
3. Coridius assamensis (Distant, 1902)
4. Coridius brunneus (Thunberg, 1783)
5. Coridius castaneus (Signoret)
6. Coridius chinensis (Dallas, 1851)
7. Coridius cuprifer (Westwood, 1837)
8. Coridius cuprinus (Stål, 1870)
9. Coridius deckerti Lis, 1990
10. Coridius dimorphus (China, 1928)
11. Coridius divergens (Distant, 1878)
12. Coridius dubitabilis (Fairmaire, 1858)
13. Coridius duraiae Lis, 1990
14. Coridius farleyi (Distant)
15. Coridius flavomarginatus (Signoret)
16. Coridius fuscus (Westwood, 1837)
17. Coridius janus (Fabricius, 1775) type species (as Cimex ianus Fabricius)
18. Coridius kerzhneri Lis, 1990
19. Coridius laosanus (Distant, 1921)
20. Coridius lenoiri (Schouteden)
21. Coridius lividus (Distant, 1898)
22. Coridius marginatus (A. Costa, 1847)
23. Coridius neobrunneus Ahmad, Hussain & Kamaluddin, 1997
24. Coridius nepalensis (Westwood, 1837)
25. Coridius nubilis (Westwood, 1837)
26. Coridius nubilus (Westwood)
27. Coridius patruelis (Stål)
28. Coridius prolixus Lethierry, 1881
29. Coridius pseudaffinis Lis, 1996
30. Coridius pseudoflavomarginatus Kocorek, 2003
31. Coridius putoni (Bolivar)
32. Coridius reflexus (Westwood, 1837)
33. Coridius remipes (Stål, 1853)
34. Coridius rufomarginatus Carlini, 1895
35. Coridius sanguinolentus (Westwood, 1837)
36. Coridius singhalanus (Distant, 1900)
37. Coridius turbatensis Ahmad, Hussain & Kamaluddin, 1997
38. Coridius viduatus (Fabricius, 1794)
39. Coridius xanthopterus (Fairmaire)
