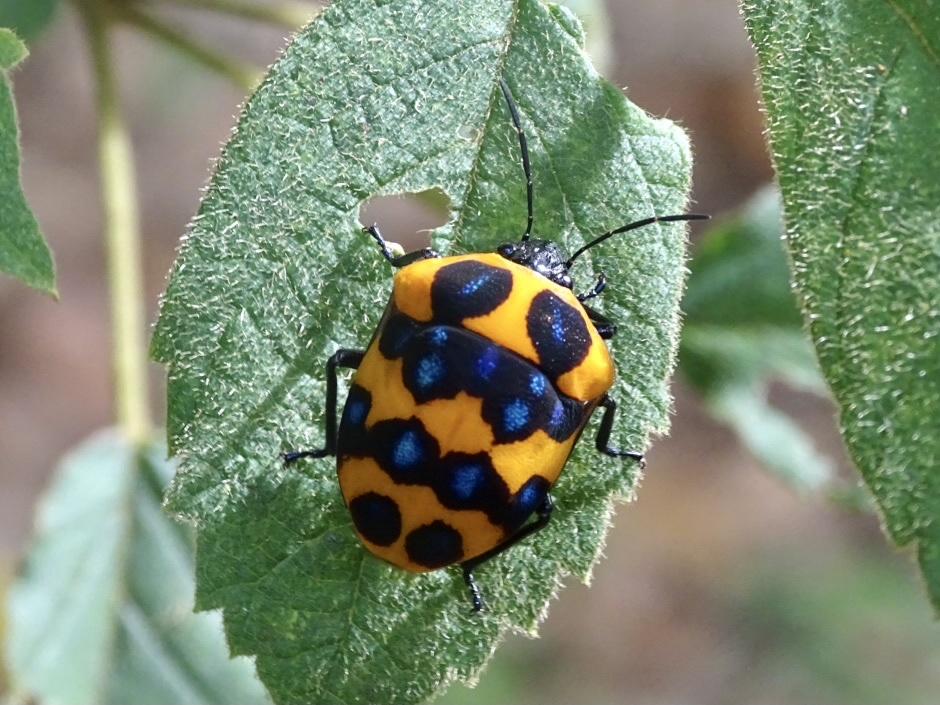

Scientific classification
- Kingdom: Animalia
- Phylum: Arthropoda
- Class: Insecta
- Order: Hemiptera
- Suborder: Heteroptera
- Family: Scutelleridae
- Genus: Poecilocoris
- Species: P. druraei

Binomial name
- Poecilocoris druraei Linnaeus, 1771

= Poecilocoris druraei =

Species of jewel bug

Poecilcoris druraei is a species of jewel bug described by Carl Linnaeus in 1771. It is in the family Scutelleridae and is native to Hong Kong, Taiwan, and Thailand.

== Taxonomy ==
Poecilcoris druraei has no subspecies, hower it does have one junior synonym, P. watanabei (Matsumura,1913) due to a misidentification.

=== Poecilcoris watanabei ===
The male "holotype" of P. watanabei is discovered sometime after the first description of it by Shonen Matsumura in 1913. Upon it, this holotype is almost the same to P. druraei, although the description of P. watanabei matches.

== Ecology ==
Poecilcoris druraei thrives on Morus alba, Camellia oleifera, and Camellia sinensis.
