= Saileriolidae =

Scientific classification
- Kingdom: Animalia
- Phylum: Arthropoda
- Class: Insecta
- Order: Hemiptera
- Suborder: Heteroptera
- Infraorder: Pentatomomorpha
- Superfamily: Pentatomoidea
- Family: Saileriolidae; China & Slater, 1956

Genera
- Bannacoris; Ruckesona; Saileriola

Family of true bugs

Saileriolidae is a family of true bugs and is considered a basal or "primitive" family within the stink bug lineage. They are found only in Asia. Originally included within the family Urostylididae, the group has recently been recognized as a separate family-rank lineage.
