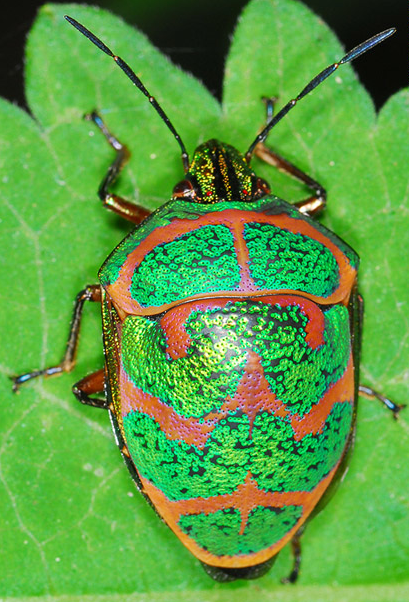

Scientific classification
- Kingdom: Animalia
- Phylum: Arthropoda
- Clade: Pancrustacea
- Class: Insecta
- Order: Hemiptera
- Suborder: Heteroptera
- Family: Scutelleridae
- Genus: Poecilocoris
- Species: P. lewisi

Binomial name
- Poecilocoris lewisi (Distant, 1883)

= Poecilocoris lewisi =

Species of true bug

Poecilocoris lewisi, known as the clown stink bug, is a species of shield bug found in eastern Asia.

Clown stink bug in Japan
