= Lestonia =

Scientific classification
- Domain: Eukaryota
- Kingdom: Animalia
- Phylum: Arthropoda
- Class: Insecta
- Order: Hemiptera
- Suborder: Heteroptera
- Family: Lestoniidae
- Genus: Lestonia; China, 1955

Genus of insects

Lestonia is a genus of true bugs belonging to the monotypic family Lestoniidae.

Species:

- Lestonia grossi McDonald, 1969
- Lestonia haustorifera China, 1955
