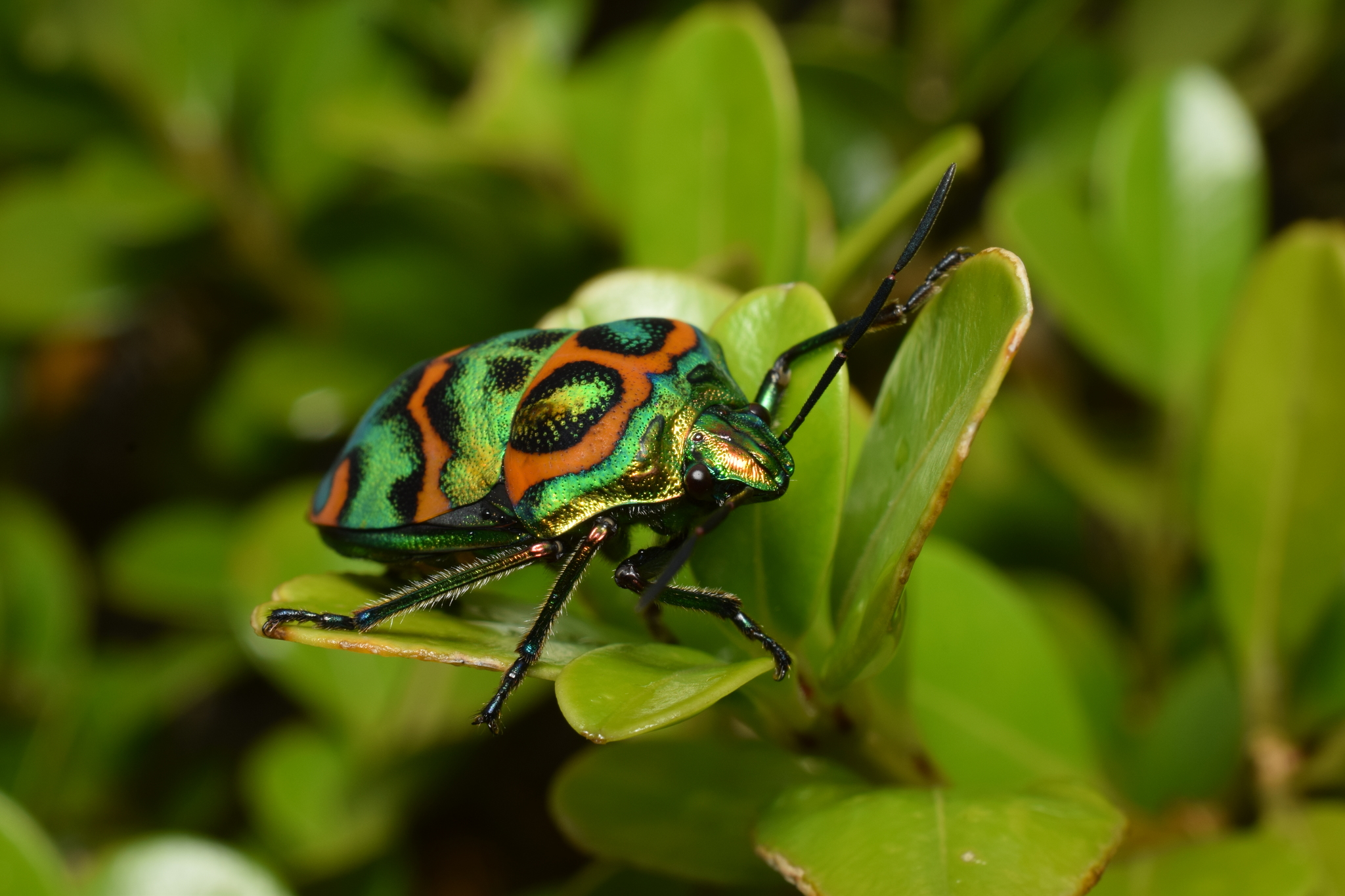

Scientific classification
- Domain: Eukaryota
- Kingdom: Animalia
- Phylum: Arthropoda
- Class: Insecta
- Order: Hemiptera
- Suborder: Heteroptera
- Family: Scutelleridae
- Genus: Poecilocoris
- Species: P. splendidulus

Binomial name
- Poecilocoris splendidulus Esaki, 1935

= Poecilocoris splendidulus =

Species of jewel bug

Poecilocoris splendidulus is a species of jewel bug in the family Scutelleridae.
