= Thaumastella =

Scientific classification
- Domain: Eukaryota
- Kingdom: Animalia
- Phylum: Arthropoda
- Class: Insecta
- Order: Hemiptera
- Suborder: Heteroptera
- Family: Thaumastellidae
- Genus: Thaumastella; Horváth, 1896

Genus of insects

Thaumastella is a genus of true bugs belonging to the monotypic family Thaumastellidae.

Species:

- Thaumastella aradoides Horvath, 1896
- Thaumastella elizabethae Schaefer & Wilson, 1971
- Thaumastella namaquaensis Jacobs, 1989
