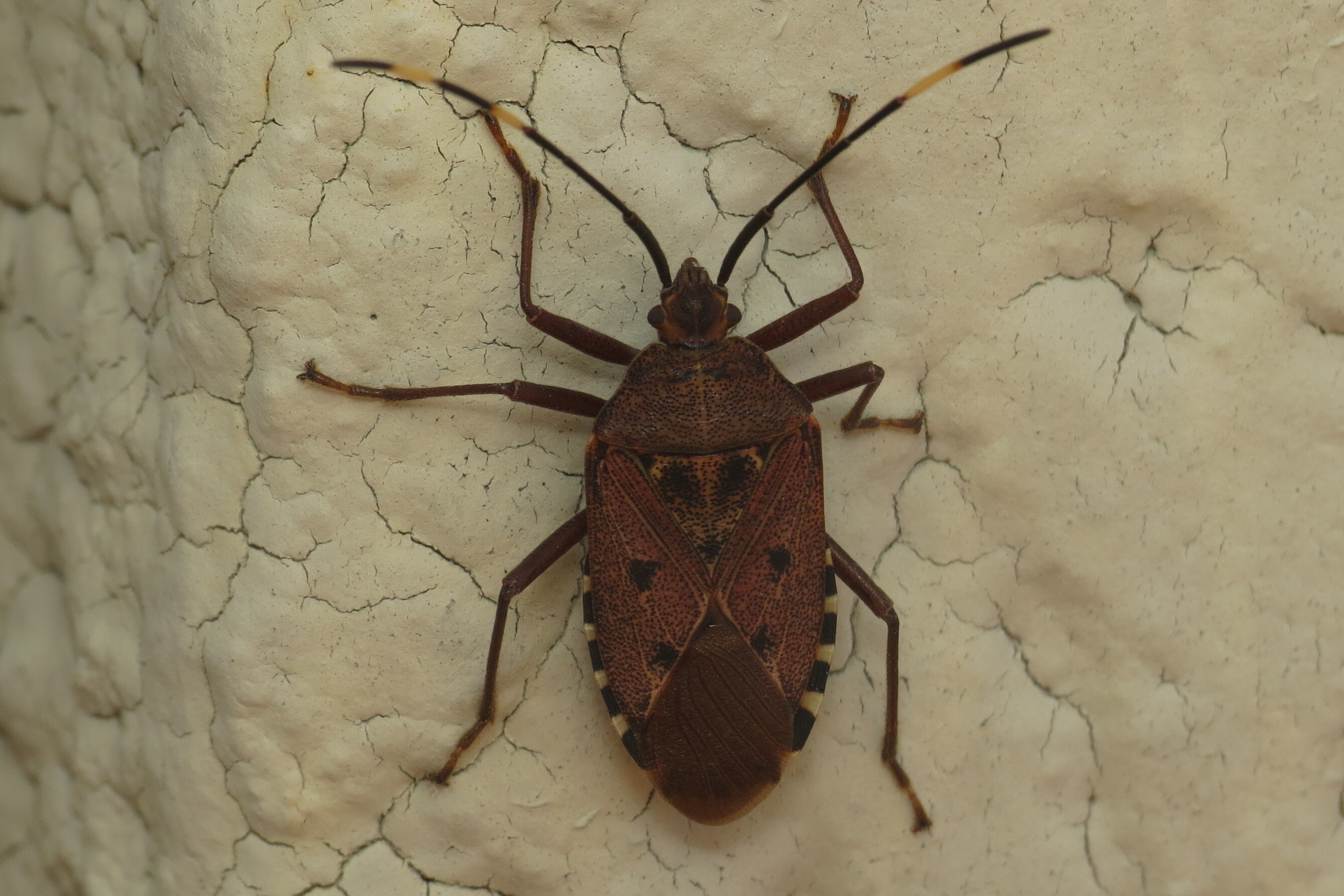
- Urochela quadrinotata

Scientific classification
- Kingdom: Animalia
- Phylum: Arthropoda
- Class: Insecta
- Order: Hemiptera
- Suborder: Heteroptera
- Superfamily: Pentatomoidea
- Family: Urostylididae; Dallas, 1851

Genera
- Cobbenicoris Ren, 1998; Eurhynchiocoris Reuter, 1881; Tessaromerus Kirkaldy, 1908; Urochelellus Yang, 1937; Urolabida Westwood, 1837; Urostylis Westwood, 1837; Urochela Dallas, 1850; Yangicoris Ren, 1998

= Urostylididae =

Family of true bugs

Urostylididae is a family of true bugs and is considered a basal or "primitive" family within the stink-bug lineage. They are found only in Asia. Older works used the spelling Urostylidae but this clashes with the name used for a protozoan family and a spelling correction (emendation) has been suggested that also avoids the confusion created by homonyms. The family name Urolabididae has also been used for some members in the past.

This family has about 100 species, with distribution limited mainly to eastern Asia. Urostylidids are 4 to 15 mm and somewhat longer than broad with elongated legs, three tarsal segments, and a small head. The antenna has 5 segments of which the first is longer than the head. The base of the antenna has broad tubercles and has a ringed appearance. The simple eyes or ocelli, when present (Urolabida lacks ocelli), are very close to each other. They show a wide separation between the hind and mid coxae on the underside. Other important family characters are the presence of a structure for stridulation, the stridulitrum on the first anal vein of the hind wing, and bristles on the claws. The female genital structure has nine gonocoxites that form a M or W-shaped sclerite. They suck plant sap. The male reproductive anatomy suggests close affinities to the Tessaratomidae subfamily Natalicolinae. The spermatheca has two pump flanges in two genera which is a feature found also in the Aradidae and Leptopodidae. Thus the phylogeny of the group is unclear but lies within the Pentatomoidea. In the past the family was divided into two subfamilies, but one group, the Saileriolinae, has since been suggested as a distinct family, Saileriolidae, by at least two studies. The position of Saileriolidae within the Pentatomoidea is still unclear.
