= Canopus (insect) =

Scientific classification
- Kingdom: Animalia
- Phylum: Arthropoda
- Clade: Pancrustacea
- Class: Insecta
- Order: Hemiptera
- Suborder: Heteroptera
- Infraorder: Pentatomomorpha
- Superfamily: Pentatomoidea
- Family: Canopidae; Amyot & Serville, 1843
- Genus: Canopus; Fabricius, 1803

Genus of insects

Canopus is a genus of Neotropical bugs with about six species that form the family Canopidae. Bugs in the family Canopidae are small (5–7 mm long) and have a convex lady-bird beetle like shape and are thought to be fungus feeders. The scutellum completely covers the abdomen and wings. The antennae are five segmented.

Eight species are known:

- C. andinus Horváth
- C. burmeisteri McAtee and Malloch
- C. caesus (Germar)
- C. fabricii McAtee and Malloch
- C. germari McAtee and Malloch
- C. globosus Horváth
- C. impressus Fabricius
- C. orbicularis Horváth
