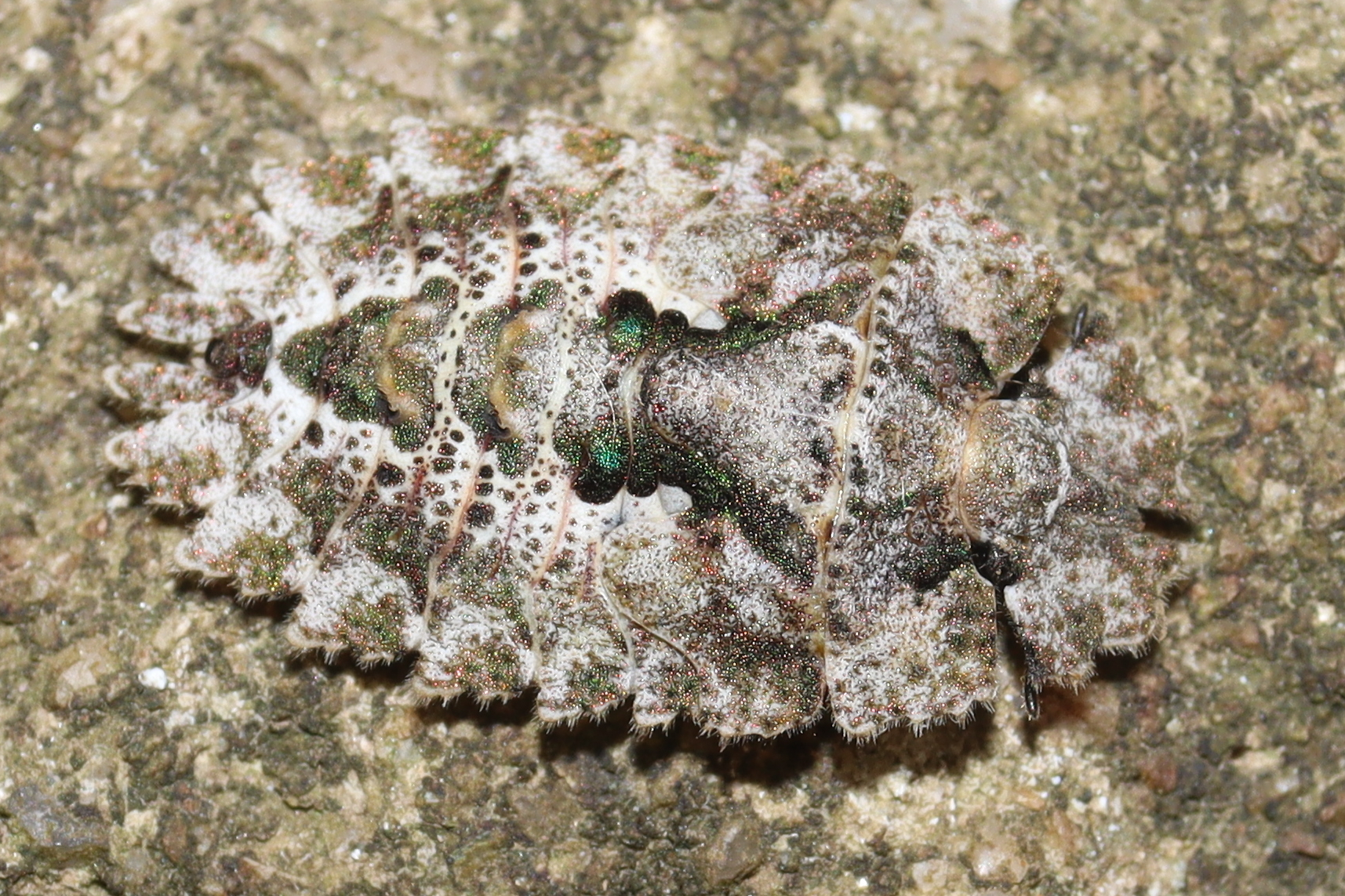
- Phloeophana longirostris nymph

Scientific classification
- Domain: Eukaryota
- Kingdom: Animalia
- Phylum: Arthropoda
- Class: Insecta
- Order: Hemiptera
- Family: Phloeidae

= Phloeidae =

Family of insects

Phloeidae is a family of true bugs belonging to the order Hemiptera. They are commonly known as Neotropical bark bugs due to their South American distribution, cryptic coloration, and flattened body.

== Distribution ==
Though these insects are found mainly in Brazil, some authors have reported their presence in French Guiana, Argentina, and Chile. There is little evidence to support their presence in Chile, but various citizen science reports suggest their presence in French Guiana and Argentina.

== Taxonomy ==
This family includes two genera and three species:

- Phloea Lepeletier & Audinet-Serville, 1825
  - Phloea corticata (Drury, 1773)
  - Phloea subquadrata Spinola, 1837
- Phloeophana Kirkaldy, 1908
  - Phloeophana longirostris (Spinola, 1837)
