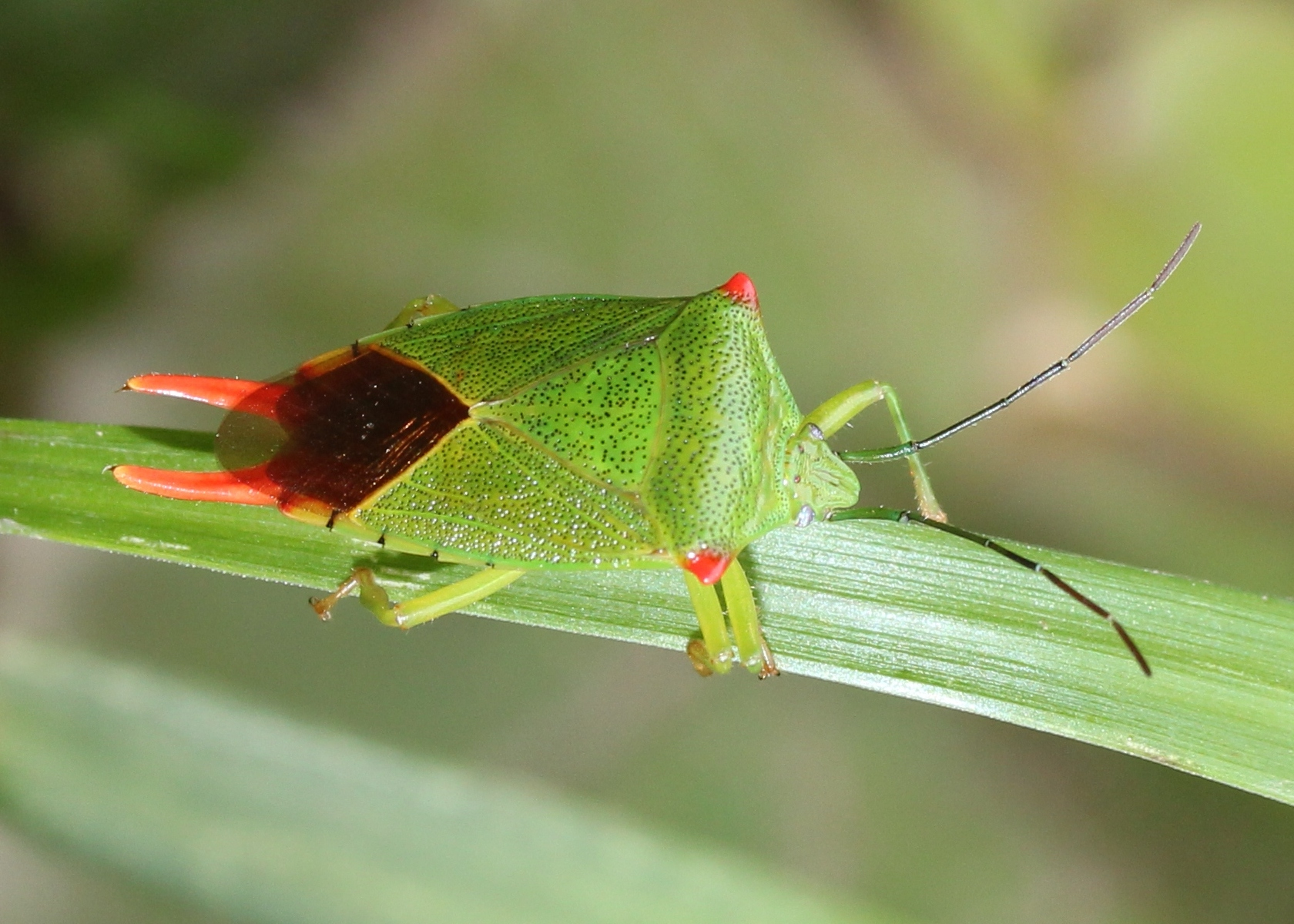

Scientific classification
- Kingdom: Animalia
- Phylum: Arthropoda
- Class: Insecta
- Order: Hemiptera
- Suborder: Heteroptera
- Family: Acanthosomatidae
- Genus: Acanthosoma
- Species: A. labiduroides

Binomial name
- Acanthosoma labiduroides Jakovlev, 1880

= Acanthosoma labiduroides =

Species of true bug

Acanthosoma labiduroides is a species of true bug in the family Acanthosomatidae.

== Name ==
The insect is called ハサミツノカメムシ (hasamitsu-no-kamemushi, "scissor stink bug") in Japanese.

== Description ==
The species' colour is green with yellow legs, orange antennae, and a brown back.

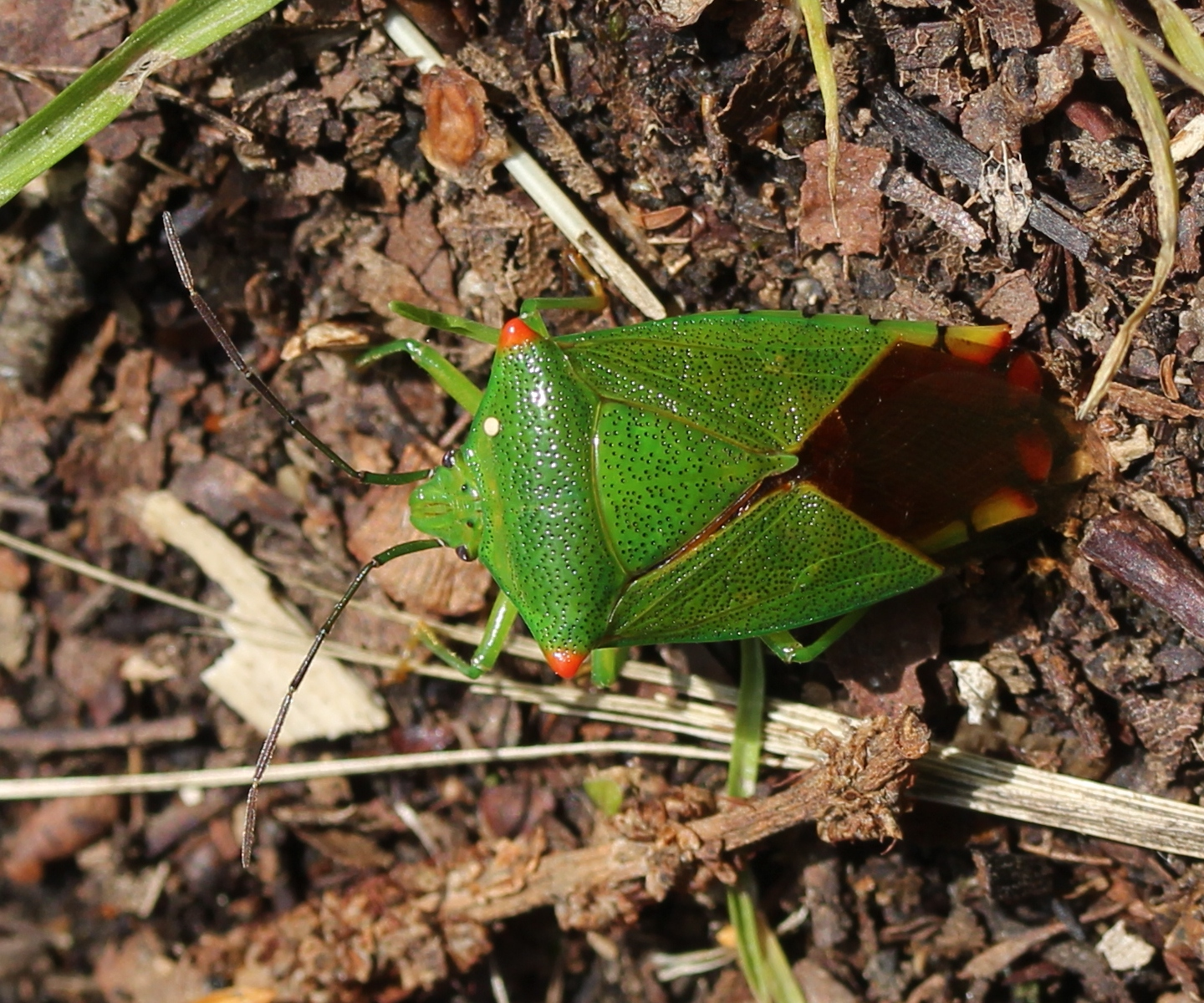
female

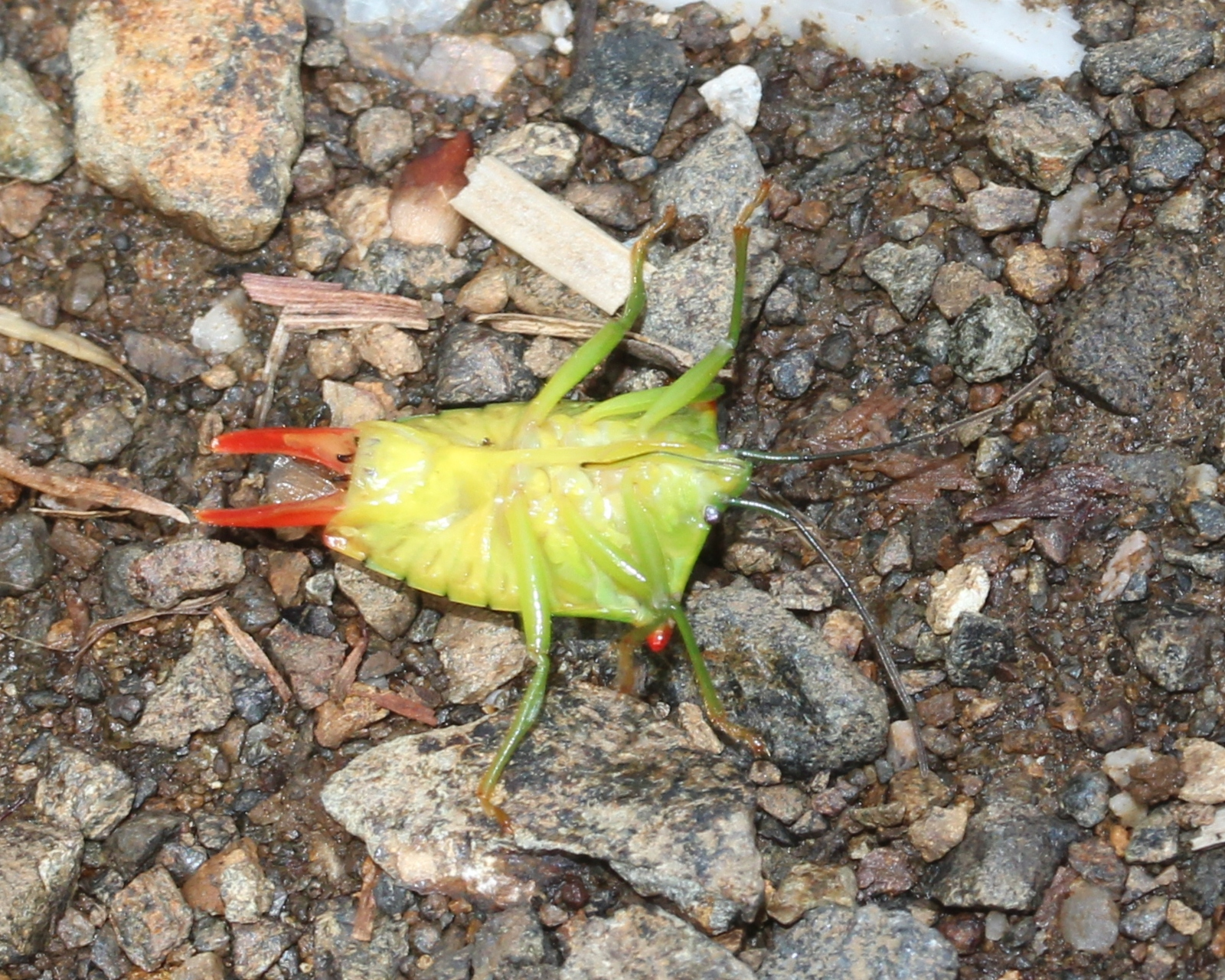
male
