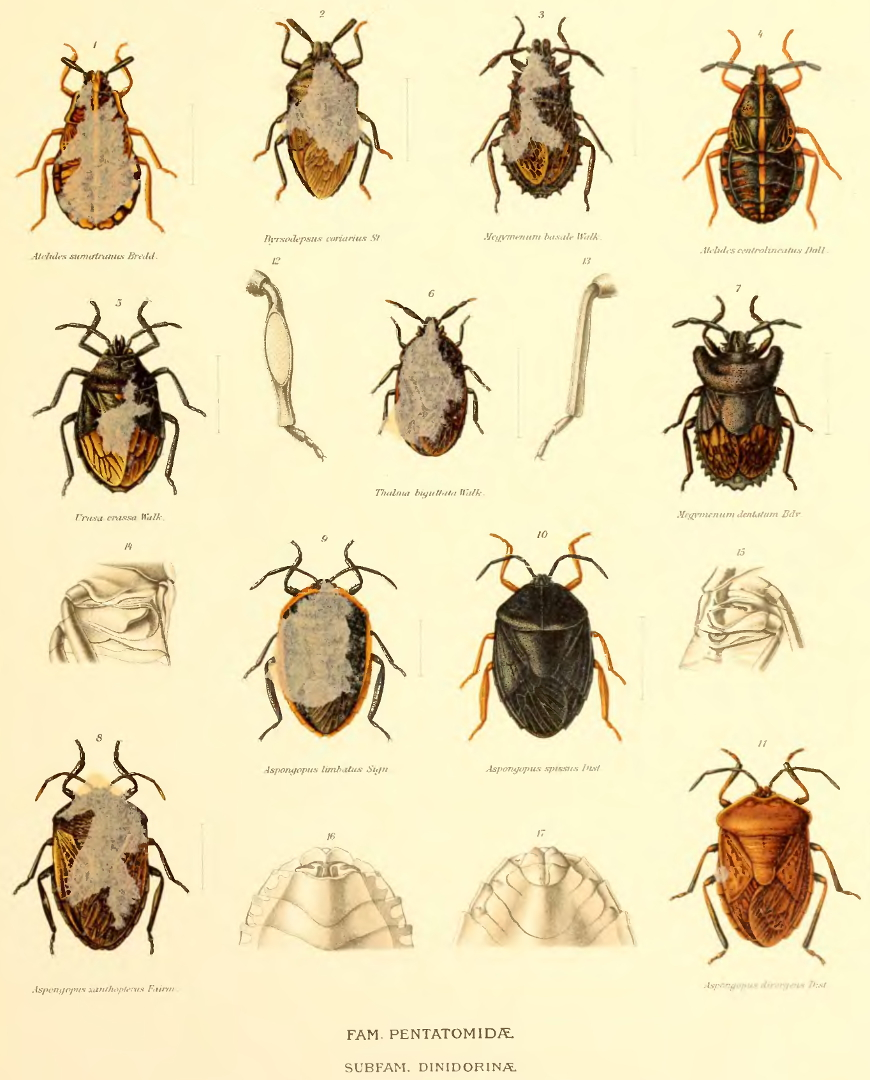
- Several species of Dinidoridae.

Scientific classification
- Kingdom: Animalia
- Phylum: Arthropoda
- Clade: Pancrustacea
- Class: Insecta
- Order: Hemiptera
- Suborder: Heteroptera
- Superfamily: Pentatomoidea
- Family: Dinidoridae; Stål, 1867

Synonyms
- Coridiinae Schumacher, 1924

= Dinidoridae =

Family of true bugs

Dinidoridae is a small family of hemipteran "true bugs" comprising about sixteen genera and a hundred species the Hemiptera suborder Heteroptera. As a group the family does not have any common name. Until the late 19th century they were generally regarded as a subfamily of Pentatomidae.

== Description ==
Most members of the family Dinidoridae are large and robust in build; the bodies of some species may exceed 27 mm in length. In shape they are ovoid to oblong. The head and pronotum have lateral keels. The scutellum is moderately short and blunt, typically some 50% of the abdominal length.

The antennae have four or five segments, with at least two of the subapical segments more or less flattened. The antenniferous tubercles are set below the lateral head margins, and are not visible from above. The tarsi have two or three segments. In most genera trichobothria occur in pairs on the third to the seventh abdominal sterna, but Eumenotes species have only one trichobothrium per segment. Each pair of trichobothria is arranged transversely on a large callus mesad of the abdominal spiracles.

== Taxonomy ==
The taxon corresponding to the modern family Dinidoridae was originally established by Stål in 1870 as the subfamily Dinidorida of the family Pentatomidae. Subsequent authorities such as Lethierry and Severin applied the name Dinidoridae, but in a subfamily sense in spite of the implication of the suffix "-dae". Twentieth century authorities treated the Dinidoridae as a distinct family, which now is the established view.

Two subfamilies are generally recognised, the Dinidorinae and the Megymeninae. They may be distinguished as follows:

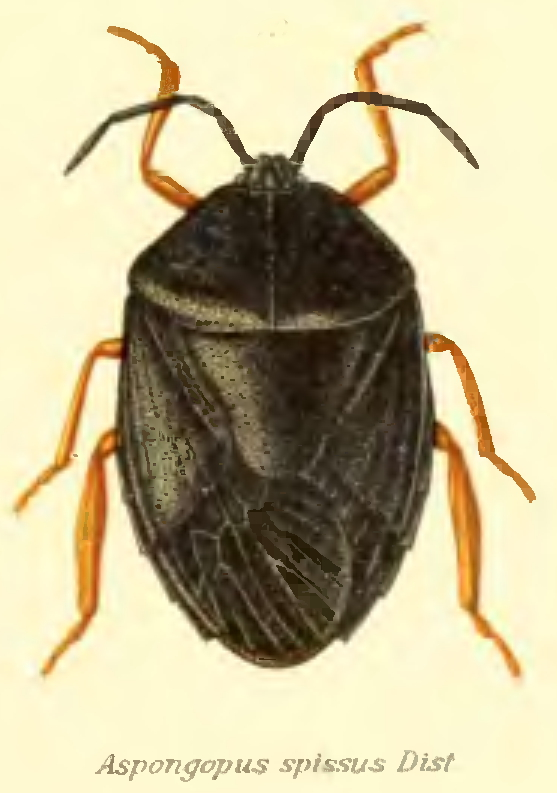
Coridius spissus, a typical member of the subfamily Dinidorinae.

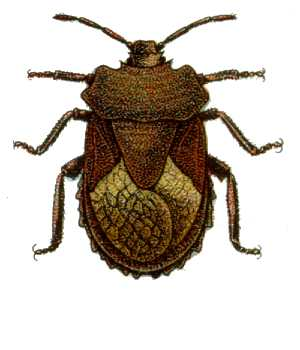
Megymenum affine, an Australasian member of the subfamily Megymeninae

- The subfamily Dinidorinae tend to have a smooth pronotum and to be comparatively smooth in outline; the appearance of the scutellum and the dorsum in general have a homogeneously convex appearance. In the Megymeninae the anterolateral angles of the dorsal surface of the scutellum have marked depressions.
- Similarly in the Dinidorinae the posterolateral angles of the abdominal connexiva are smooth and appear nearly entire, whereas in the Megymeninae they are variously tuberculate or lobed.
- Furthermore, in most of the Dinidorinae the edge of the metasternum covers the spiracles of the second abdominal segment; in the Megymeninae those spiracles are visible from the exterior.
- The legs, and often the antennae, of Megymeninae generally are markedly spiny or setulose. In the Dinidorinae the legs are hardly spiny at all.

=== Tribes and genera ===
BioLib lists six tribes (and also the unplaced fossil genus †Dinidorites Cockerell, 1921) in the two subfamilies:

==== Dinidorinae ====
The Dinidorinae Stål, 1868 includes the Dinidorini, which comprises tens of species, some with four-segmented and some with five-segmented antennae.

tribe Amberianini J.A. Lis & Kocorek, 2014

- Amberiana Distant, 1911

tribe Dinidorini Stål, 1868

- Colpoproctus Stål, 1870
- Colporidius Lis, 1990
- Coridiellus Lis, 1990
- Coridius Illiger, 1807
- Cyclopelta Amyot & Serville, 1843
- Dinidor Latreille, 1829
- Patanocnema Karsch, 1892
- Sagriva Spinola, 1850

tribe Thalmini Nuamah, 1982

The tribe Thalmini contains three species, each in its own genus. All three species have two-segmented tarsi.

- Folengus Distant, 1914
- Thalma Walker, 1868
- Urusa Walker, 1868

==== Megymeninae ====
In the subfamily Megymeninae Amyot & Serville, 1843 the lateral margins of the abdomen and commonly also of the head and pronotum are produced into lobes, tubercles, or spines. In many species the pronotum bears a dorsal anteromedian tuberosity, or a posterior transverse ridge. In most species the legs are heavily and strongly spined; in others the antennae and legs are setulose.

tribe Byrsodepsini Kocorek & Lis, 2000

- Byrsodepsus Stål, 1872

tribe Eumenotini Bergroth, 1907

- Afromenotes Kment & Kocorek, 2014
- Eumenotes Westwood, 1847

tribe Megymenini Amyot & Serville, 1843

- Doesbergiana Durai, 1987 - monotypic D. borneoensis Durai, 1987
- Megymenum Guérin-Méneville, 1831 - several species with expanded pronotal margins and some have reduced hemelytra and are flightless. In most species the second valvifers are reduced, lightly sclerotized, and fused mesally.

Work continues in establishing the taxonomy of the family in the light of molecular genetics. Current evidence suggests that Dinidoridae is in fact monophyletic and is a sister group to the Tessaratomidae. However the monogeneric tribe Eumenotini, including only the monotypic genus Eumenotes Westwood, had been seen as belonging in the Megymeninae. This however no longer seems defensible. The tribe actually looks closer to the Dinidorinae, but whether it should be assigned to Dinidorinae or to its own subfamily needs separate consideration.

== Biology ==
All Dinidoridae appear subsist strictly on the sap of host plants in various families, more than twenty in number. Known hosts include members of the following families, on some of which some of the species are recognised as pests:

- Amaranthaceae
- Arecaceae
- Asclepiadaceae
- Asteraceae
- Balsaminaceae
- Convolvulaceae
- Cucurbitaceae
- Euphorbiaceae
- Fabaceae
- Malvaceae
- Moraceae
- Passifloraceae
- Pedaliaceae
- Poaceae
- Rubiaceae
- Rutaceae
- Sapindaceae
- Solanaceae
- Theaceae
- Urticaceae

== Distribution ==
Dinidoridae occur mainly in far-eastern and African regions, but the genus Dinidor occurs in neotropical regions and species of Megymenum extend down to Australia.
