= Bud =

Immature or embryonic shoot

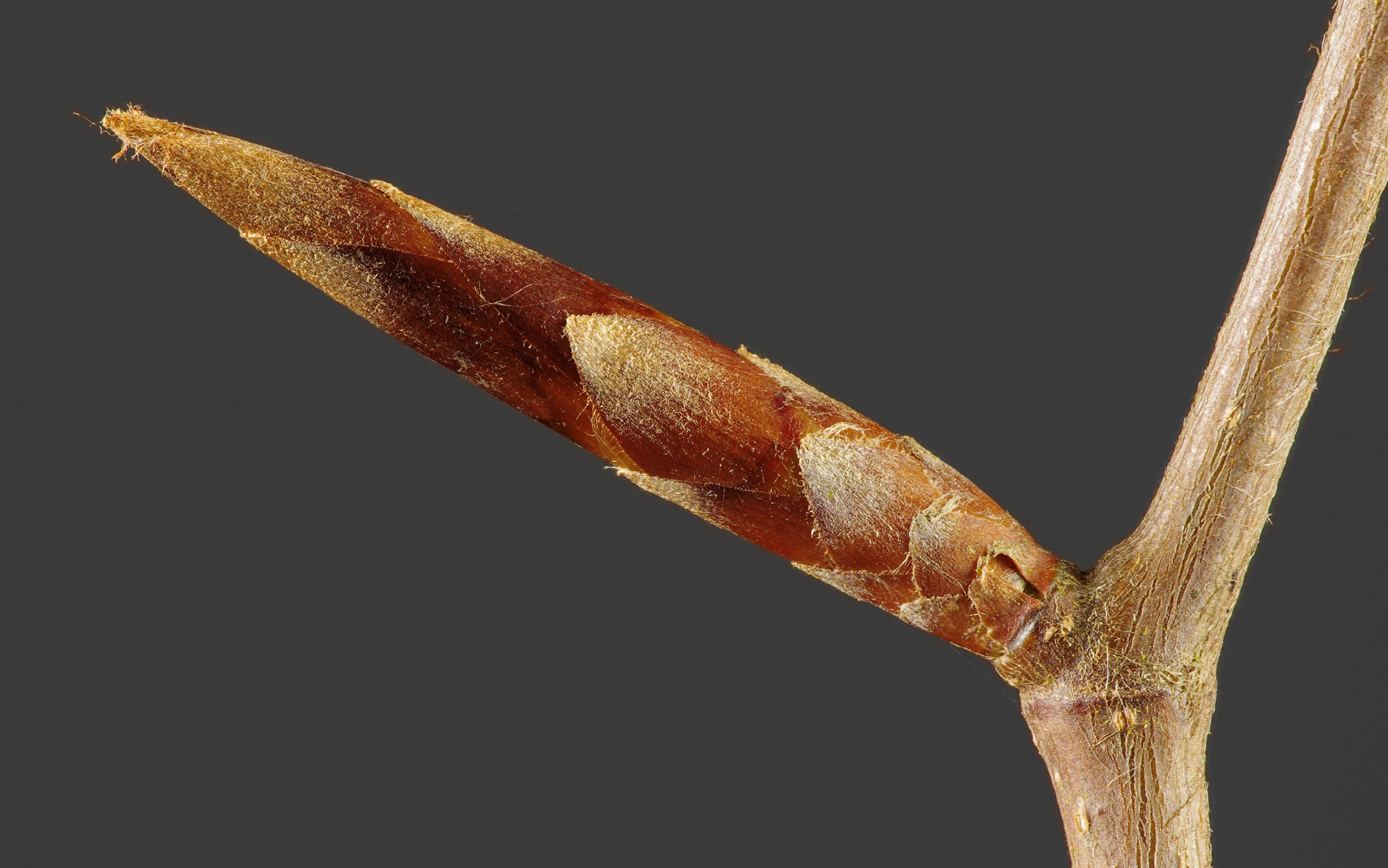
European beech (Fagus sylvatica) bud

In botany, a bud is an undeveloped or embryonic shoot and normally occurs in the axil of a leaf or at the tip of a stem. Once formed, a bud may remain for some time in a dormant condition, or it may form a shoot immediately. Buds may be specialized to develop flowers or short shoots or may have the potential for general shoot development. The term bud is also used in zoology, where it refers to an outgrowth from the body which can develop into a new individual.

== Overview ==
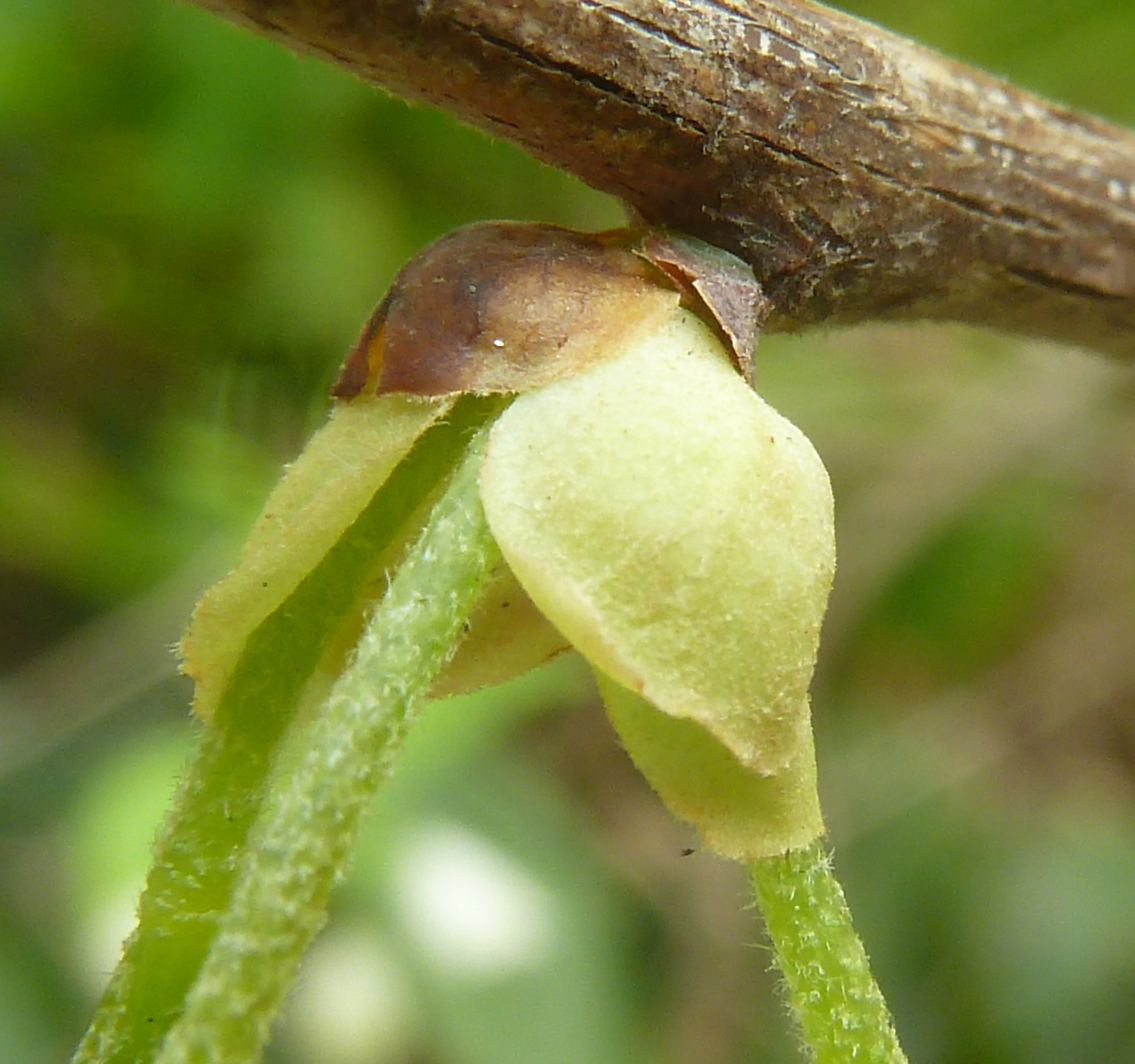
Inflorescence bud scales in Halesia carolina

The buds of many woody plants, especially in temperate or cold climates, are protected by a covering of modified leaves called scales which tightly enclose the more delicate parts of the bud. Many bud scales are covered by a gummy substance which serves as added protection. When the bud develops, the scales may enlarge somewhat but usually just drop off, leaving a series of horizontally-elongated scars on the surface of the growing stem. By means of these scars one can determine the age of any young branch, since each year's growth ends in the formation of a bud, the formation of which produces an additional group of bud scale scars. Continued growth of the branch causes these scars to be obliterated after a few years so that the total age of older branches cannot be determined by this means.

In many plants, scales do not form over the bud, and the bud is then called a naked bud. The minute underdeveloped leaves in such buds are often excessively hairy. Naked buds are found in some shrubs, like some species of the Sumac and Viburnums (Viburnum alnifolium and V. lantana) and in herbaceous plants. In many of the latter, buds are even more reduced, often consisting of undifferentiated masses of cells in the axils of leaves. A terminal bud occurs on the end of a stem and lateral buds are found on the side. A head of cabbage (see Brassica) is an exceptionally large terminal bud, while Brussels sprouts are large lateral buds.

Since buds are formed in the axils of leaves, their distribution on the stem is the same as that of leaves. There are alternate, opposite, and whorled buds, as well as the terminal bud at the tip of the stem. In many plants buds appear in unexpected places: these are known as adventitious buds.

Often it is possible to find a bud in a remarkable series of gradations of bud scales. In the buckeye, for example, one may see a complete gradation from the small brown outer scale through larger scales which on unfolding become somewhat green to the inner scales of the bud, which are remarkably leaf-like. Such a series suggests that the scales of the bud are in truth leaves, modified to protect the more delicate parts of the plant during unfavorable periods.

== Types of buds ==
Plant buds classification

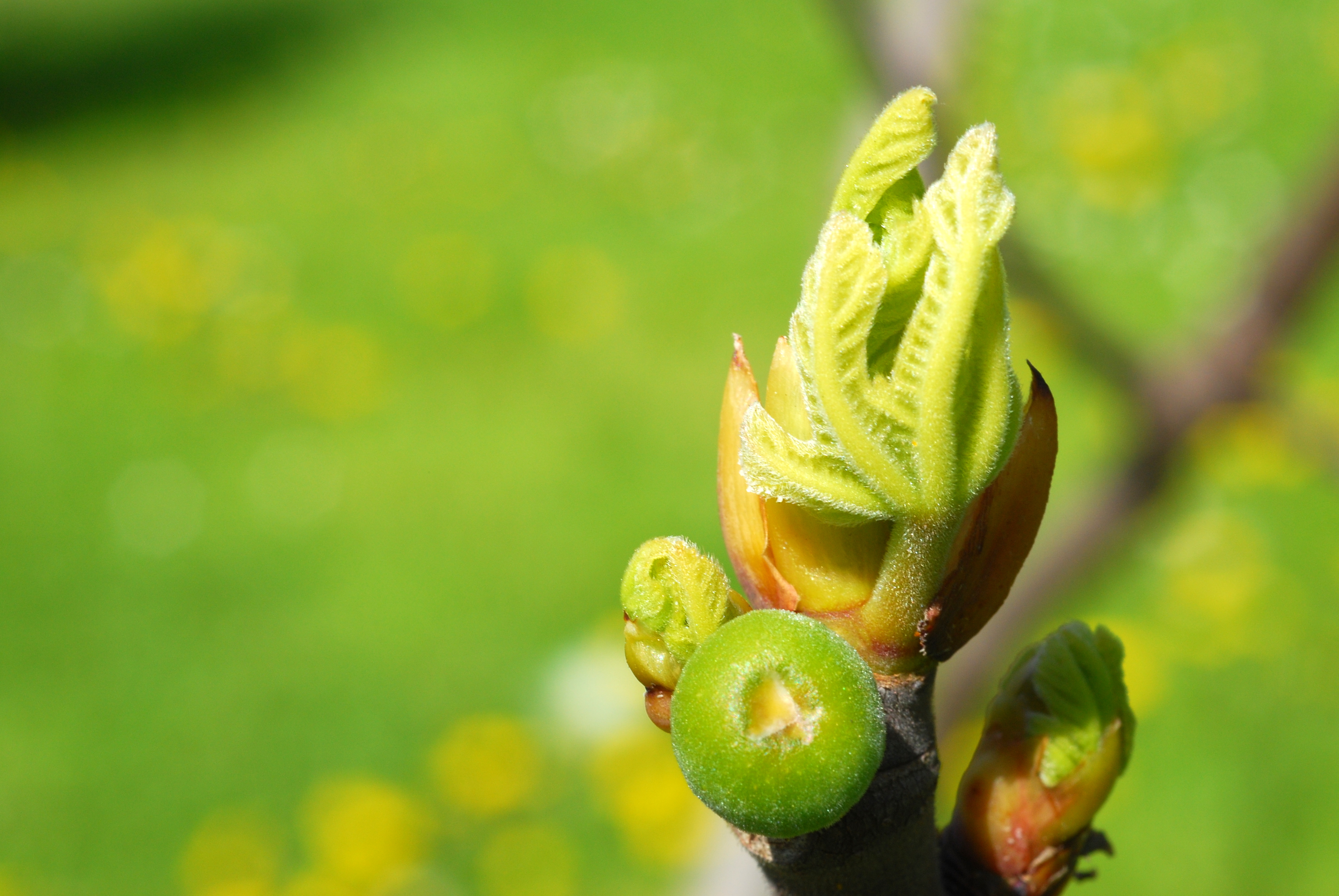
Terminal, vegetative bud of Ficus carica

Buds are often useful in the identification of plants, especially for woody plants in winter when leaves have fallen. Buds may be classified and described according to different criteria: location, status, morphology, and function.

Botanists commonly use the following terms:

- for location:
  - terminal, when located at the tip of a stem (apical is equivalent but rather reserved for the one at the top of the plant);
  - axillary, when located in the axil of a leaf (lateral is the equivalent but some adventitious buds may be lateral too);
  - adventitious, when located elsewhere, for example on the trunk or roots (some adventitious buds may be former axillary ones that are reduced and hidden under the bark, while other adventitious buds are completely new formed ones).
- for status:
  - accessory, for secondary buds formed besides a principal bud (axillary or terminal);
  - resting, for a bud that forms at the end of a growth season, and then lies dormant until the onset of the next growth season;
  - dormant or latent, for buds whose growth has been delayed for a rather long time. The term is usable as a synonym of resting, but is better employed for buds waiting undeveloped for years, for example epicormic buds;
  - pseudoterminal, for an axillary bud taking over the function of a terminal bud (characteristic of species whose growth is sympodial: terminal bud dies and is replaced by the closer axillary bud, for examples beech, persimmon, Platanus have sympodial growth).
- for morphology:
  - scaly or covered (perulate), when scales, also referred to as a perule (lat. perula, perulaei) (which are in fact transformed and reduced leaves) cover and protect the embryonic parts;
  - naked, when not covered by scales;
  - hairy, when also protected by hairs (it may apply either to scaly or to naked buds).
- for function:
  - vegetative, only containing vegetative structures: a leaf bud is an embryonic shoot containing leaves;
  - reproductive, only containing embryonic flower(s): a flower bud contains a single flower while an inflorescence bud contains an inflorescence;
  - mixed, containing both embryonic leaves and flower(s).

=== Image gallery ===
Buds

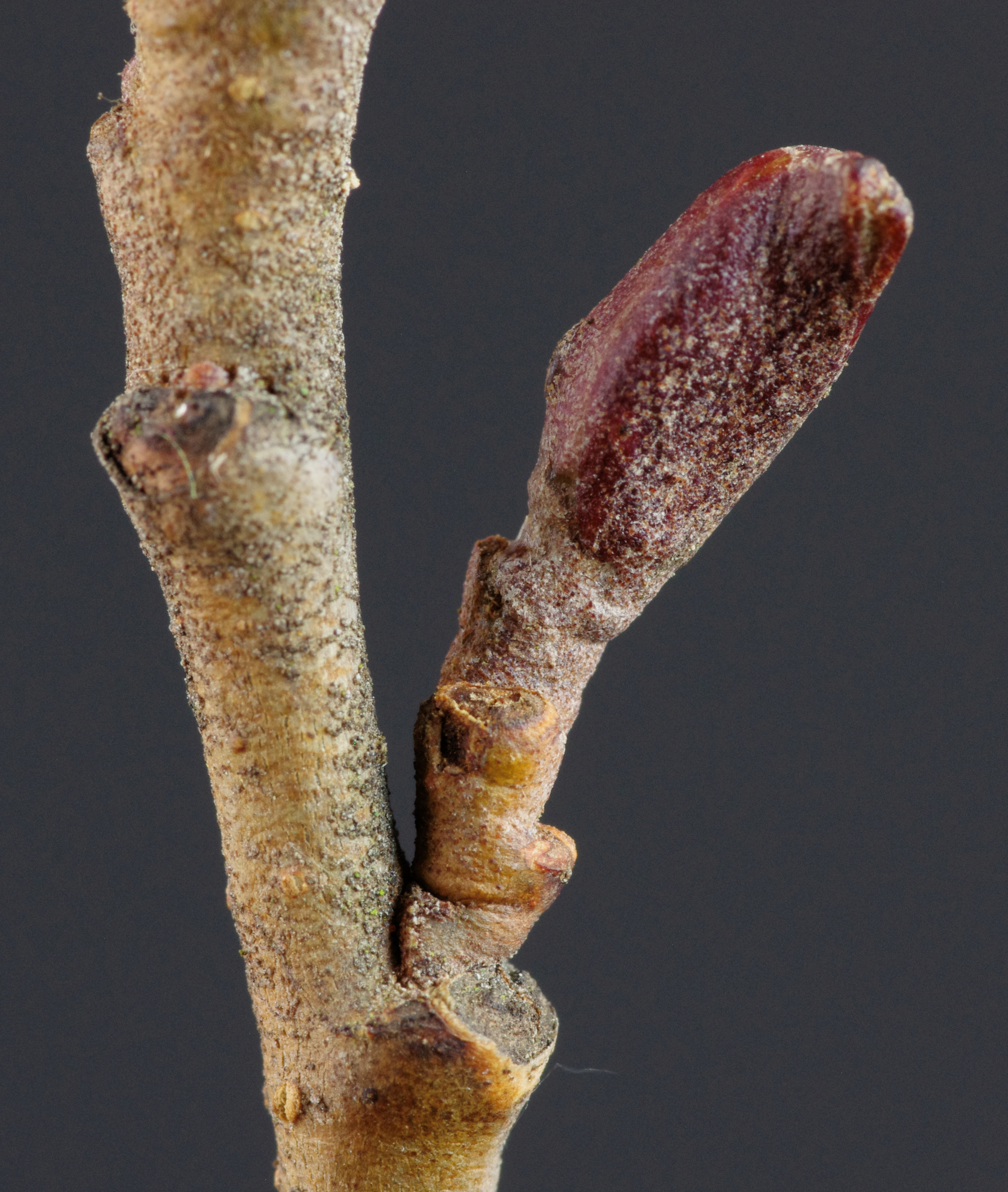
Alnus glutinosa bud

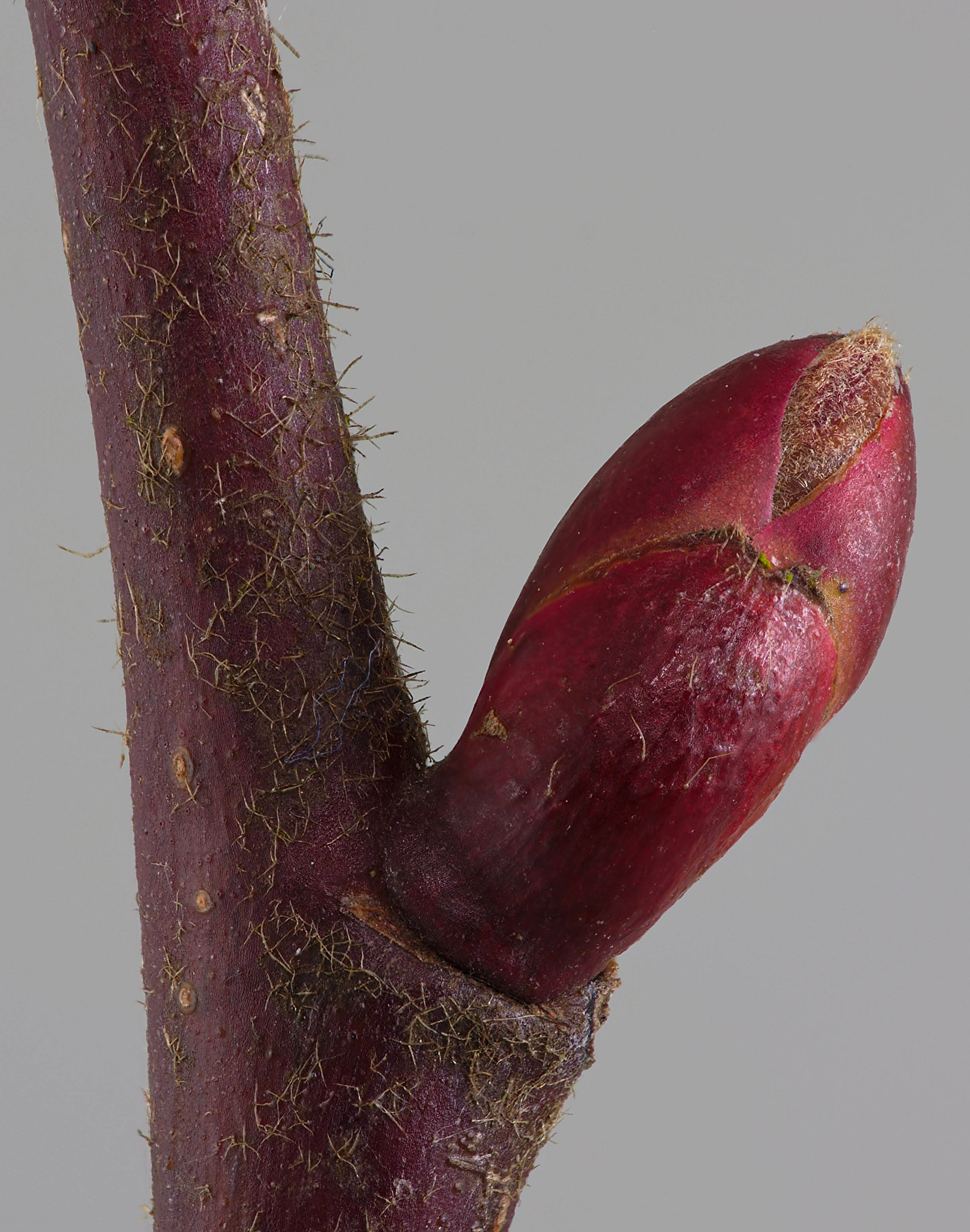
Tilia bud

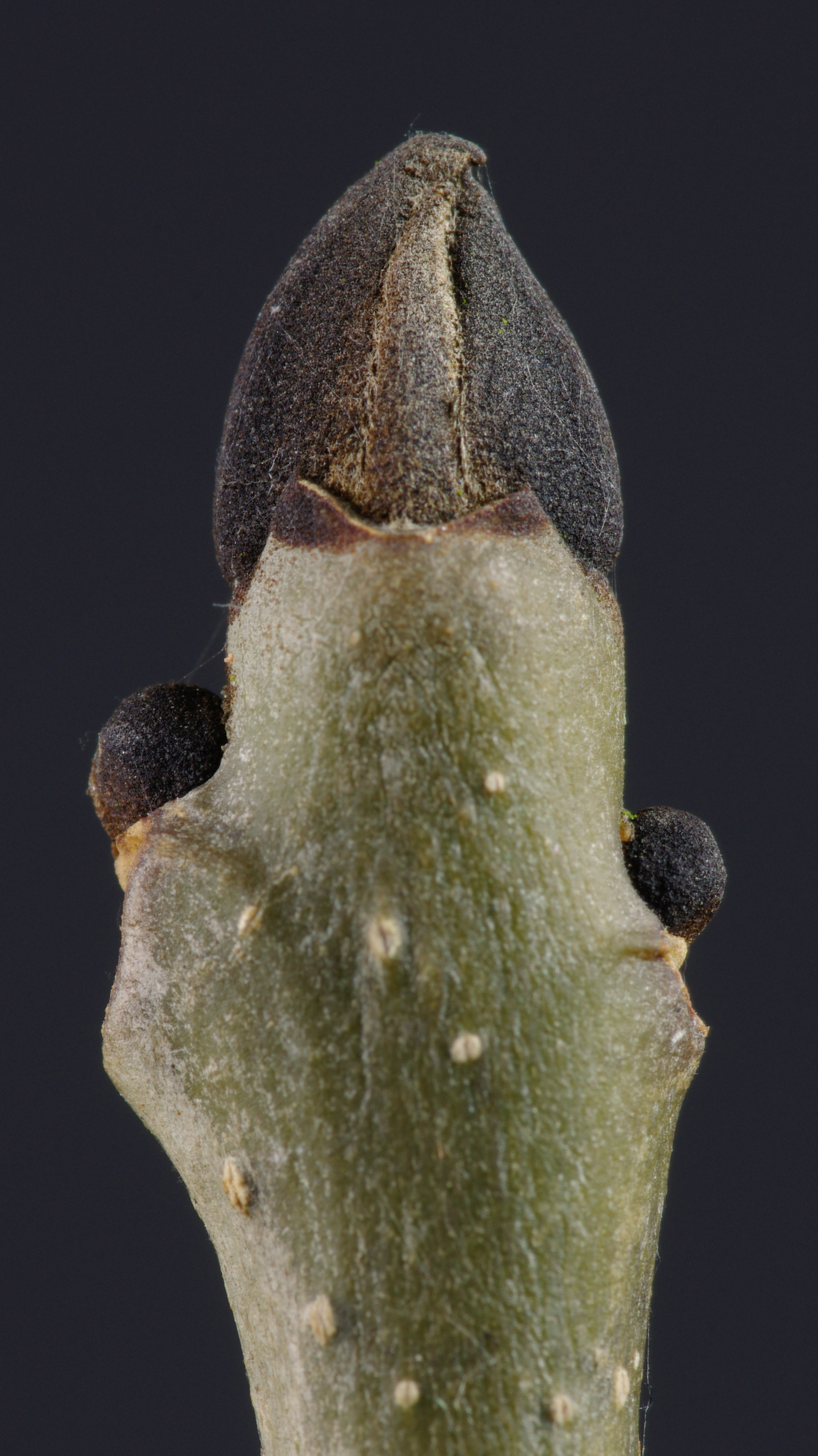
Black buds of a European ash, Fraxinus excelsior

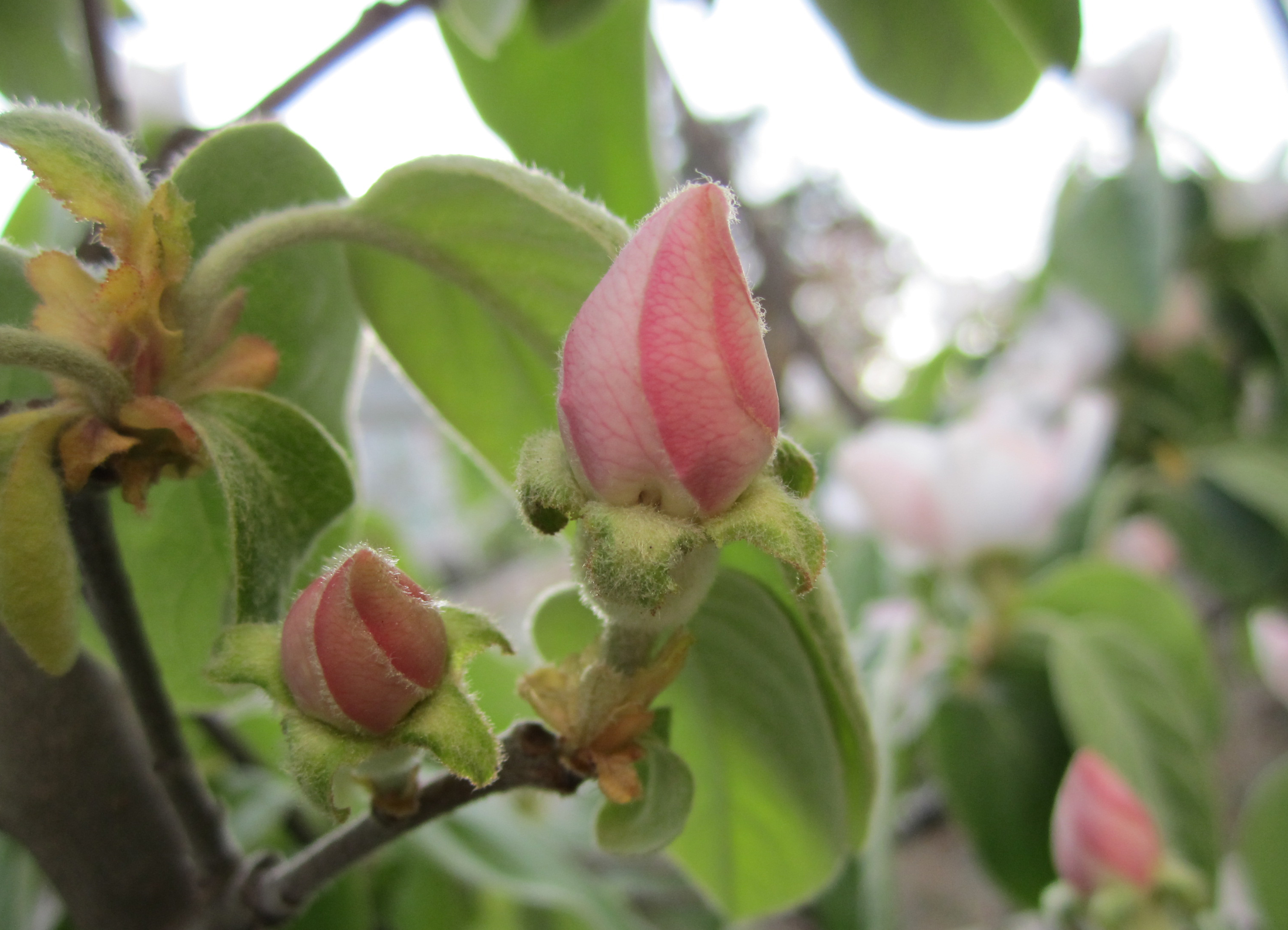
A quince's flower bud with spirally folded petals

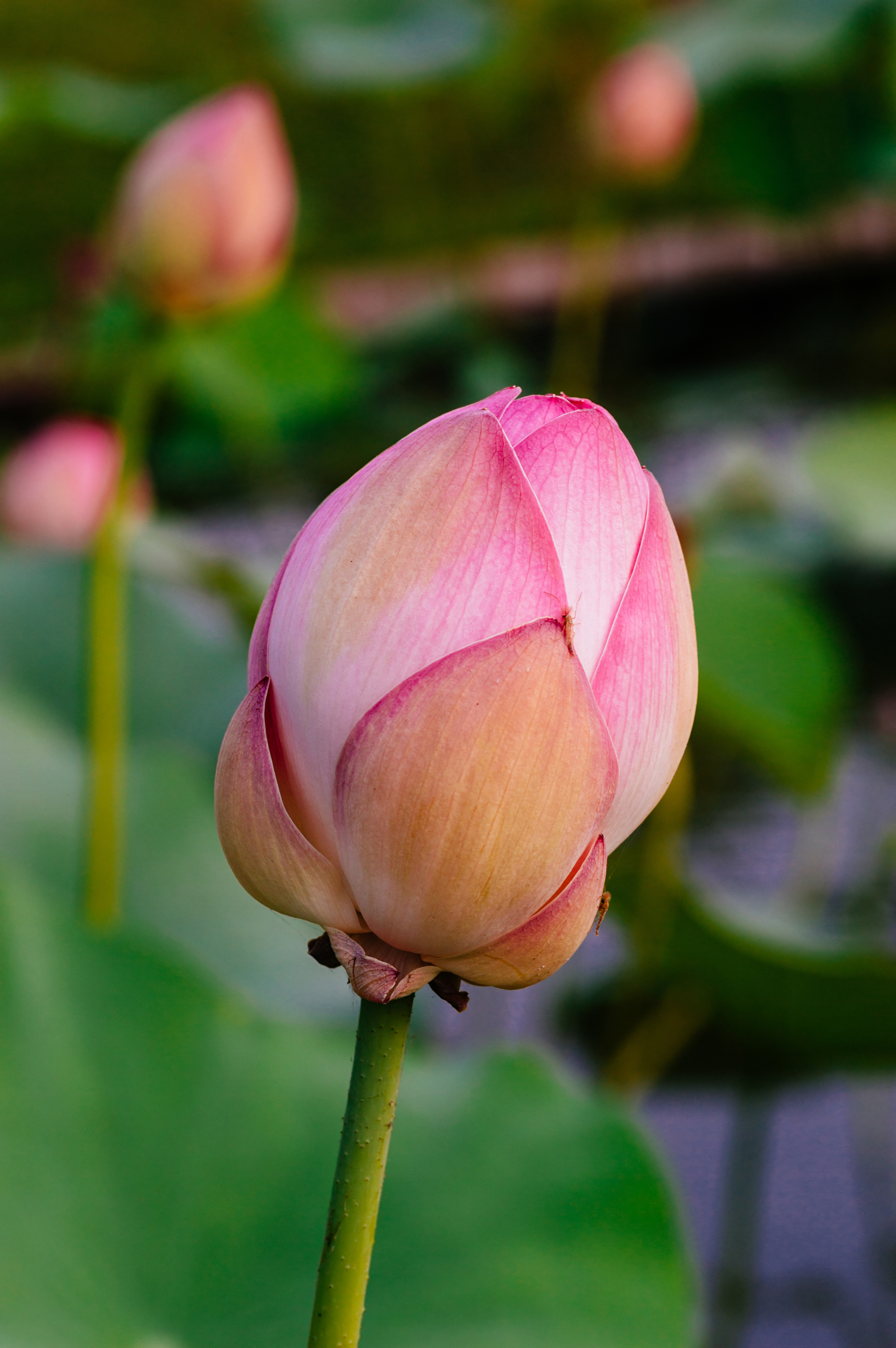
Opening Nelumbo flower bud

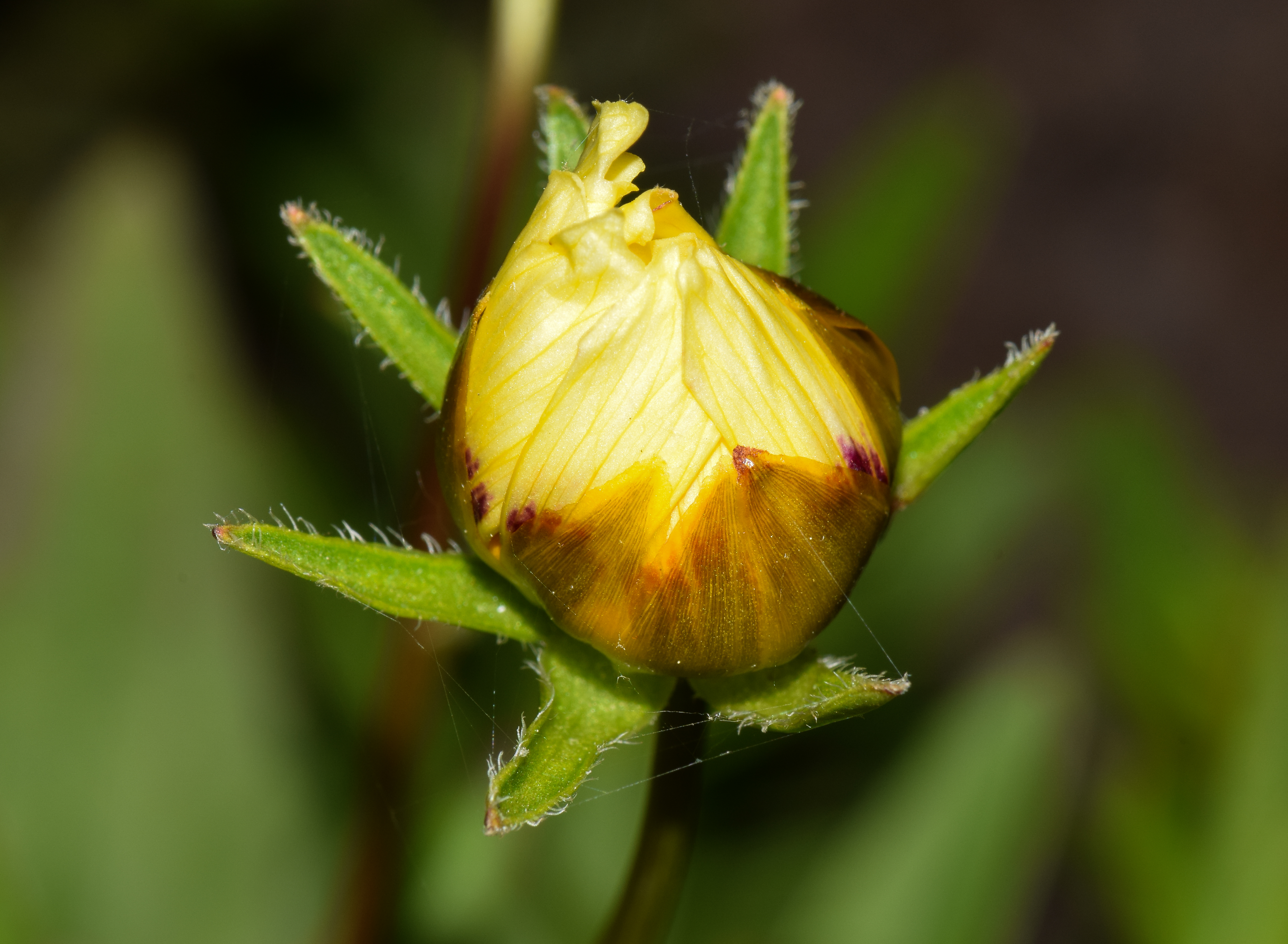
Opening Coreopsis tinctoria flower buds

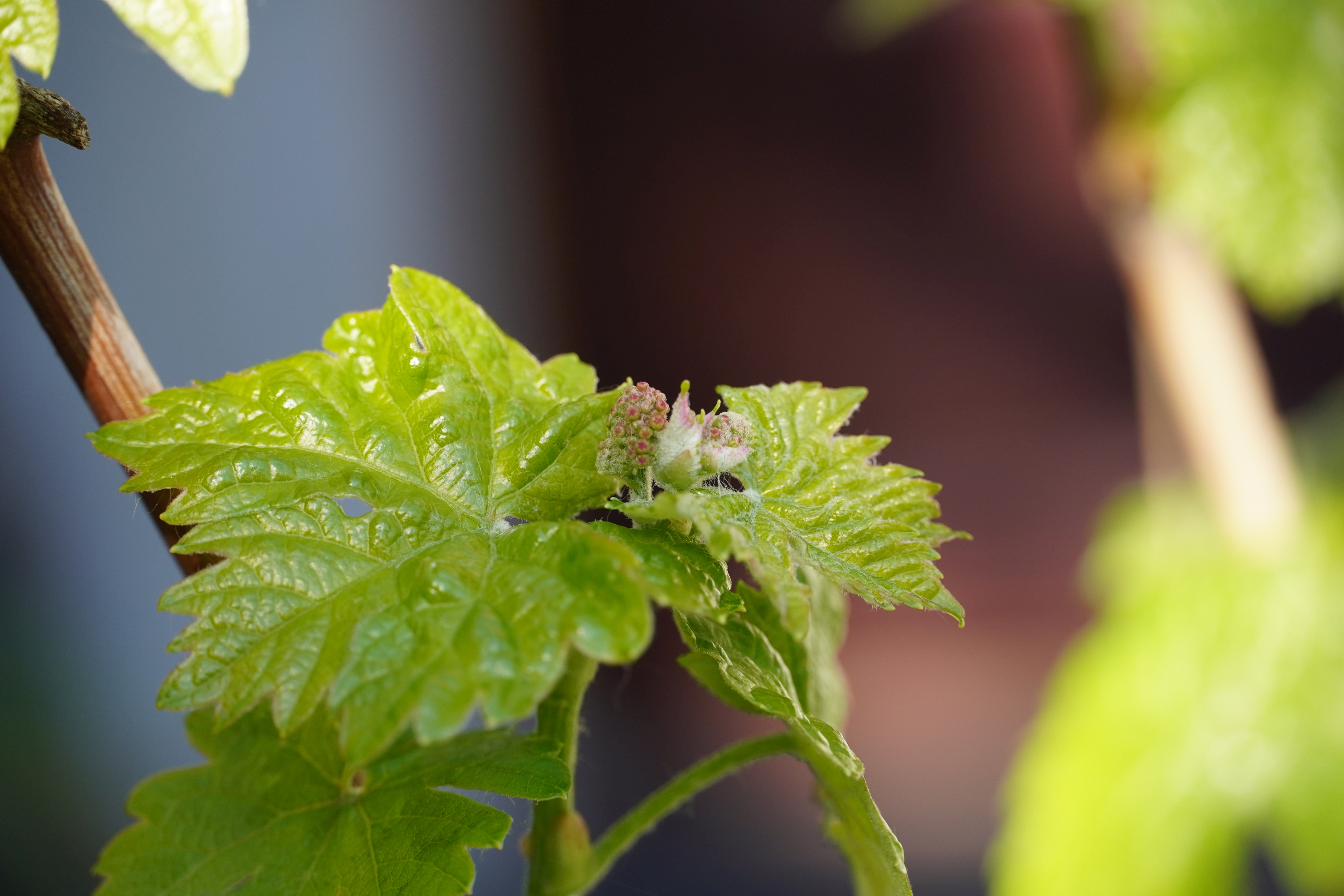
Vitis vinifera flower buds

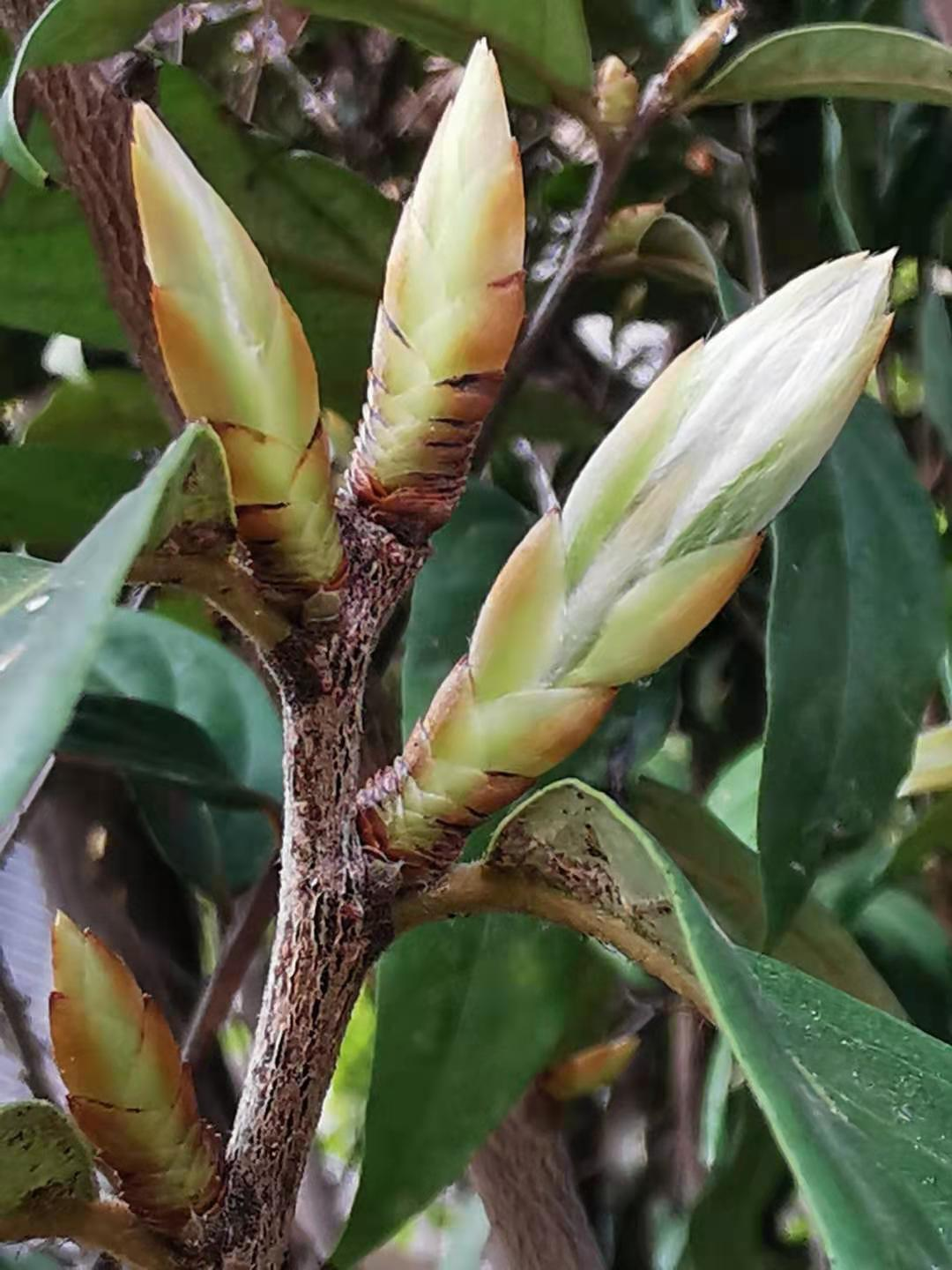
Diospyros eriantha bud

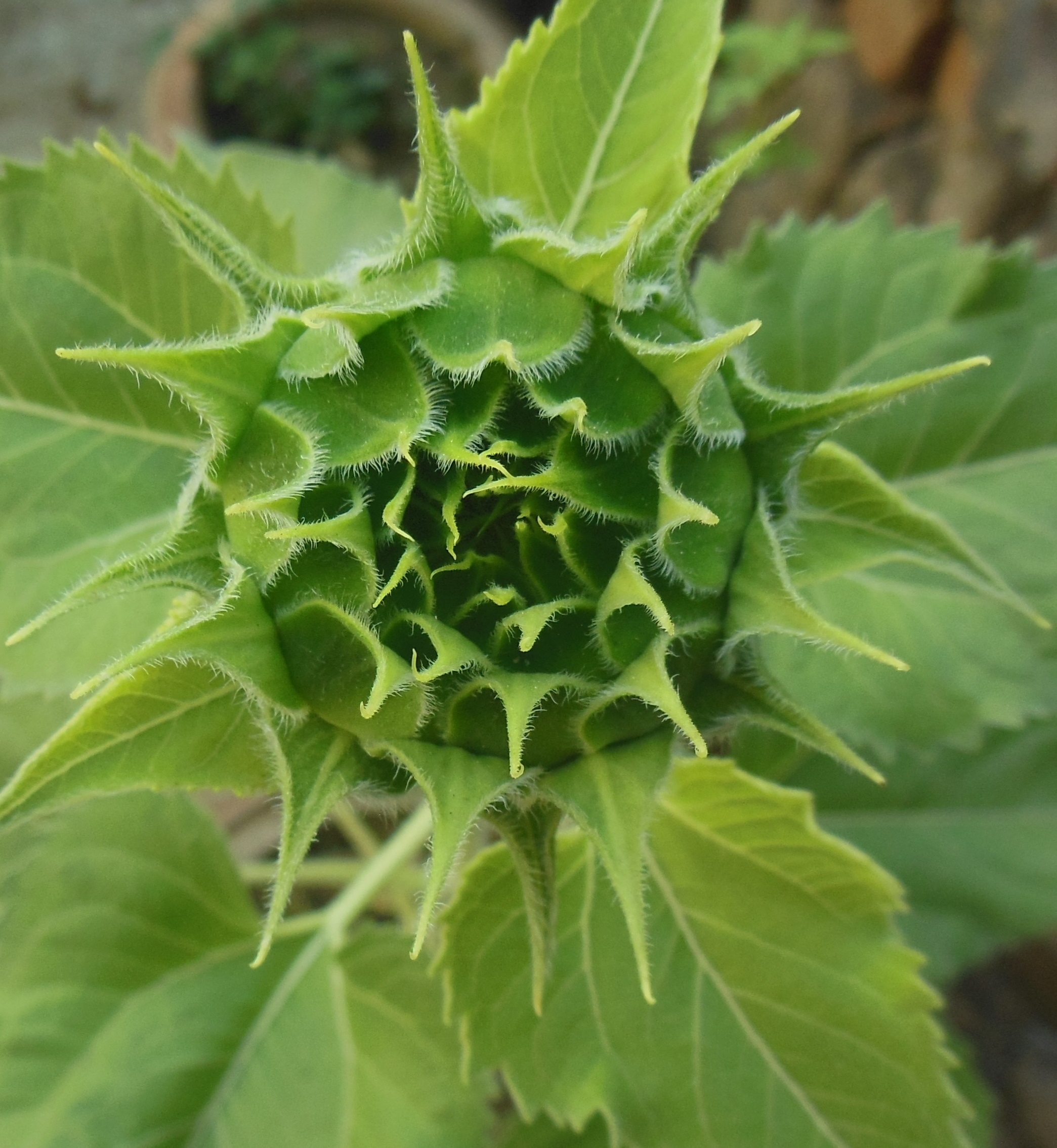
Inflorescence bud of the common sunflower (Helianthus annuus)

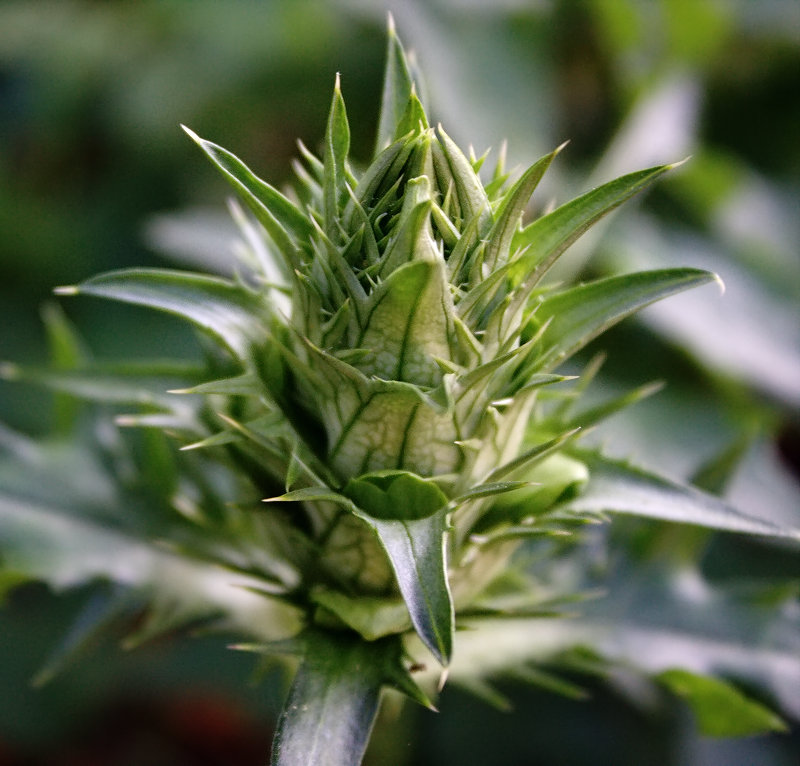
Inflorescence bud of Acanthus balcanicus

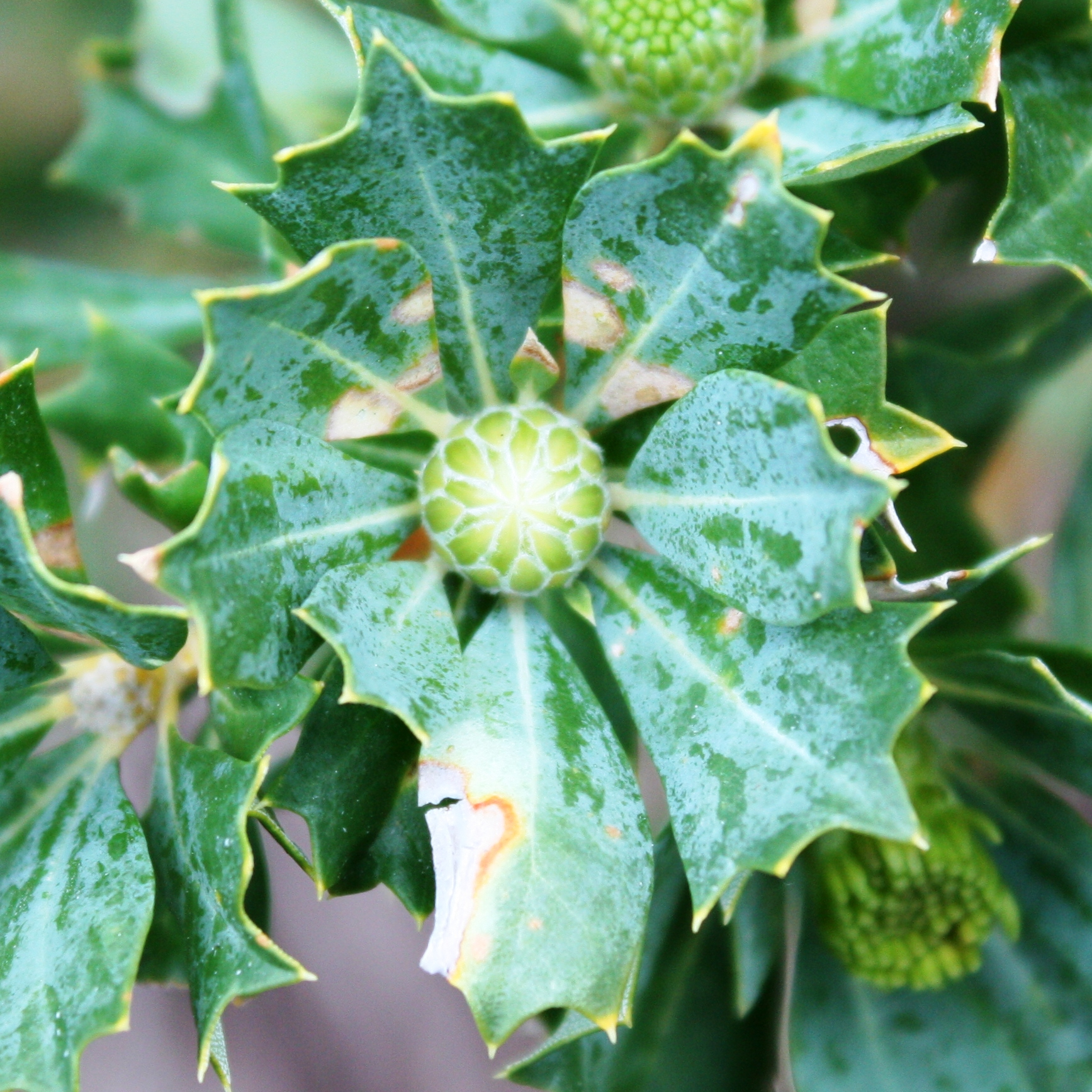
Inflorescence bud of the parrot bush (Banksia sessilis)

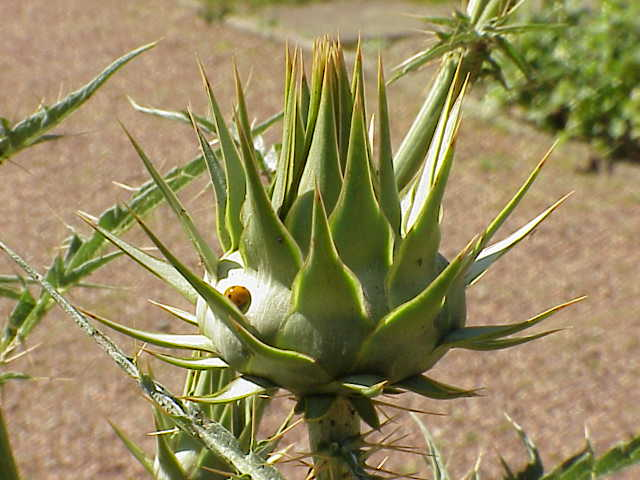
Inflorescence bud of cardoon (Cynara cardunculus)

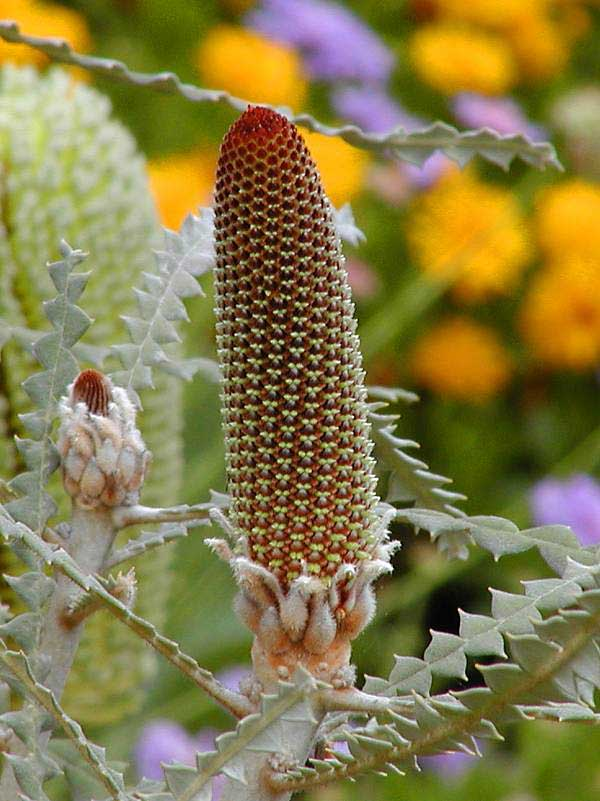
An opening inflorescence bud at left, which will develop like the one to its right
