= Eurygaster shoshone =

Scientific classification
- Domain: Eukaryota
- Kingdom: Animalia
- Phylum: Arthropoda
- Class: Insecta
- Order: Hemiptera
- Suborder: Heteroptera
- Family: Scutelleridae
- Genus: Eurygaster
- Species: E. shoshone

Binomial name
- Eurygaster shoshone Kirkaldy, 1909

Species of true bug

Eurygaster shoshone is a species of shield-backed bug in the family Scutelleridae. It is found in North America.
