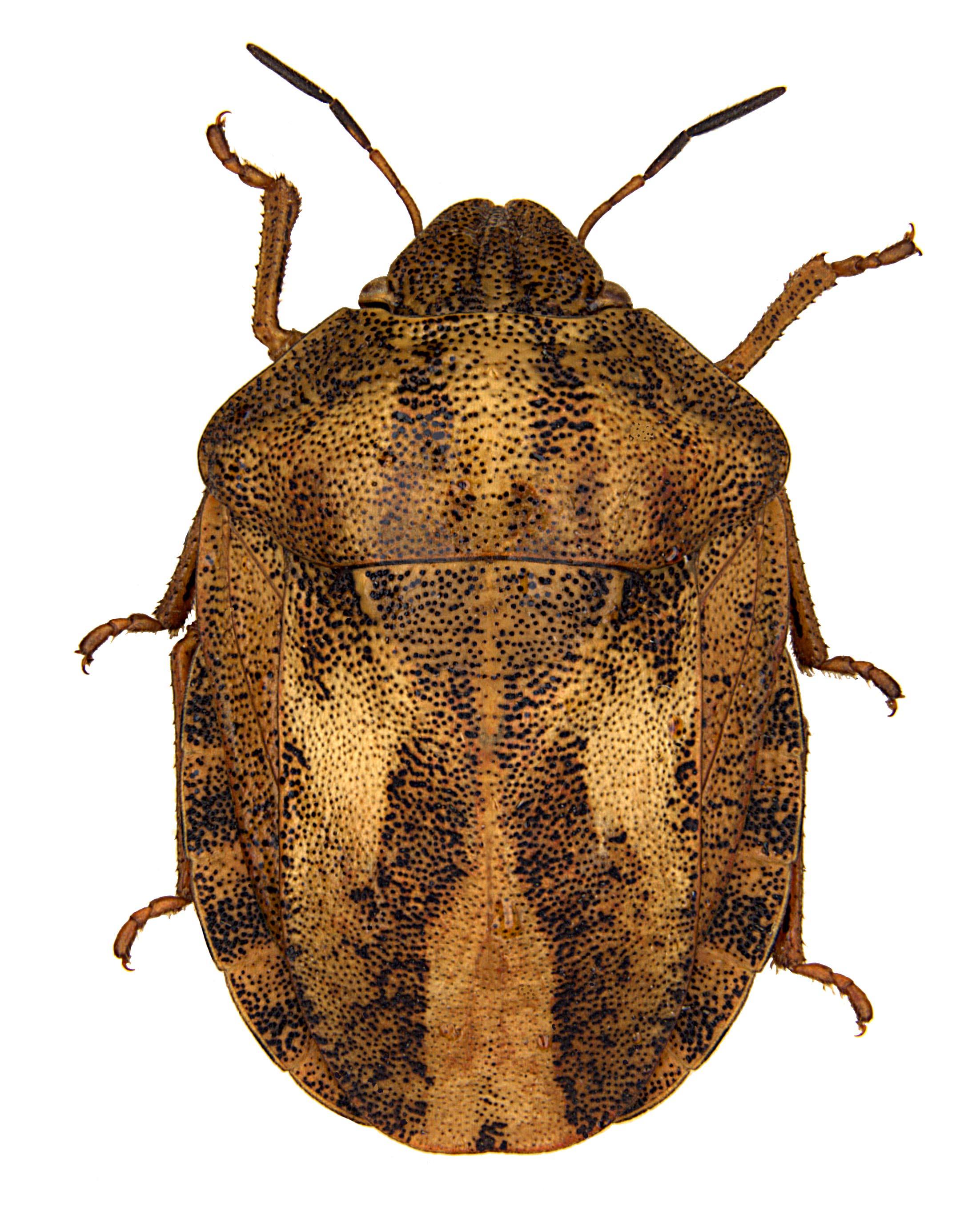

Scientific classification
- Domain: Eukaryota
- Kingdom: Animalia
- Phylum: Arthropoda
- Class: Insecta
- Order: Hemiptera
- Suborder: Heteroptera
- Family: Scutelleridae
- Genus: Eurygaster
- Species: E. testudinaria

Binomial name
- Eurygaster testudinaria (Geoffroy, 1785)

= Eurygaster testudinaria =

Species of true bug

Eurygaster testudinaria is a Palearctic shieldbug. It occurs in Europe from the Northern Mediterranean to southern Scandinavia, and East through Central Asia to northern China and Japan.

This species is very difficult to differentiate from Eurygaster maura but testudinaria has a slight central depression at the front of the head. Its colour similarly varies.

Eurygaster testudinaria feeds on Poaceae (grasses).
