= Eurygaster alternata =

Scientific classification
- Domain: Eukaryota
- Kingdom: Animalia
- Phylum: Arthropoda
- Class: Insecta
- Order: Hemiptera
- Suborder: Heteroptera
- Family: Scutelleridae
- Genus: Eurygaster
- Species: E. alternata

Binomial name
- Eurygaster alternata (Say, 1828)

Species of true bug

Eurygaster alternata is a species of shield-backed bug in the family Scutelleridae. It is found in North America.
