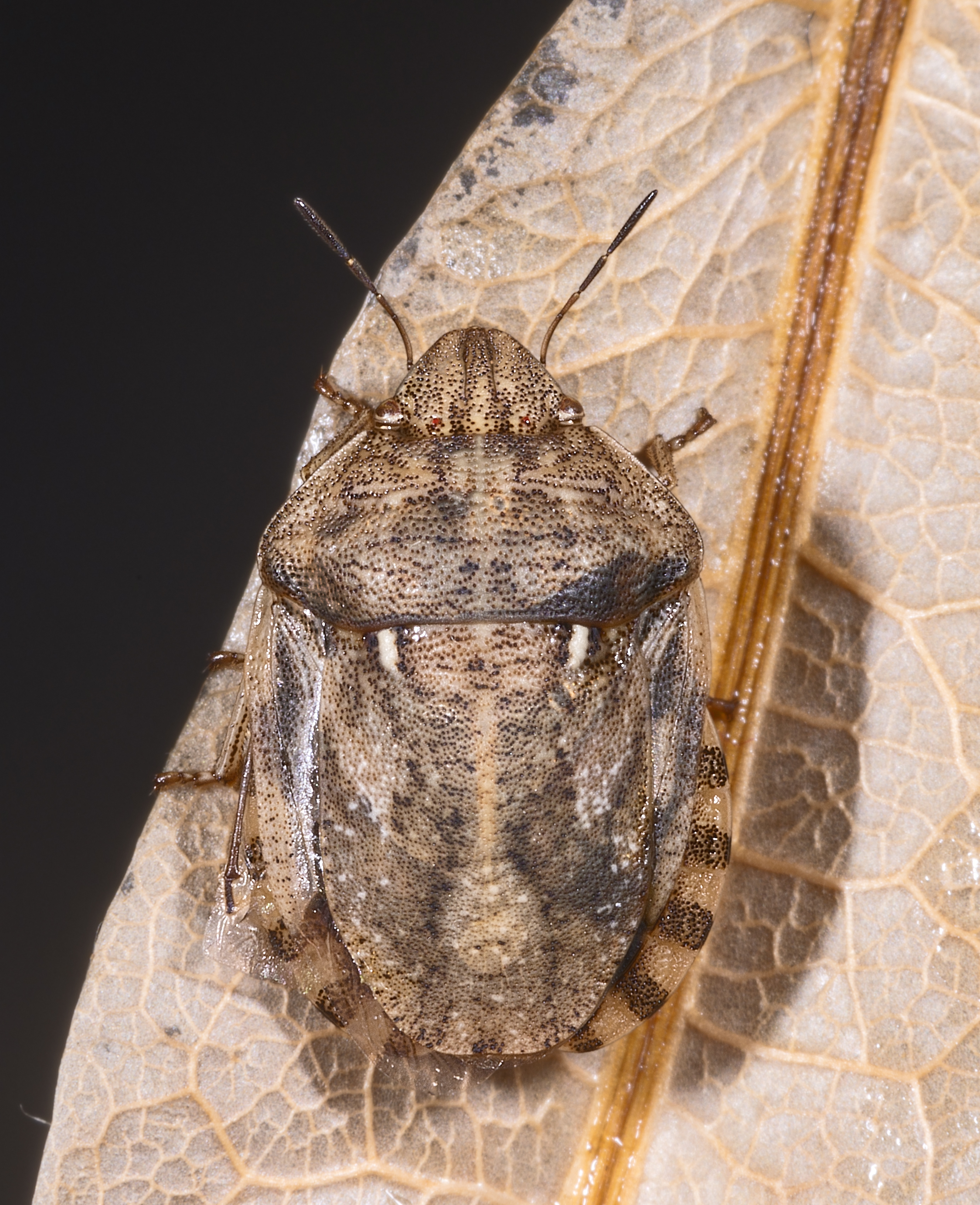
- Eurygaster maura, adult

Scientific classification
- Domain: Eukaryota
- Kingdom: Animalia
- Phylum: Arthropoda
- Class: Insecta
- Order: Hemiptera
- Suborder: Heteroptera
- Family: Scutelleridae
- Subfamily: Eurygastrinae
- Tribe: Eurygastrini
- Genus: Eurygaster; Laporte, 1832

Species
- See text

= Eurygaster =

Genus of true bugs

Eurygaster is a genus of shield bugs, typical of the subfamily Eurygastrinae and tribe Eurygastrini, widespread in Eurasia, with some species in North America. At least two species are considered economically important sunn pests.

== Species ==
The following are included in BioLib.cz:

1. Eurygaster alternata (Say, 1828)
2. Eurygaster amerinda Bliven, 1956
3. Eurygaster austriaca (Schrank, 1776)
  1. E. austriaca austriaca (Schrank, 1776)
  2. E. austriaca seabrai China, 1938
4. Eurygaster chinai Lodos, 1963
5. Eurygaster dilaticollis Dohrn, 1860
6. Eurygaster fokkeri Puton, 1893
7. Eurygaster hottentotta (Fabricius, 1775)
8. Eurygaster integriceps Puton, 1881 - major sunn pest
9. Eurygaster laeviuscula Jakovlev, 1886
10. Eurygaster maura (Linnaeus, 1758)
11. Eurygaster minidoka Bliven, 1956
12. Eurygaster paderewskii Bliven, 1962
13. Eurygaster schreiberi Montandon, 1885
14. Eurygaster shoshone Kirkaldy, 1909
15. Eurygaster testudinaria (Geoffroy, 1785) - tortoise shieldbug
16. †Eurygaster granulosus Förster, 1891

=== Species in Europe ===
- E. austriaca (Schrank, 1776)
- E. dilaticollis Dohrn, 1860
- E. fokkeri Puton, 1893
- E. hottentotta (Fabricius, 1775)
- E. integriceps Puton, 1881
- E. maura (Linnaeus, 1758)
- E. minor Montandon, 1885
- E. testudinaria (Geoffroy, 1785)
