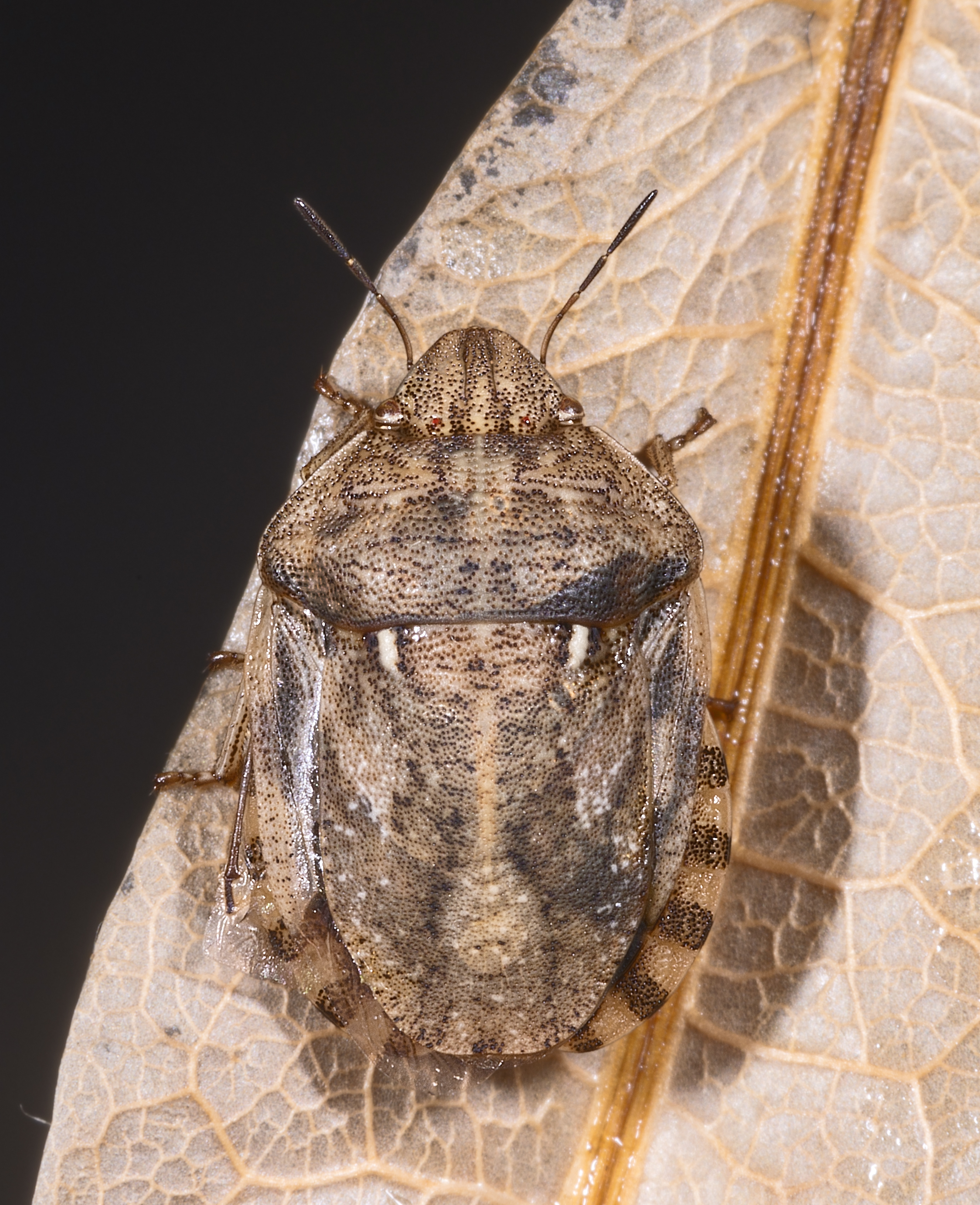
- Eurygaster maura, adult

Scientific classification
- Kingdom: Animalia
- Phylum: Arthropoda
- Clade: Pancrustacea
- Class: Insecta
- Order: Hemiptera
- Suborder: Heteroptera
- Family: Scutelleridae
- Subfamily: Eurygastrinae
- Tribe: Eurygastrini
- Genus: Eurygaster
- Species: E. maura

Binomial name
- Eurygaster maura (Linnaeus, 1758)

Synonyms
- List: Cimex cinereus Goeze, 1778; Cimex maurus Linnaeus, 1758; Eurygaster minor Montandon, 1885; Tetyra picta Fabricius, 1803; Thyreocoris austriacus Schrank, 1801

= Eurygaster maura =

Species of insect (tortoise bug)

Eurygaster maura, also known as tortoise bug, is a species of true bugs or shield-backed bugs belonging to the family Scutelleridae.

== Distribution ==
This species is widespread in Europe, but also in large parts of Asia and North America.

== Habitat ==
Their habitats are calcareous grasslands with wild grasses.

== Description ==
Eurygaster maura can reach a length of 8–11 millimetres (0.31–0.43 in). The body is oval and slightly convex and the head is triangular and smoothly rounded, with a small pair of compound eyes. The pronotum has slightly protruding hind corners. The scutellum covers the wings and the whole abdomen. The ground color is mostly brown, but can be light gray or also black.

This species is rather similar to Eurygaster testudinaria, but it is slightly smaller and smoothly rounded, with less protruding hind corner.

== Biology ==
Eurygaster maura is a univoltine species. These shield-backed bugs can be found from May to August, becoming adult from July. The females lay their eggs in the spring in small packages on the underside of the leaves surface. After a few weeks the eggs hatch the young nymphs. After five molts, they are fully developed and ready to overwinter in leaf litter.

E. maura is a sunn pest - both the adults and their larvae are very harmful to crops. They feed on various grasses and grain plants (wheat, rye, barley and sometimes oats, corn and millet). Blandino et al 2015 find the Mixolab test to provide accurate data about the effects of E. maura damage, insecticide application, fungal pathogens vectored by the pest, and fungicide application, on both common wheat and durum.

== Gallery ==
Life cycle:
1: Wintering imago
2: Egg layering in spring
3: Flight for cereals
4: Feeding
5: Symptoms of damages
6: Pupation and new generation overwintering
7: Herb feeding on wintering place

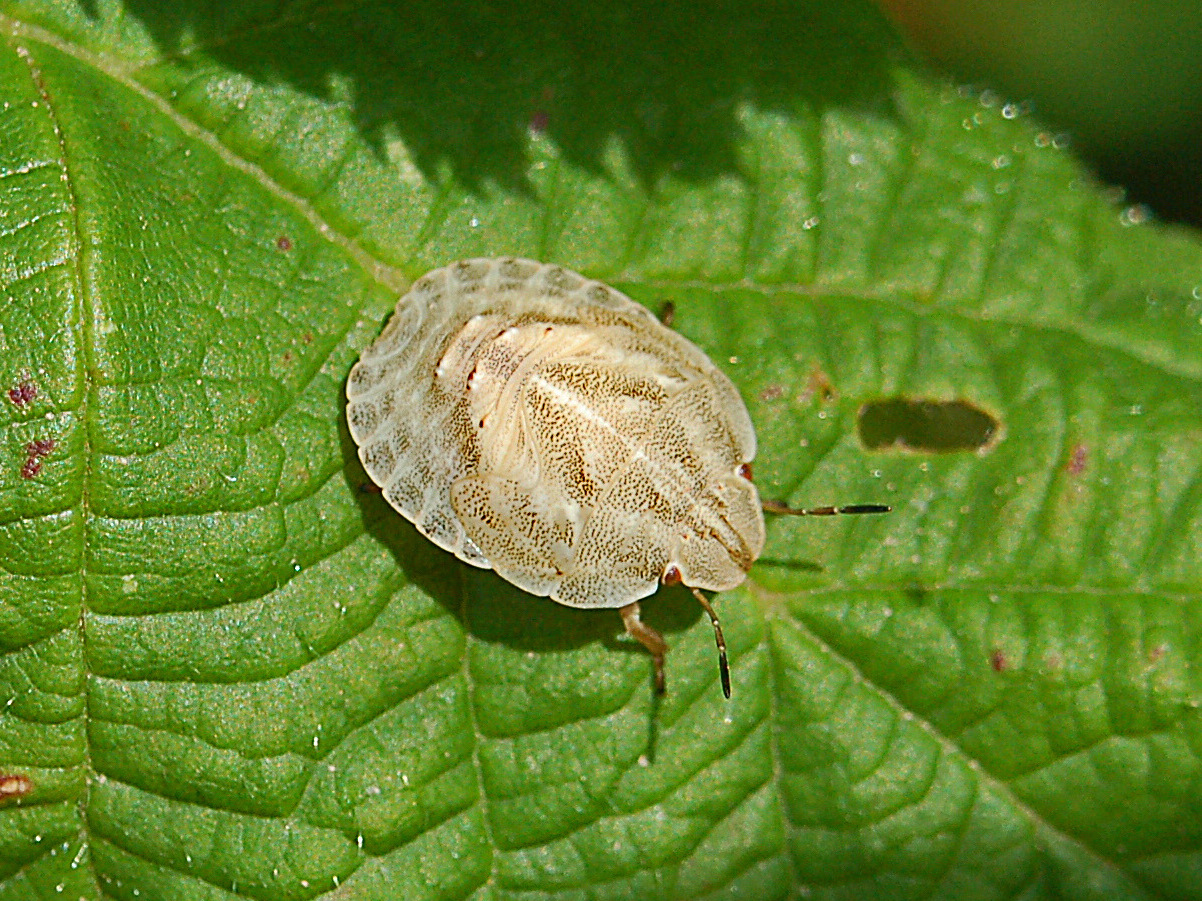
Early nymph

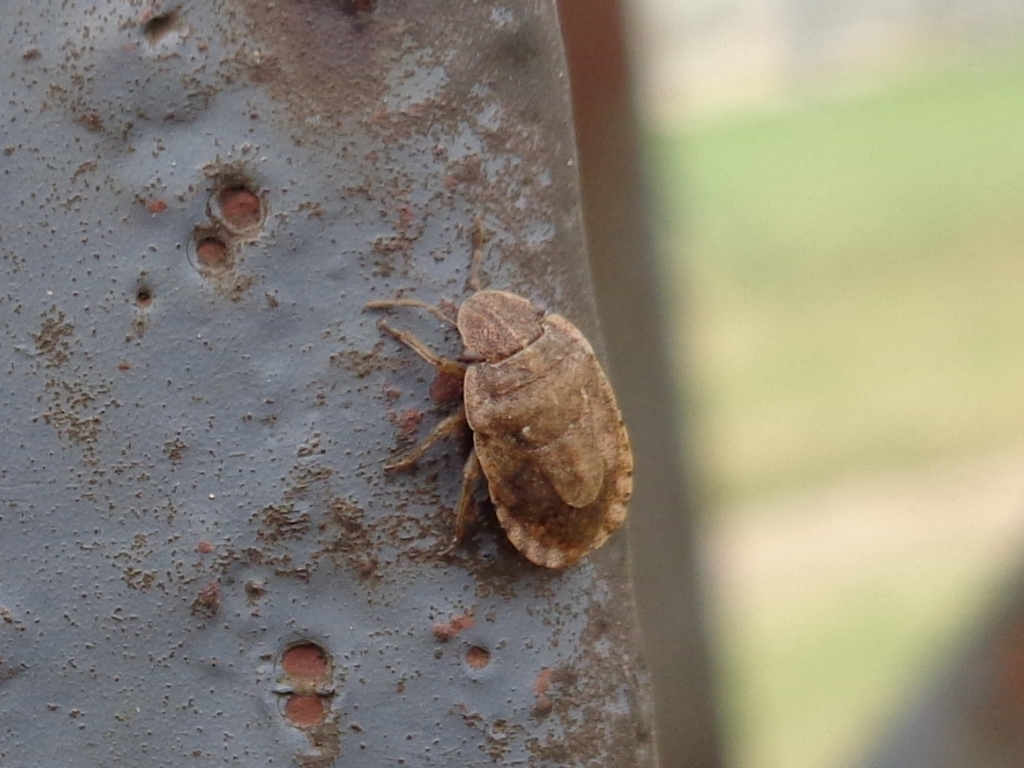
Late stage nymph

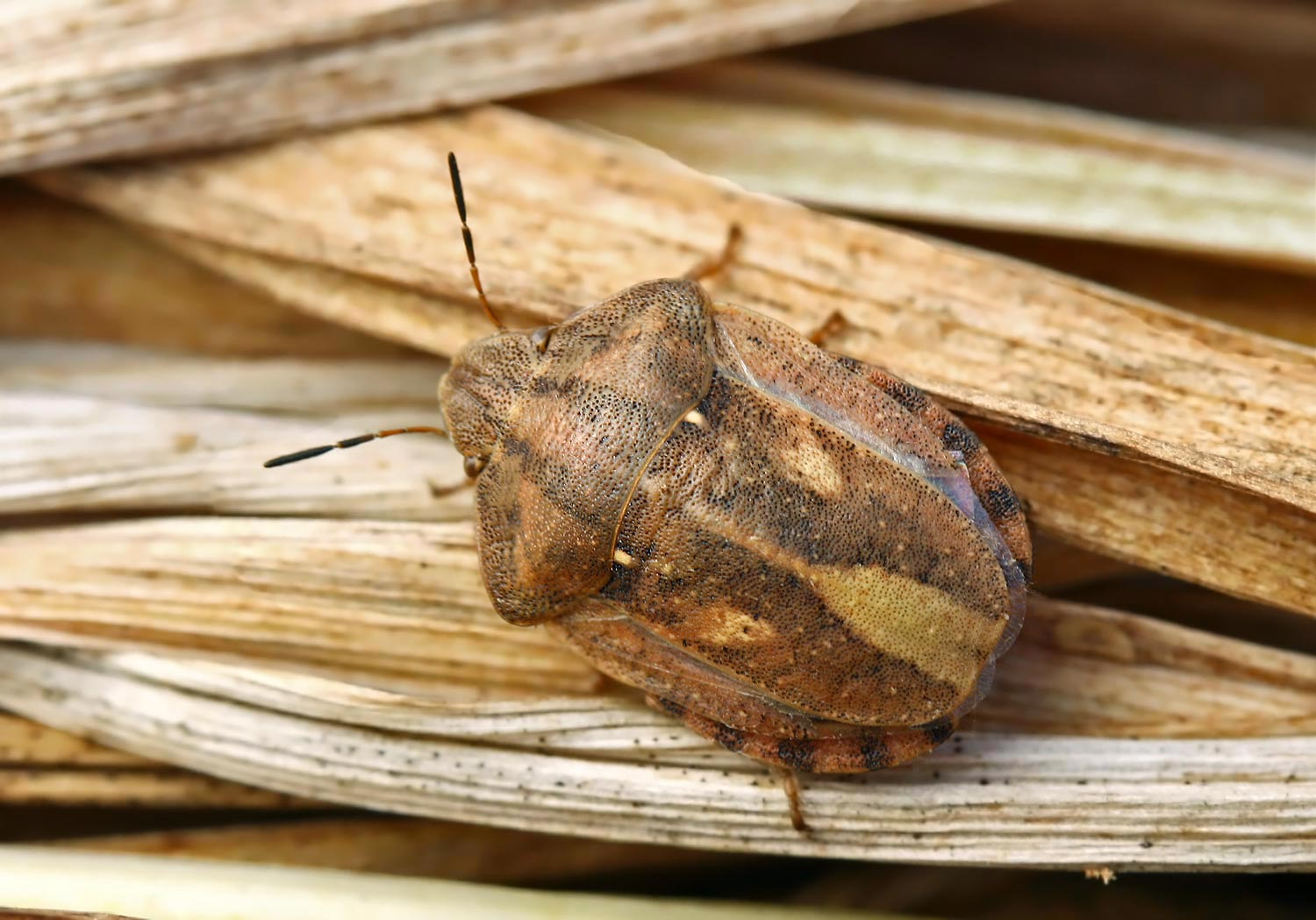
Imago

== See also ==
- List of shield bug species of Great Britain
