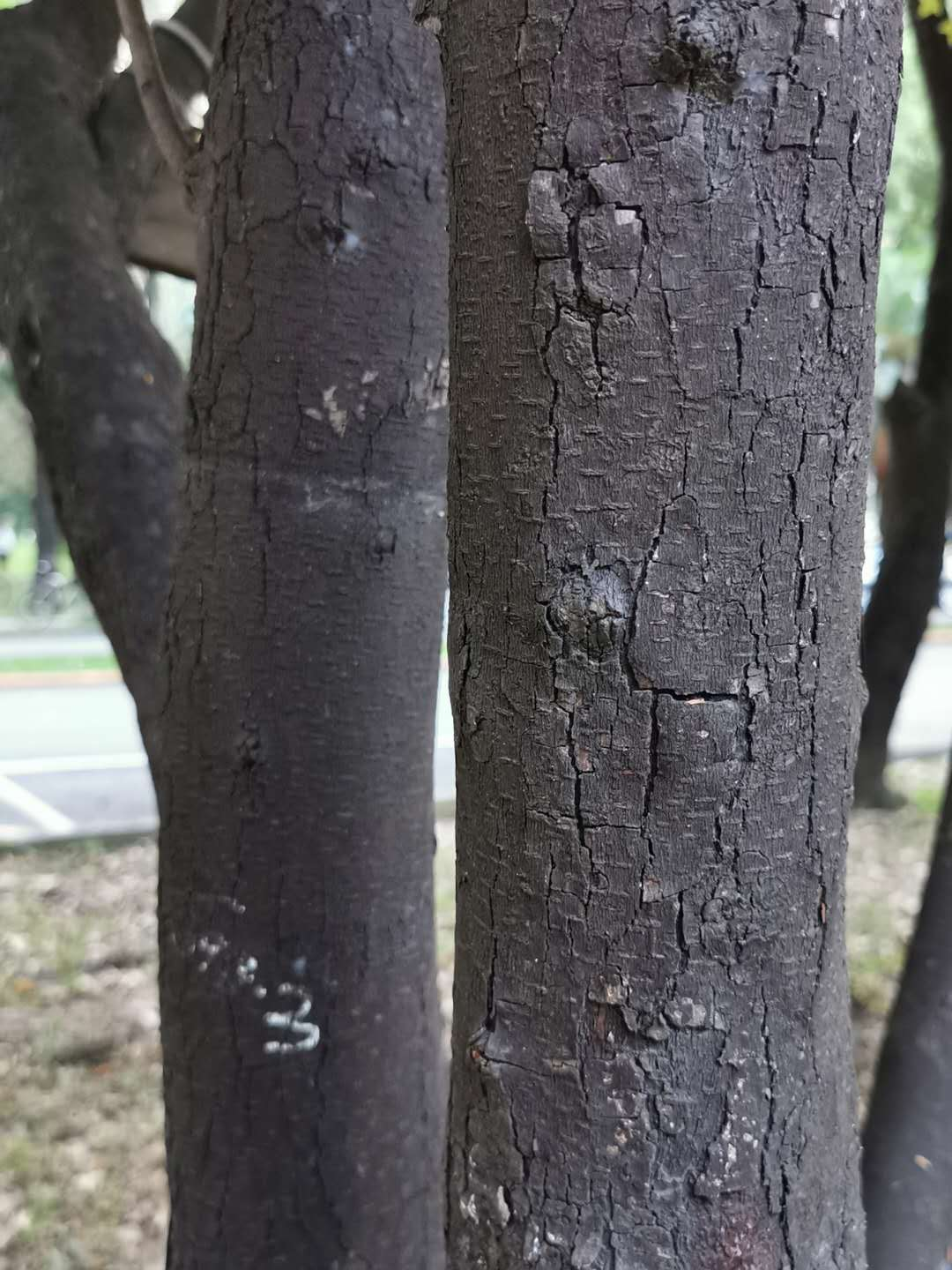

Conservation status
- Least Concern (IUCN 3.1)

Scientific classification
- Kingdom: Plantae
- Clade: Tracheophytes
- Clade: Angiosperms
- Clade: Eudicots
- Clade: Asterids
- Order: Ericales
- Family: Ebenaceae
- Genus: Diospyros
- Species: D. eriantha

Binomial name
- Diospyros eriantha Champ. ex Benth.

Synonyms
- Diospyros eriantha var. velascoi (Merr.) Bakh.; Diospyros teysmannii Miq.; Diospyros velascoi Merr.; Ebenus teysmannii (Miq.) Kuntze

= Diospyros eriantha =

Species of flowering plant

Diospyros eriantha, the woolly-flowered persimmon, is a tree in the family Ebenaceae. It is native to China and Southeast Asia.

== Description ==
Diospyros eriantha grows up to 7 m (20 ft) tall. The papery leaves measure up to 9.5 cm (3.7 in) long and 4 cm (1.6 in) wide. The fruits are ellipsoid, black, up to 1 cm (0.4 in) long.

== Taxonomy ==
Diospyros eriantha was validly described by English botanist George Bentham, based on the earlier description in Hooker's Journal of Botany and Kew Garden Miscellany by John George Champion in 1852. The type specimen was collected in Hong Kong. The specific epithet eriantha means 'woolly flowers'.

== Distribution and habitat ==
Diospyros eriantha is found in and around southern China, Indochina, Sumatra, Java, Borneo, Taiwan and the Philippines.

== Conservation ==
Diospyros eriantha has been assessed as least concern on the IUCN Red List. Its population is stable, with no significant threats identified. The species is present in some protected areas.

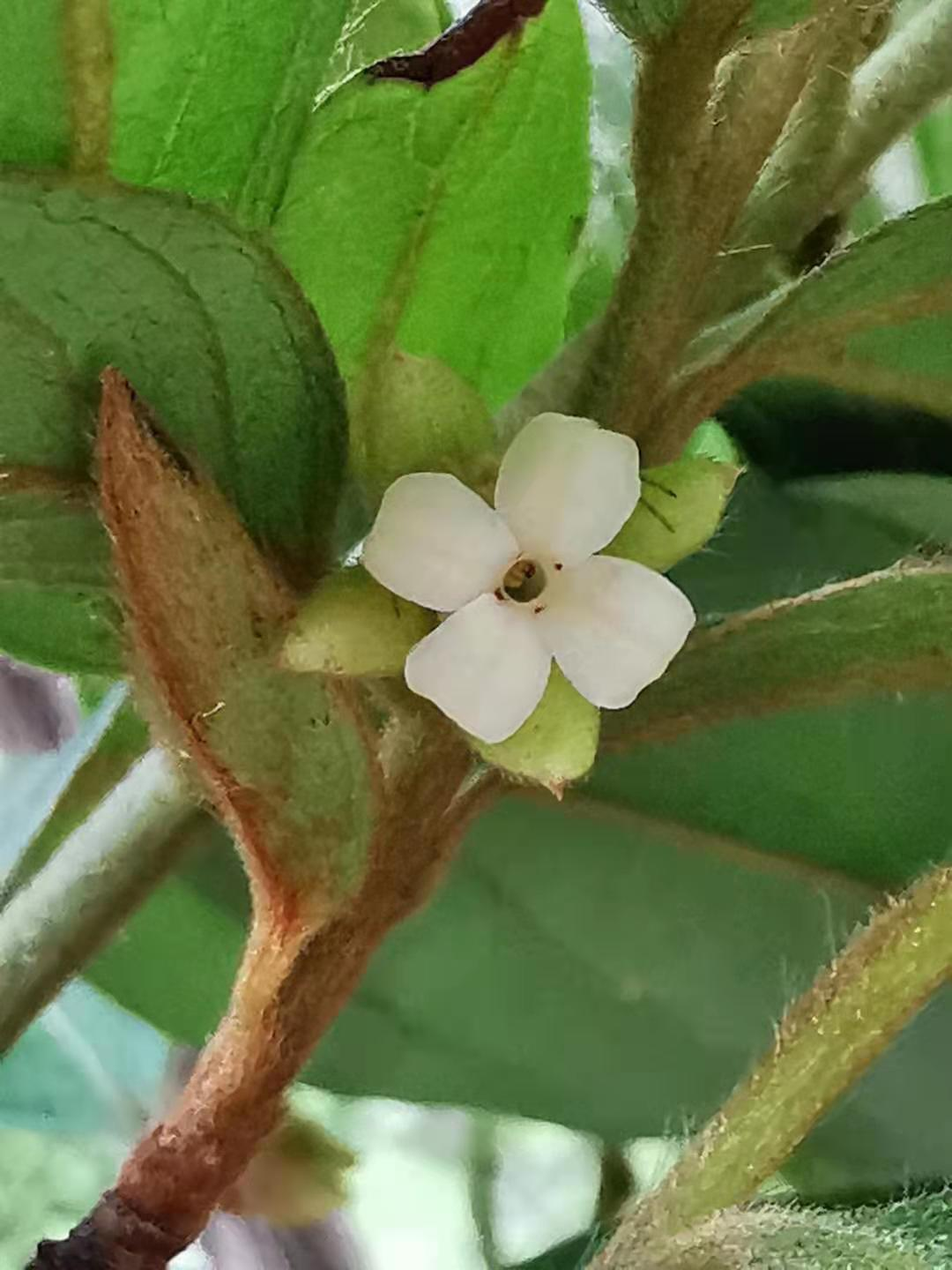
Stamens and pistils are short.

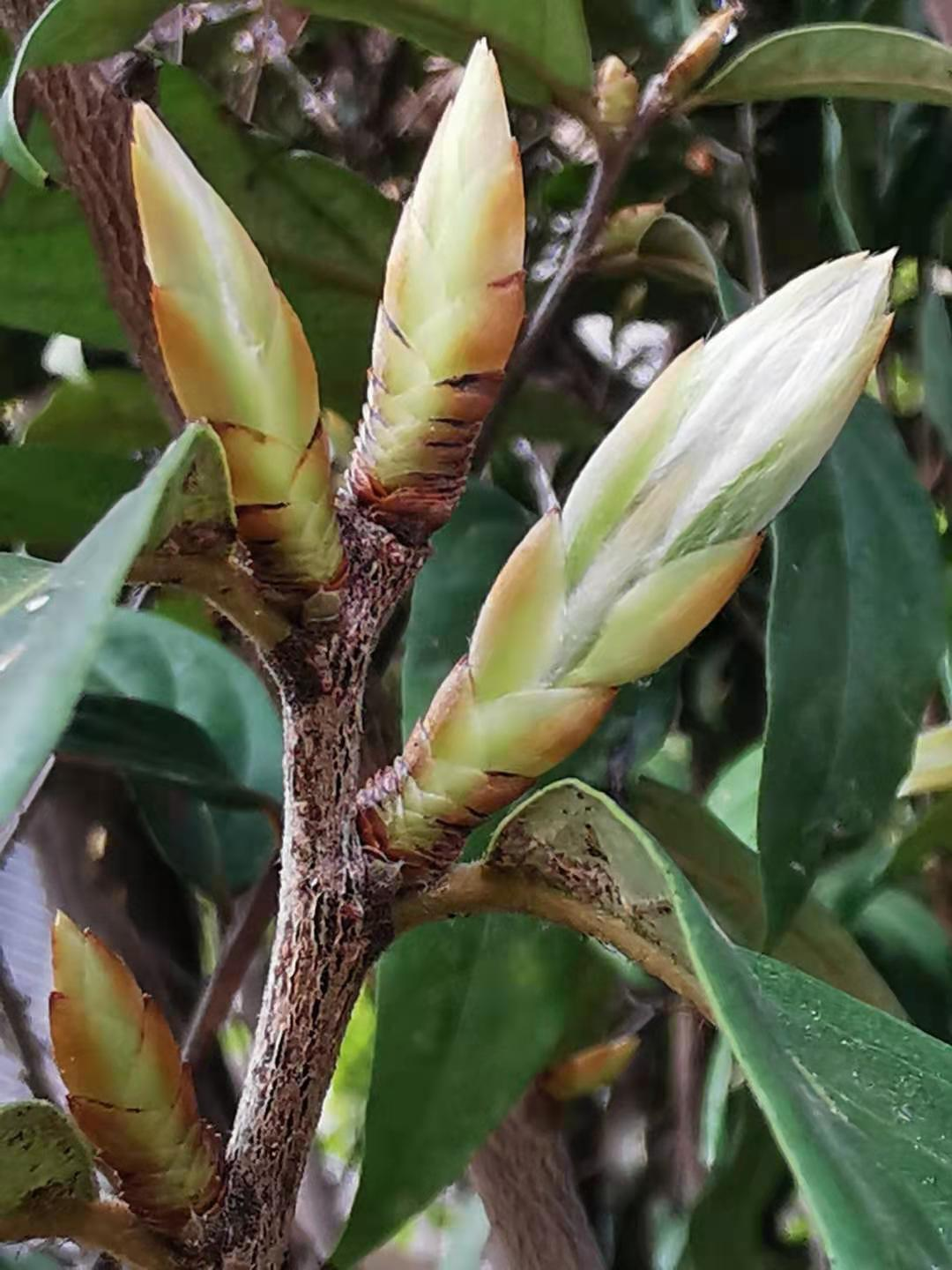
New buds

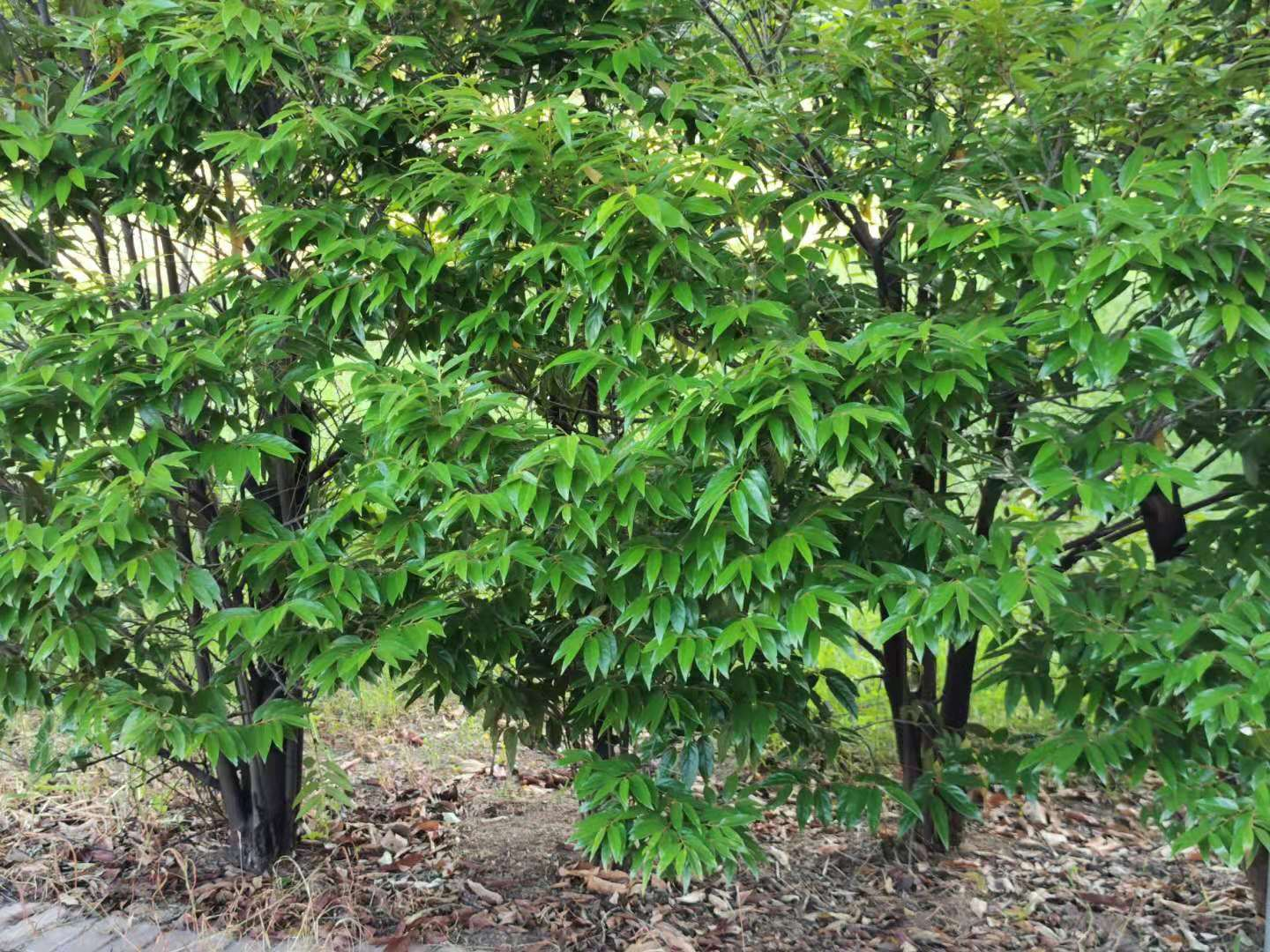
Stem branches early.
