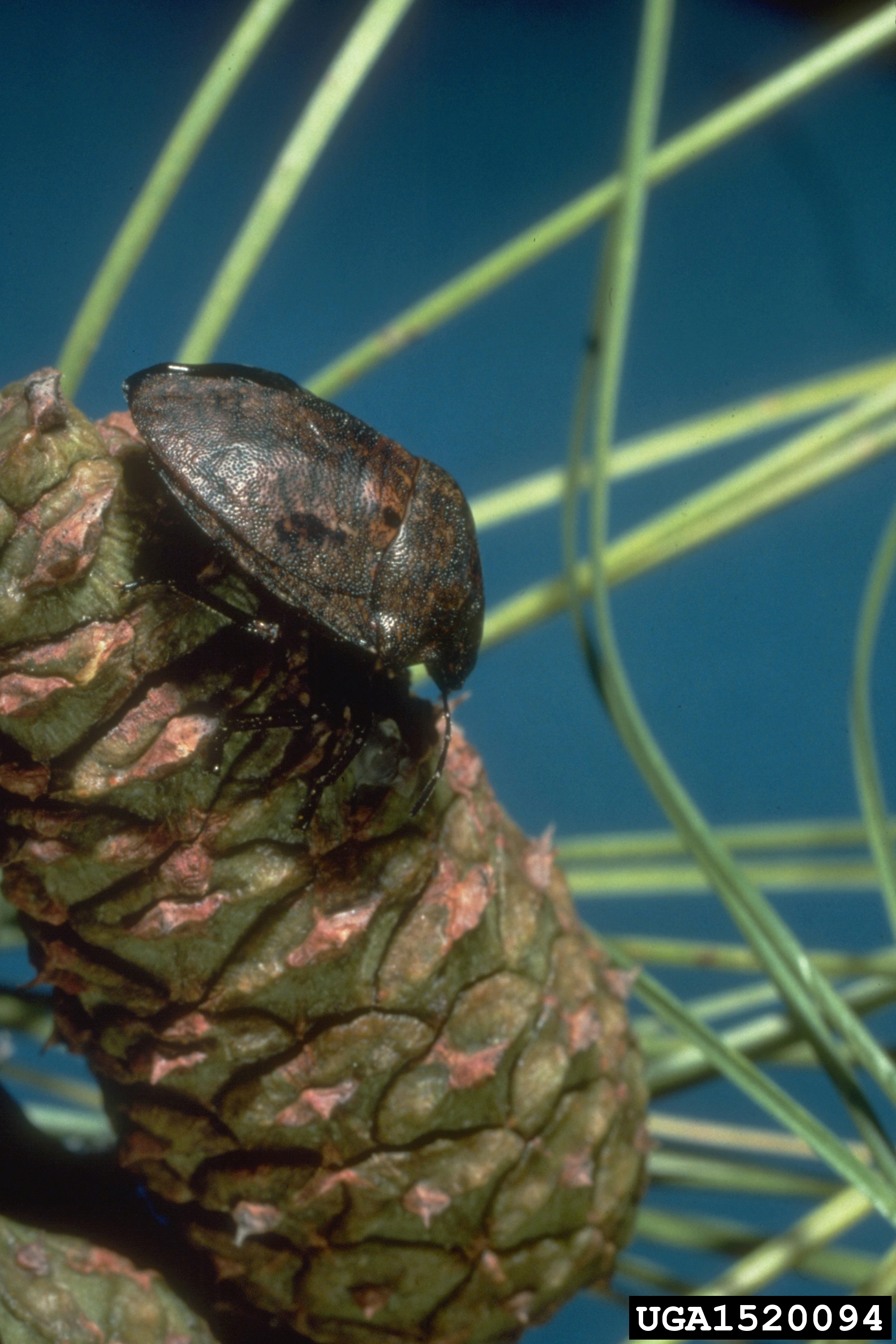
- Tetyra bipunctata

Scientific classification
- Domain: Eukaryota
- Kingdom: Animalia
- Phylum: Arthropoda
- Class: Insecta
- Order: Hemiptera
- Suborder: Heteroptera
- Family: Scutelleridae
- Subfamily: Pachycorinae
- Genus: Tetyra; Fabricius, 1803

= Tetyra =

Genus of true bugs

Tetyra is a genus of shield-backed bugs in the family Scutelleridae. There are about seven described species in Tetyra.

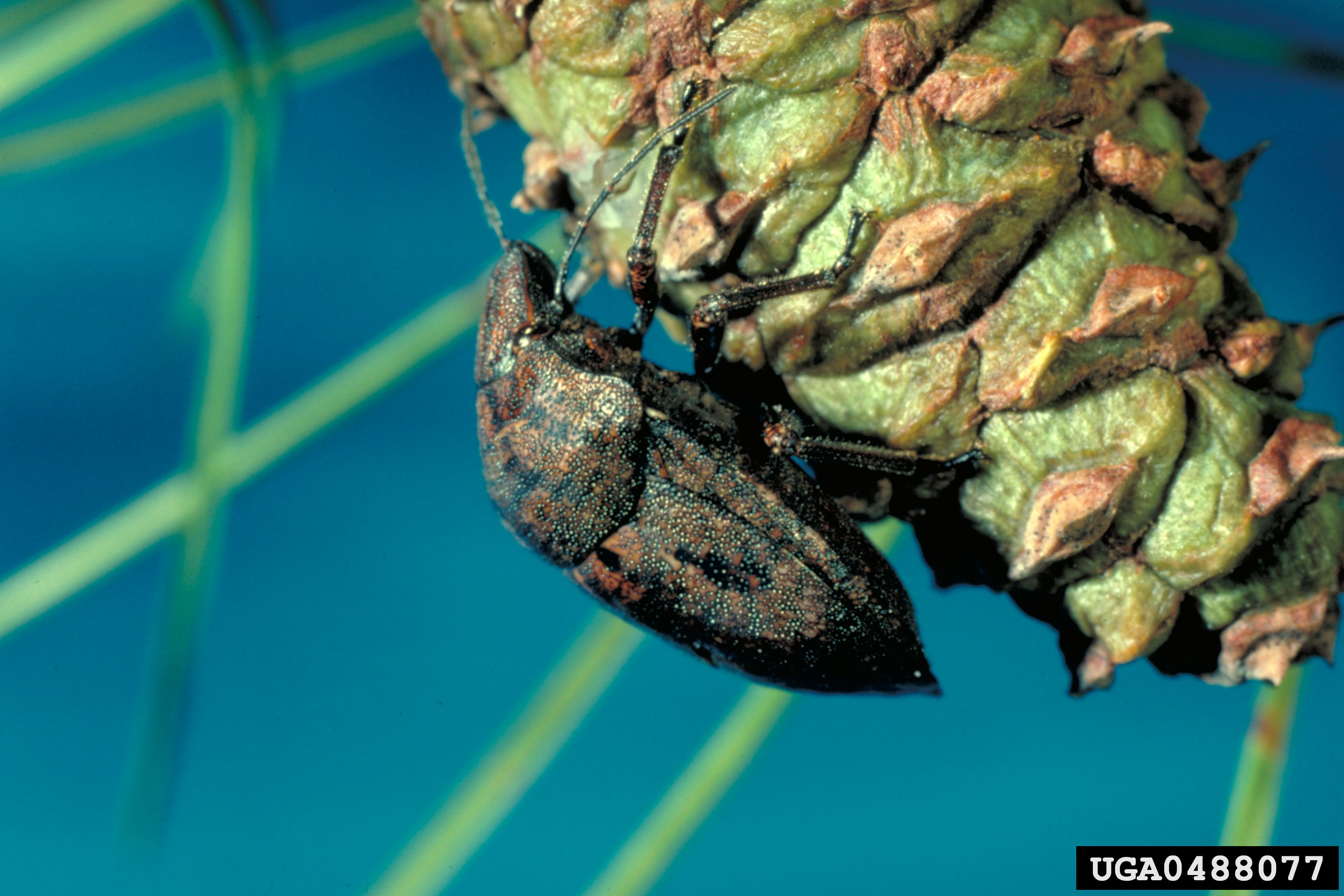
Tetyra bipunctata

== Species ==
These seven species belong to the genus Tetyra:

- Tetyra antillarum Kirkaldy, 1909
- Tetyra bipunctata (Herrich-schaeffer, 1839) (shieldbacked pine seed bug)
- Tetyra marginata
- Tetyra ocellata
- Tetyra pinguis Germar, 1839
- Tetyra robusta Uhler, 1897
- † Tetyra hassii Heer, 1853
