= Tetyra antillarum =

Scientific classification
- Domain: Eukaryota
- Kingdom: Animalia
- Phylum: Arthropoda
- Class: Insecta
- Order: Hemiptera
- Suborder: Heteroptera
- Family: Scutelleridae
- Genus: Tetyra
- Species: T. antillarum

Binomial name
- Tetyra antillarum Kirkaldy, 1909

Species of true bug

Tetyra antillarum is a species of shield-backed bug in the family Scutelleridae. It is found in the Caribbean Sea, Central America, and North America.
