= Tetyra robusta =

Scientific classification
- Domain: Eukaryota
- Kingdom: Animalia
- Phylum: Arthropoda
- Class: Insecta
- Order: Hemiptera
- Suborder: Heteroptera
- Family: Scutelleridae
- Genus: Tetyra
- Species: T. robusta

Binomial name
- Tetyra robusta Uhler, 1897

Species of true bug

Tetyra robusta is a species of shield-backed bug in the family Scutelleridae. It is found in Central America and North America.
