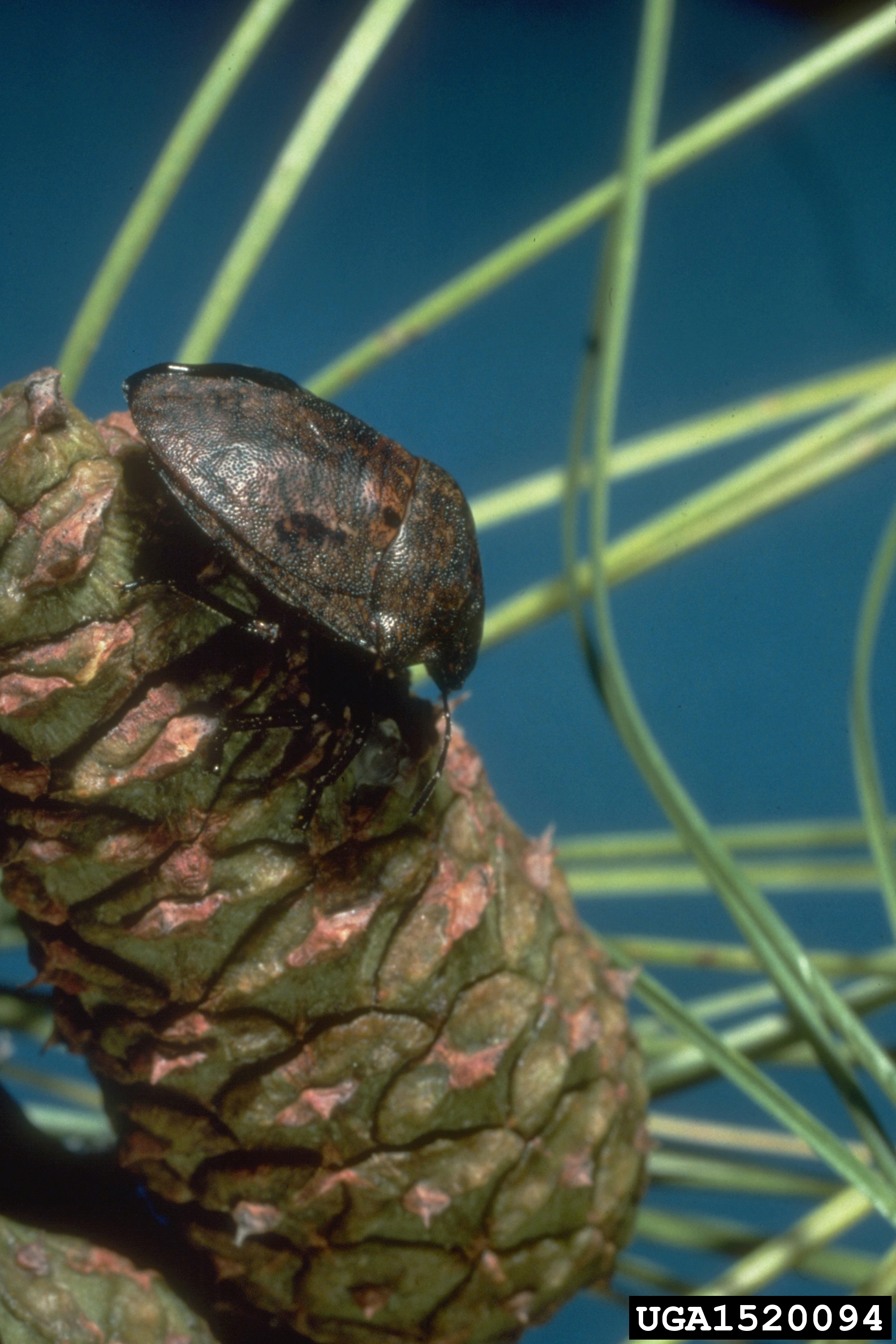

Scientific classification
- Domain: Eukaryota
- Kingdom: Animalia
- Phylum: Arthropoda
- Class: Insecta
- Order: Hemiptera
- Suborder: Heteroptera
- Family: Scutelleridae
- Genus: Tetyra
- Species: T. bipunctata

Binomial name
- Tetyra bipunctata (Herrich-Schaeffer, 1839)

= Tetyra bipunctata =

Species of true bug

Tetyra bipunctata, the shieldbacked pine seed bug, is a species of shield-backed bug in the family Scutelleridae. It is found in Central America and North America.

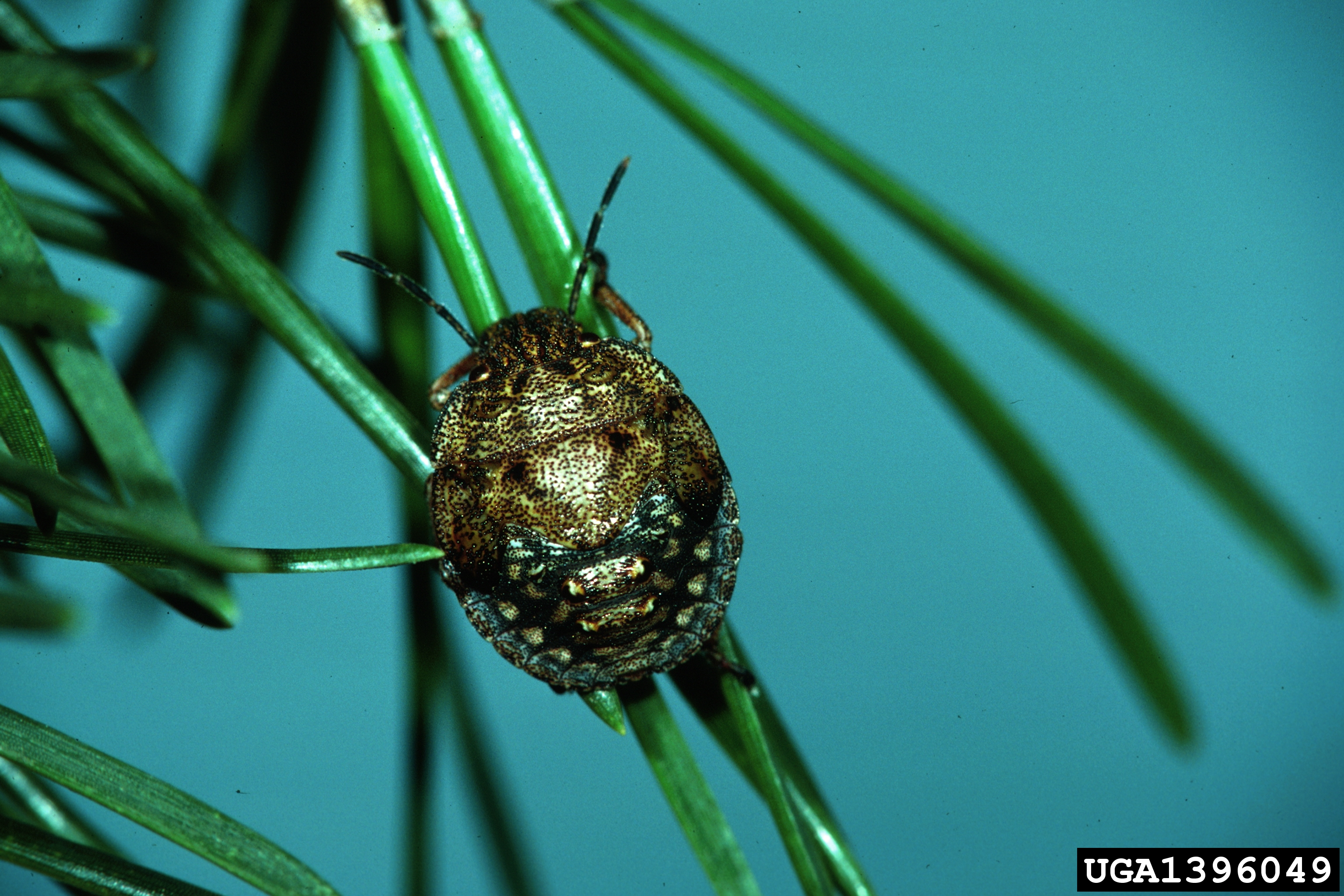
Shieldbacked pine seed bug, Tetyra bipunctata

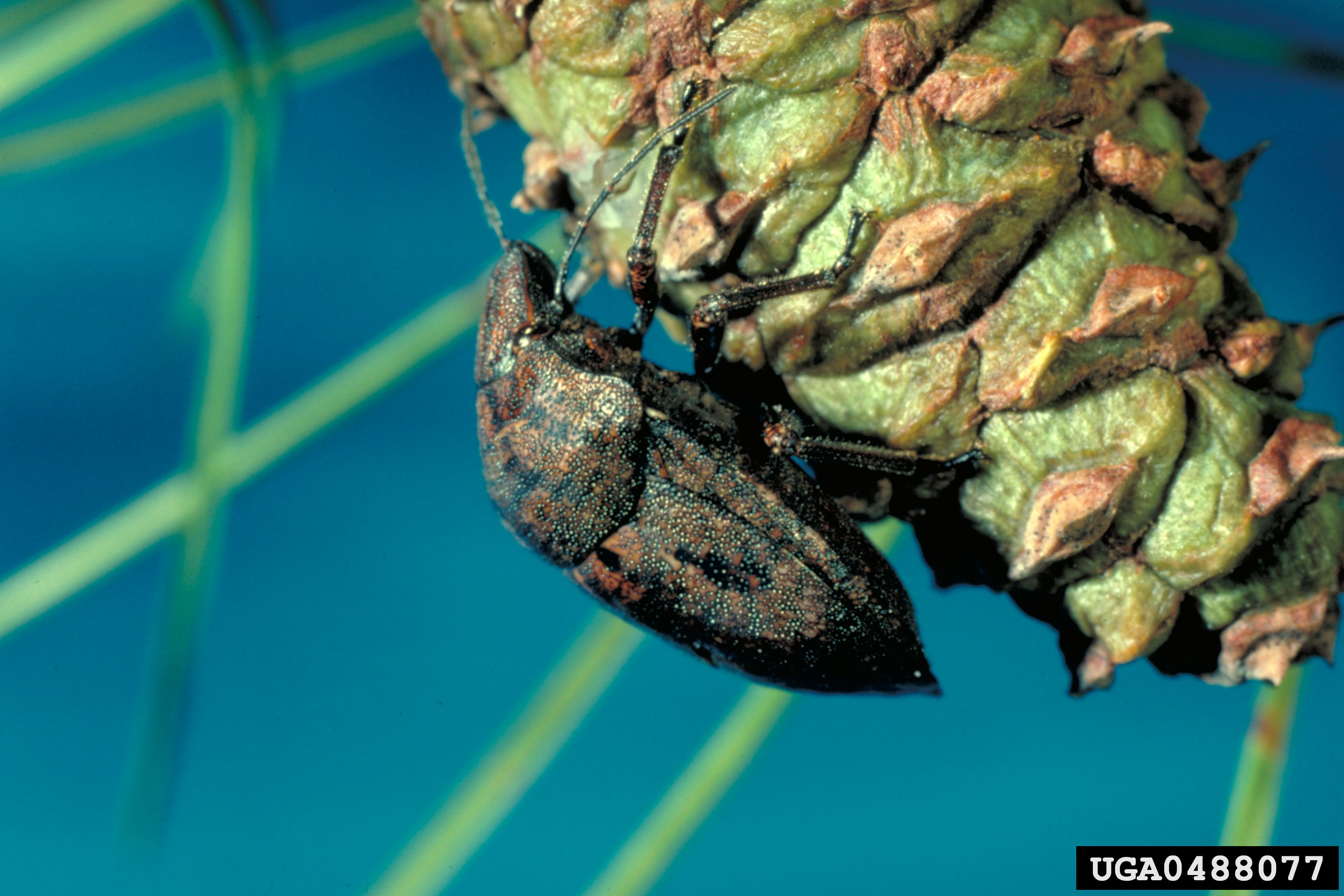
Shieldbacked pine seed bug, Tetyra bipunctata
