= Diolcus chrysorrhoeus =

Scientific classification
- Kingdom: Animalia
- Phylum: Arthropoda
- Class: Insecta
- Order: Hemiptera
- Suborder: Heteroptera
- Family: Scutelleridae
- Genus: Diolcus
- Species: D. chrysorrhoeus

Binomial name
- Diolcus chrysorrhoeus (Fabricius, 1803)

Species of true bug

Diolcus chrysorrhoeus is a species of shield-backed bug in the family Scutelleridae. It is found in North America.
