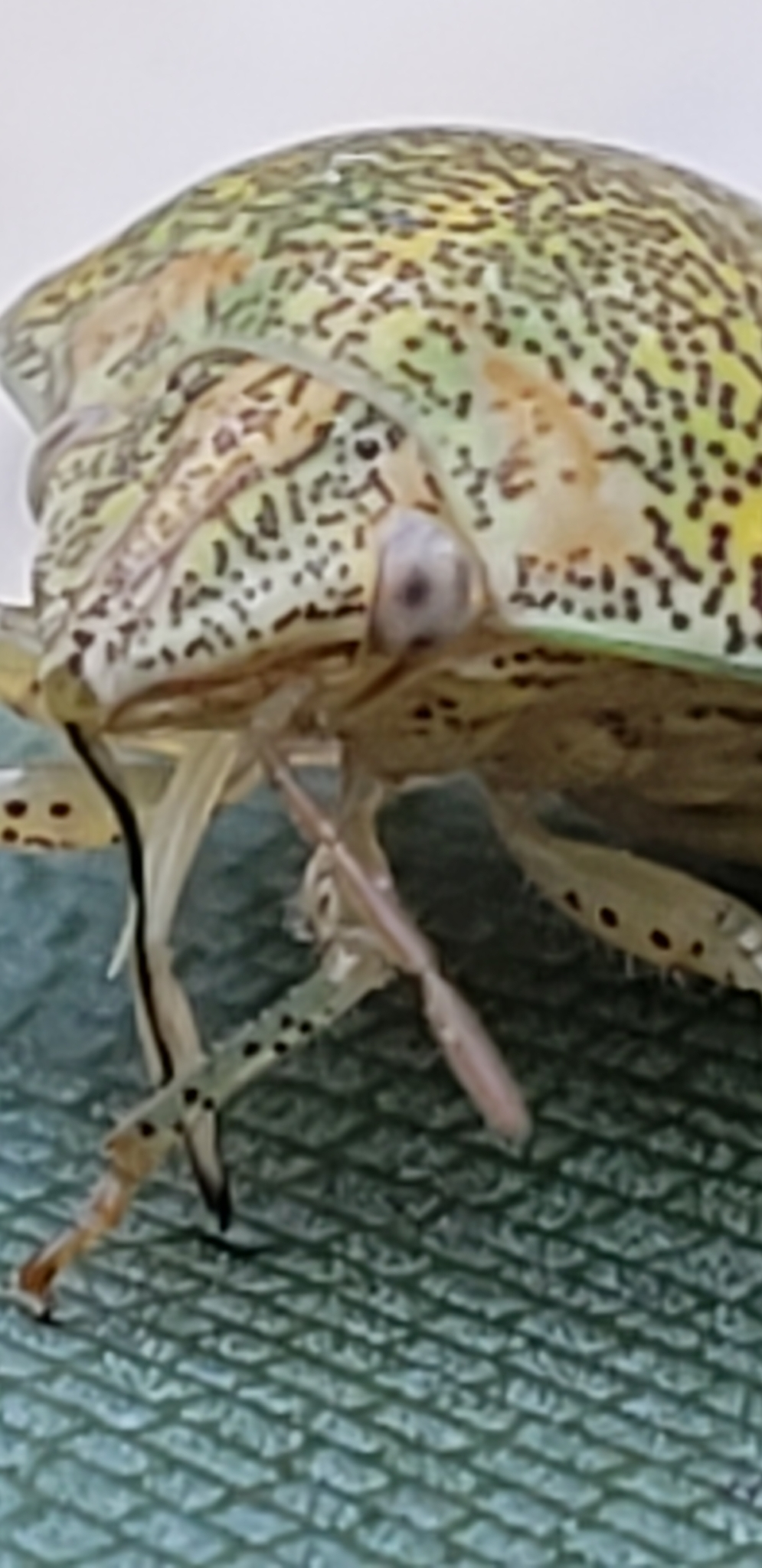

Scientific classification
- Domain: Eukaryota
- Kingdom: Animalia
- Phylum: Arthropoda
- Class: Insecta
- Order: Hemiptera
- Suborder: Heteroptera
- Family: Scutelleridae
- Genus: Diolcus
- Species: D. irroratus

Binomial name
- Diolcus irroratus (Fabricius, 1775)

Synonyms
- Cimex irroratus Fabricius, 1775

= Diolcus irroratus =

Species of true bug

Diolcus irroratus is a species of shield-backed bug in the family Scutelleridae. It is found in the Caribbean Sea and North America.
