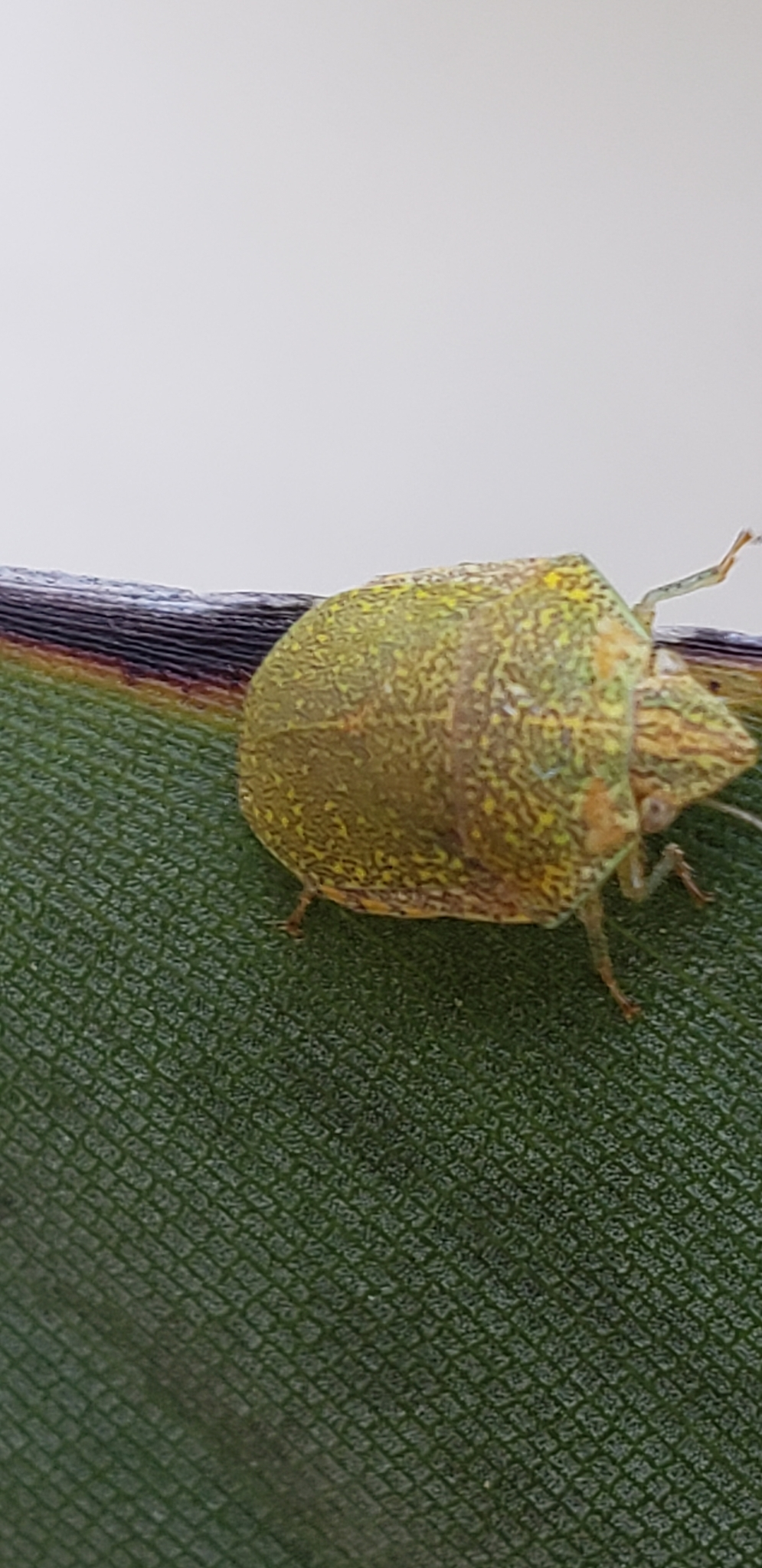
- Diolcus irroratus

Scientific classification
- Kingdom: Animalia
- Phylum: Arthropoda
- Class: Insecta
- Order: Hemiptera
- Suborder: Heteroptera
- Family: Scutelleridae
- Subfamily: Pachycorinae
- Genus: Diolcus; Mayr, 1864

= Diolcus =

Genus of true bugs

Diolcus is a genus of shield-backed bugs in the family Scutelleridae. There are at least three described species in Diolcus.

== Species ==
These three species belong to the genus Diolcus:

- Diolcus chrysorrhoeus (Fabricius, 1803)
- Diolcus irroratus (Fabricius, 1775)
- Diolcus variegatus (Herrich-Schaeffer, 1836)
