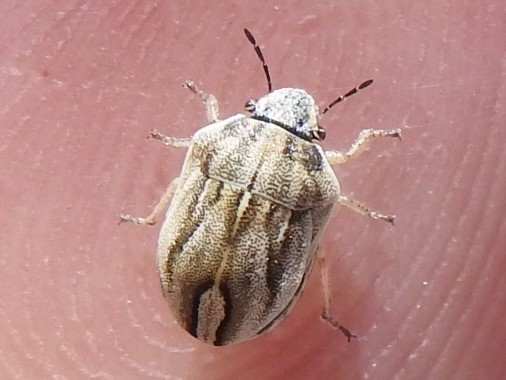

Scientific classification
- Domain: Eukaryota
- Kingdom: Animalia
- Phylum: Arthropoda
- Class: Insecta
- Order: Hemiptera
- Suborder: Heteroptera
- Family: Scutelleridae
- Genus: Homaemus
- Species: H. parvulus

Binomial name
- Homaemus parvulus (Germar, 1839)

= Homaemus parvulus =

Species of true bug

Homaemus parvulus is a species of shield-backed bug in the family Scutelleridae. It is found in Central America and North America.
