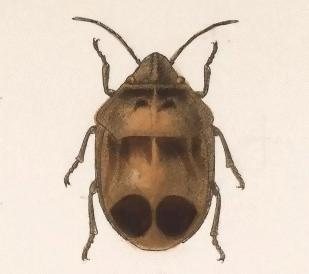
- Homaemus proteus

Scientific classification
- Domain: Eukaryota
- Kingdom: Animalia
- Phylum: Arthropoda
- Class: Insecta
- Order: Hemiptera
- Suborder: Heteroptera
- Family: Scutelleridae
- Subfamily: Pachycorinae
- Genus: Homaemus; Dallas, 1851

= Homaemus =

Genus of true bugs

Homaemus is a genus of North American shield-backed bugs in the family Scutelleridae. There are about 5 described species in Homaemus.

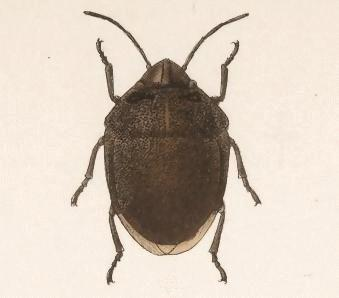
Homaemus proteus

== Species ==
- Homaemus aeneifrons (Say, 1824)
- Homaemus bijugis Uhler, 1872
- Homaemus parvulus (Germar, 1839)
- Homaemus proteus Stål, 1862
- Homaemus variegatus Van Duzee, 1914
