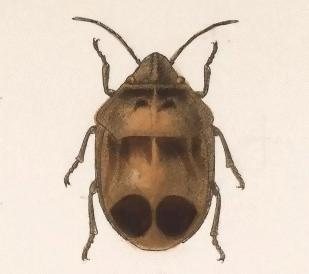

Scientific classification
- Kingdom: Animalia
- Phylum: Arthropoda
- Clade: Pancrustacea
- Class: Insecta
- Order: Hemiptera
- Suborder: Heteroptera
- Family: Scutelleridae
- Genus: Homaemus
- Species: H. proteus

Binomial name
- Homaemus proteus Stål, 1862

= Homaemus proteus =

Species of true bug

Homaemus proteus is a species of shield-backed bug in the family Scutelleridae. It is found in Central America, North America, and South America.

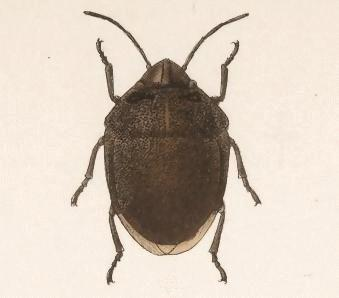
