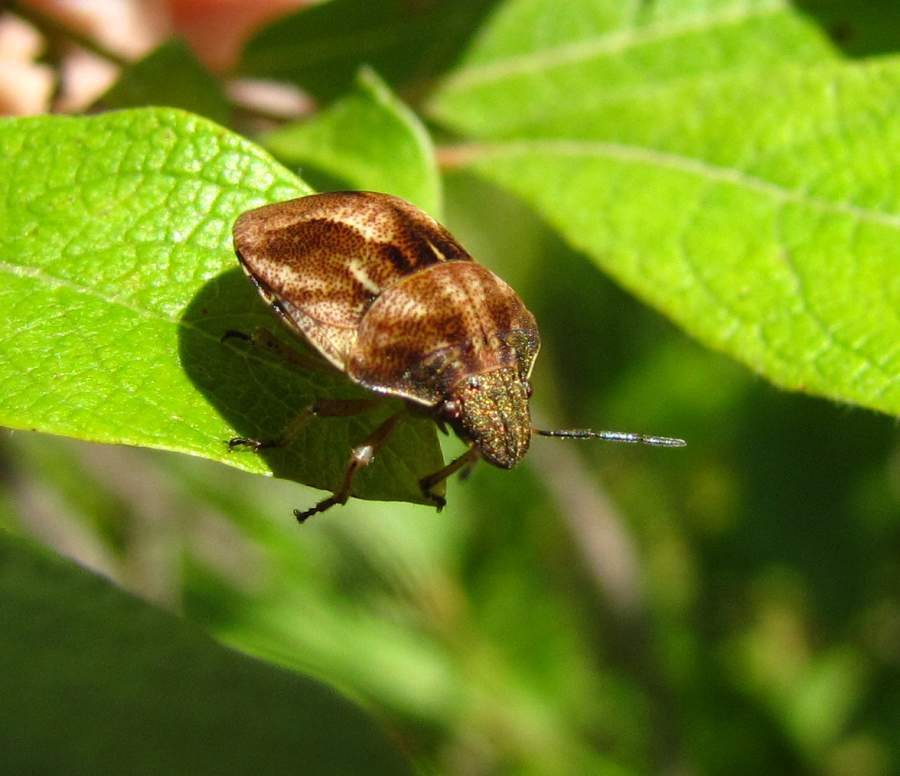

Scientific classification
- Domain: Eukaryota
- Kingdom: Animalia
- Phylum: Arthropoda
- Class: Insecta
- Order: Hemiptera
- Suborder: Heteroptera
- Family: Scutelleridae
- Genus: Homaemus
- Species: H. aeneifrons

Binomial name
- Homaemus aeneifrons (Say, 1824)

Synonyms
- Homaemus exilis (Herrich-Schaeffer, 1839); Pachycoris exilis Herrich-Schaeffer, 1839

= Homaemus aeneifrons =

Species of true bug

Homaemus aeneifrons is a species of shield-backed bug in the family Scutelleridae. It is found in Central America and North America.

== Subspecies ==
These two subspecies belong to the species Homaemus aeneifrons:

- Homaemus aeneifrons aeneifrons (Say, 1824)
- Homaemus aeneifrons extensus Walley, 1929
