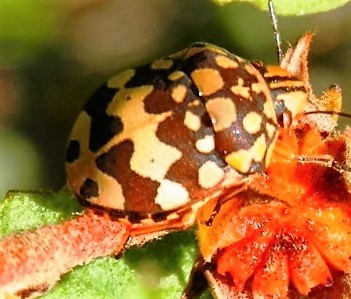
- Orsilochides scurrilis

Scientific classification
- Domain: Eukaryota
- Kingdom: Animalia
- Phylum: Arthropoda
- Class: Insecta
- Order: Hemiptera
- Suborder: Heteroptera
- Family: Scutelleridae
- Subfamily: Pachycorinae
- Genus: Orsilochides; Kirkaldy, 1909

= Orsilochides =

Genus of true bugs

Orsilochides is a genus of shield-backed bugs in the family Scutelleridae. There are at least three described species in Orsilochides.

== Species ==
An incomplete list of species belonging to the genus Orsilochides is as follows:

- Orsilochides guttata (Herrich-Schaeffer, 1839)
- Orsilochides leucoptera
- Orsilochides scurrilis
- Orsilochides stictica
- Orsilochides variabilis (Herrich-Schaeffer, 1837)
