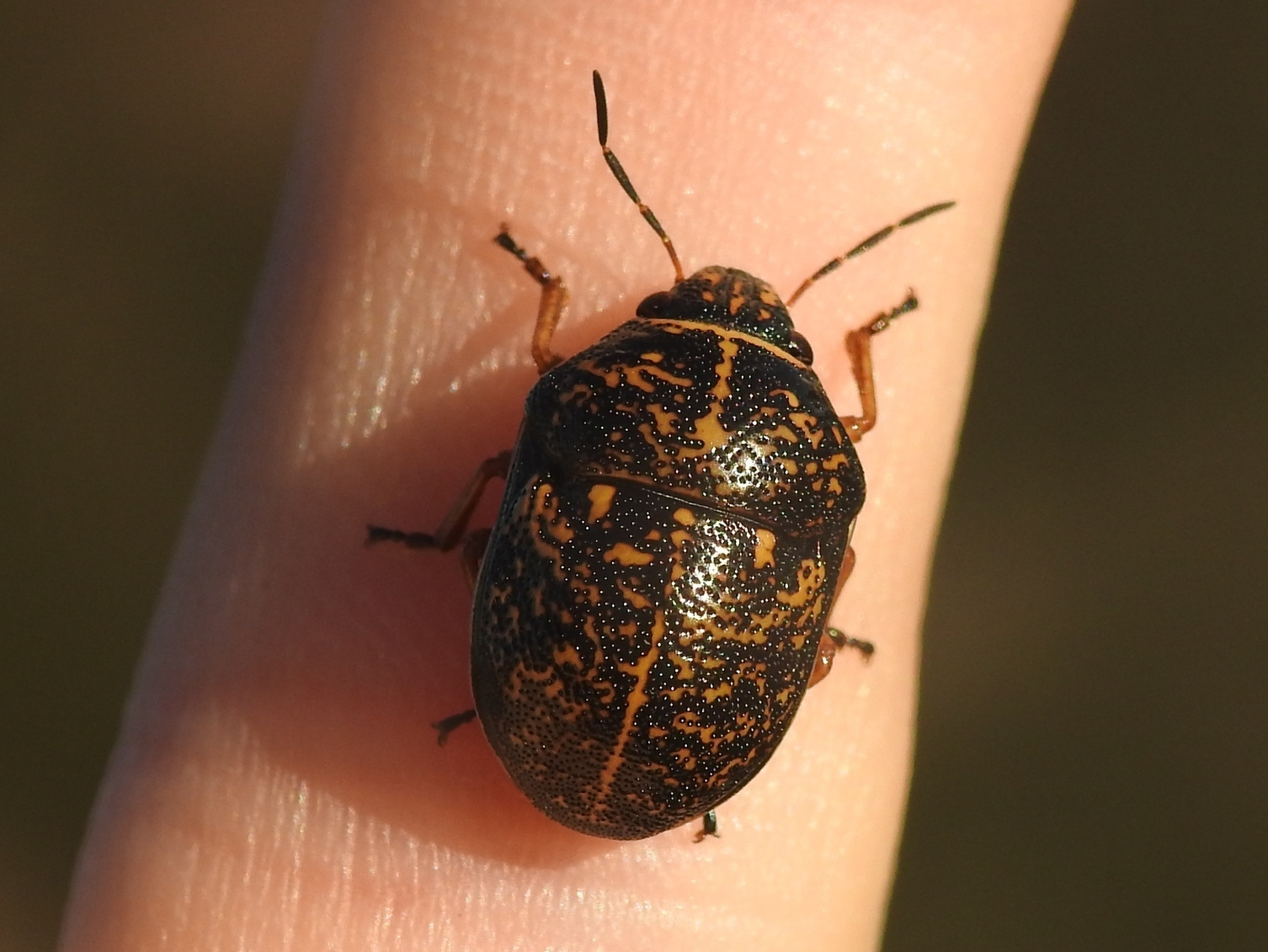

Scientific classification
- Domain: Eukaryota
- Kingdom: Animalia
- Phylum: Arthropoda
- Class: Insecta
- Order: Hemiptera
- Suborder: Heteroptera
- Family: Scutelleridae
- Genus: Orsilochides
- Species: O. guttata

Binomial name
- Orsilochides guttata (Herrich-Schaeffer, 1839)

Synonyms
- Pachycoris guttatus Herrich-Schaeffer, 1839

= Orsilochides guttata =

Species of true bug

Orsilochides guttata is a species of shield-backed bug in the family Scutelleridae. It is found in North America.
