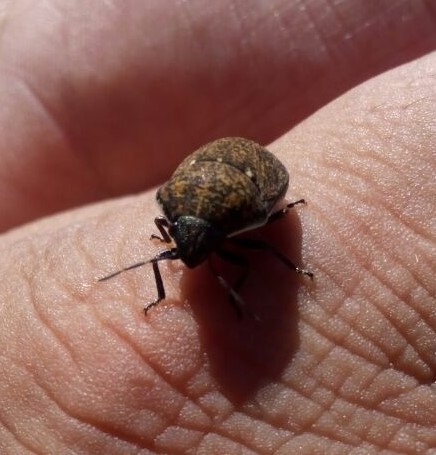

Scientific classification
- Domain: Eukaryota
- Kingdom: Animalia
- Phylum: Arthropoda
- Class: Insecta
- Order: Hemiptera
- Suborder: Heteroptera
- Family: Scutelleridae
- Genus: Orsilochides
- Species: O. variabilis

Binomial name
- Orsilochides variabilis (Herrich-Schaeffer, 1837)

Synonyms
- Pachycoris variabilis Herrich-Schaeffer, 1837

= Orsilochides variabilis =

Species of true bug

Orsilochides variabilis is a species of shield-backed bug in the family Scutelleridae.
