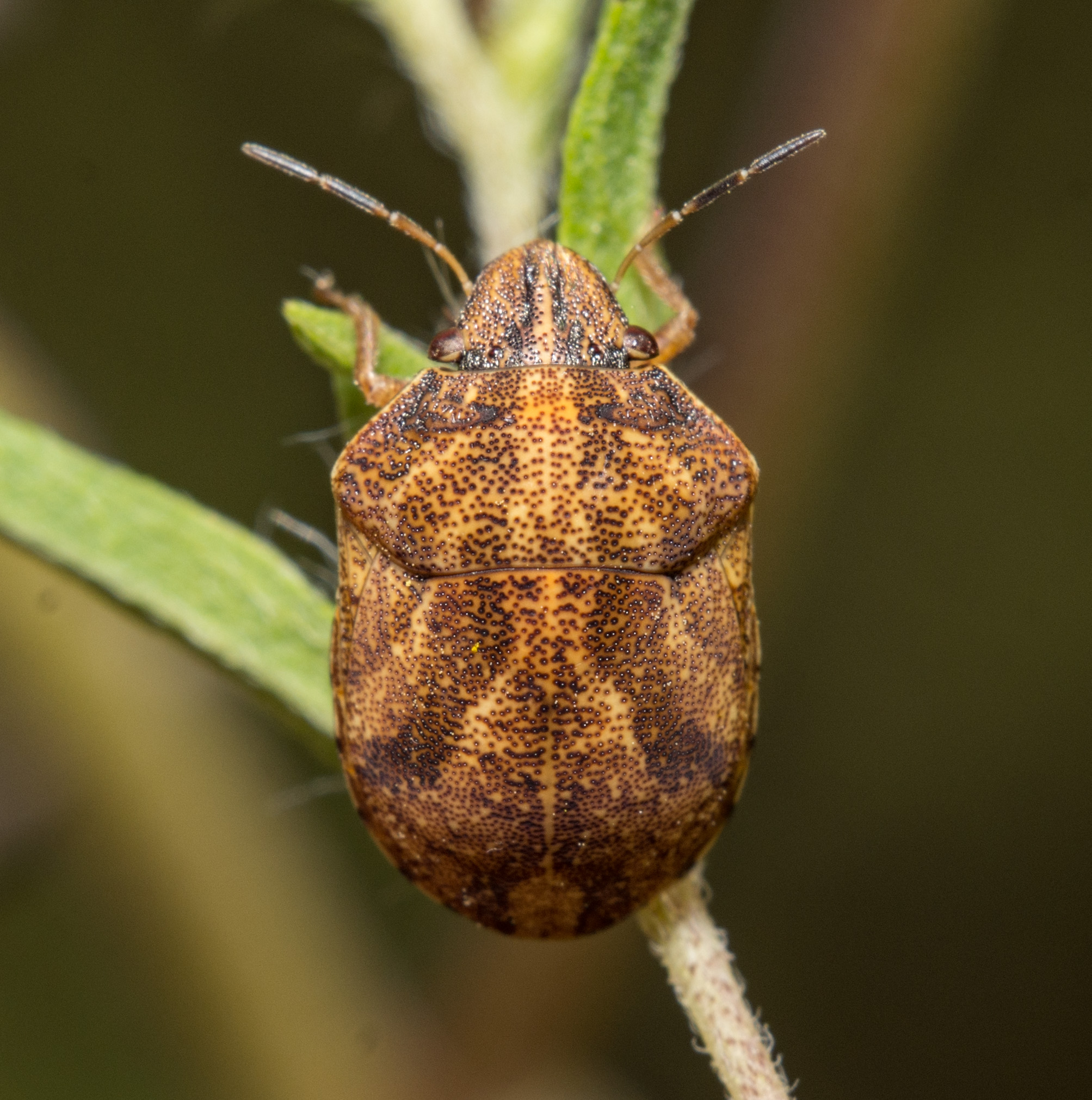
- Sphyrocoris obliquus

Scientific classification
- Domain: Eukaryota
- Kingdom: Animalia
- Phylum: Arthropoda
- Class: Insecta
- Order: Hemiptera
- Suborder: Heteroptera
- Family: Scutelleridae
- Genus: Sphyrocoris
- Species: S. obliquus

Binomial name
- Sphyrocoris obliquus (Germar, 1839)

Synonyms
- Pachycoris obliquus Germar, 1839

= Sphyrocoris obliquus =

Species of true bug

Sphyrocoris obliquus is a species of shield-backed bug in the family Scutelleridae. It is found in the Caribbean Sea, Central America, North America, and South America.
