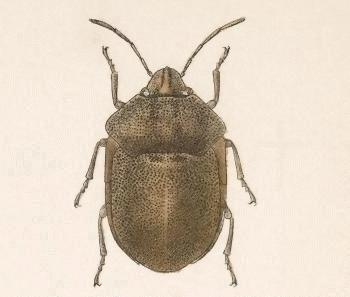
- Sphyrocoris punctellus

Scientific classification
- Domain: Eukaryota
- Kingdom: Animalia
- Phylum: Arthropoda
- Class: Insecta
- Order: Hemiptera
- Suborder: Heteroptera
- Family: Scutelleridae
- Subfamily: Pachycorinae
- Genus: Sphyrocoris; Mayr, 1864

= Sphyrocoris =

Genus of true bugs

Sphyrocoris is a genus of shield-backed bugs in the family Scutelleridae. There are at least two described species in Sphyrocoris.

== Species ==
These two species belong to the genus Sphyrocoris:

- Sphyrocoris obliquus (Germar, 1839)
- Sphyrocoris punctellus (Stål, 1862)
