= List of shield bug species of Great Britain =

This article contains a list of shield bug species of Great Britain.

Forty-six species have been recorded.

== Superfamily Pentatomoidea ==
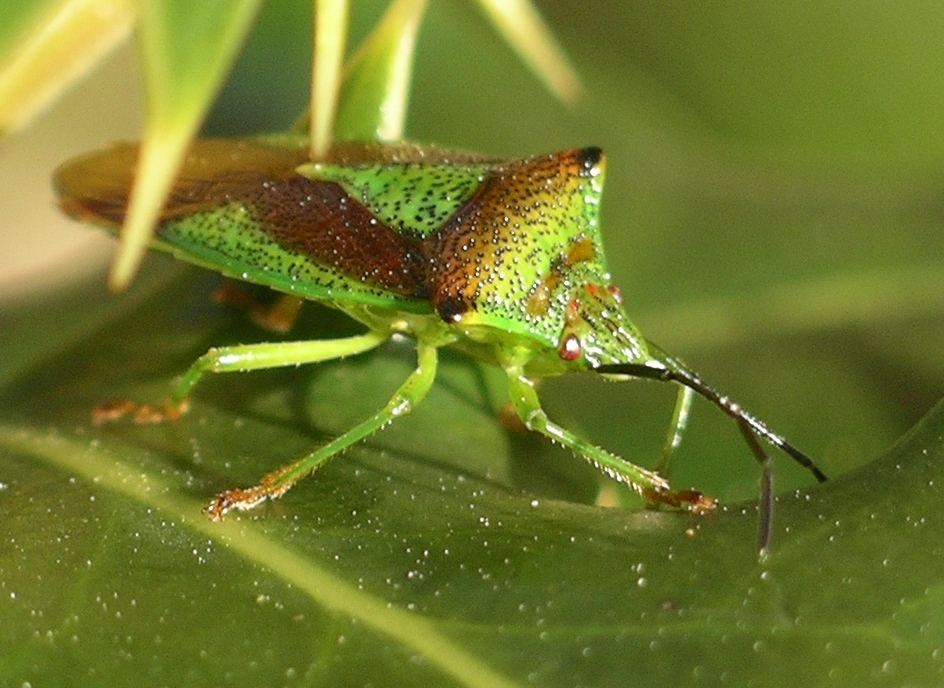
Acanthosoma haemorrhoidale

=== Family Acanthosomatidae – parent bugs ===
- Acanthosoma haemorrhoidale – hawthorn shield bug
- Cyphostethus tristriatus – juniper shield bug
- Elasmostethus interstinctus – birch shield bug
- Elasmucha grisea – parent bug
- Elasmucha ferrugata – stained shield bug

=== Family Scutelleridae – jewel bugs ===
- Eurygaster maura – scarce tortoise bug
- Eurygaster testudinaria – tortoise bug
- Eurygaster austriaca – graminate shield bug
- Odontoscelis fuliginosa – greater streaked shield bug
- Odontoscelis lineola – lesser streaked shield bug

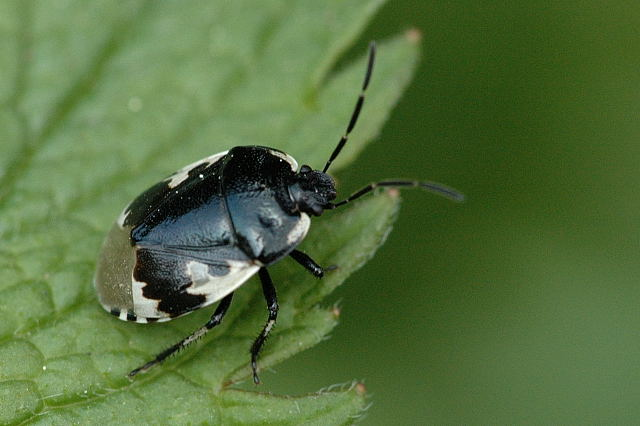
Tritomegas bicolor

=== Family Cydnidae – burrower bugs ===
- Legnotus limbosus – bordered shield bug
- Legnotus picipes – heath shield bug
- Canthophorus impressus – bastard toadflax bug
- Tritomegas bicolor (formerly Sehirus bicolor) – pied shield bug
- Tritomegas sexmaculatus – Rambur's pied shield bug
- Adomerus biguttatus – cow wheat shield bug
- Sehirus luctuosus – forget-me-not shield bug
- Geotomus punctulatus – Cornish shield bug
- Cydnus aterrimus – spurge shield bug

=== Family Thyreocoridae – ebony bugs ===
- Thyreocoris scarabaeoides – scarab shield bug

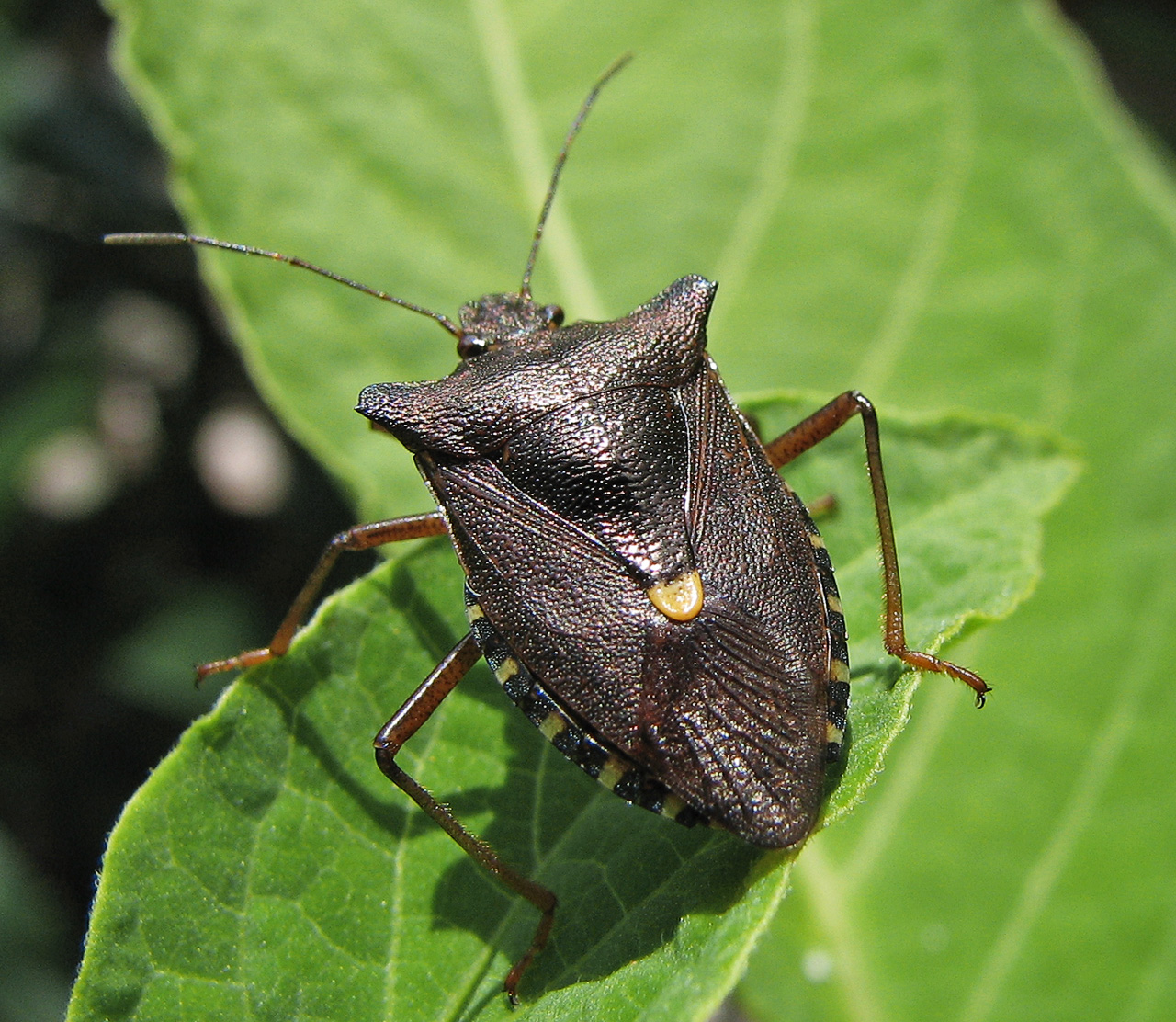
Pentatoma rufipes

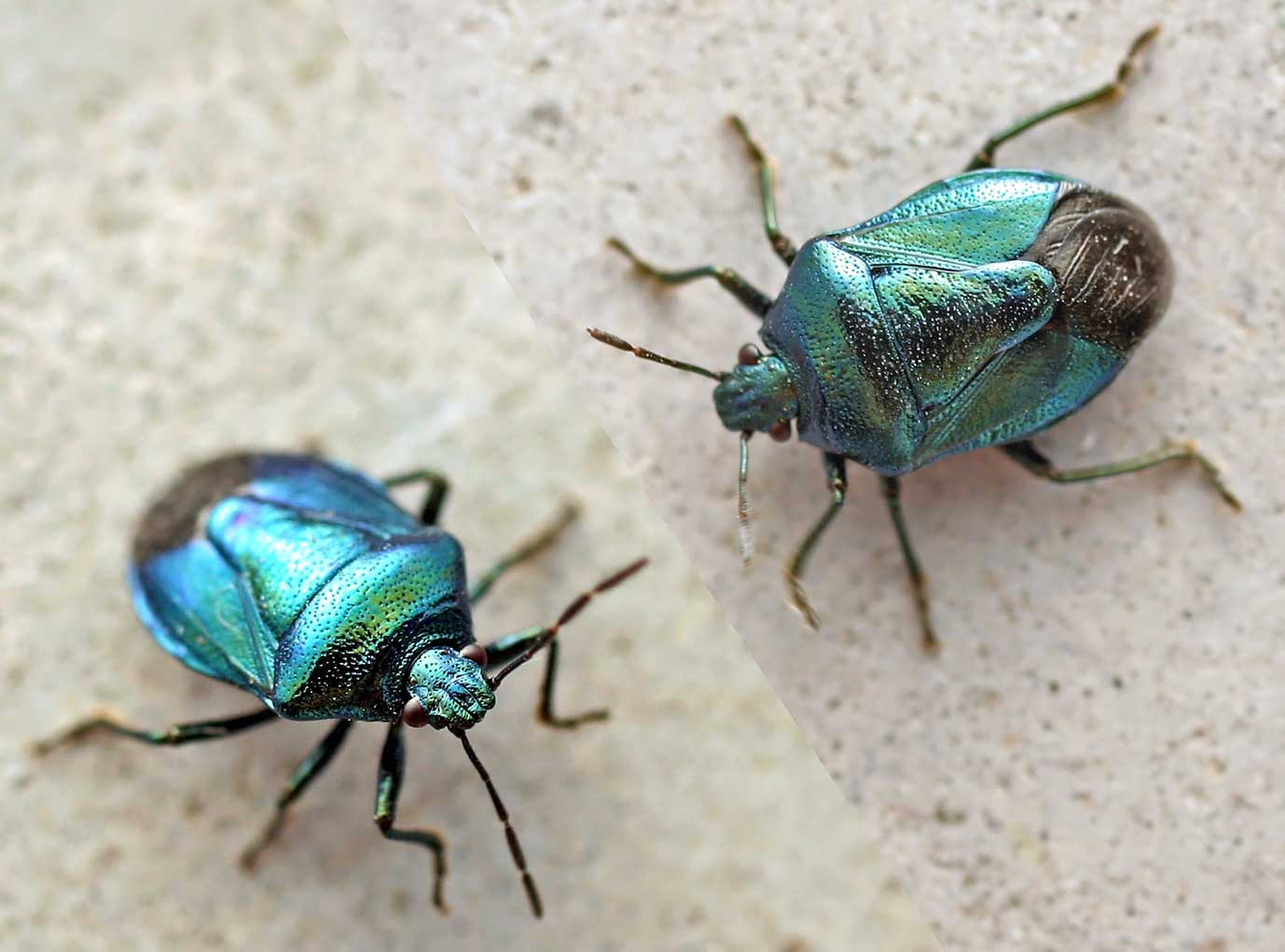
Zicrona caerulea

=== Family Pentatomidae – lesser shield bugs ===
- Graphosoma italicum – striped shield bug
- Podops inunctus – turtle shield bug
- Sciocoris cursitans – sandrunner
- Sciocoris sideritidis – ironwort shield bug
- Aelia acuminata – bishop's mitre
- Carpocoris purpureipennis – black-shouldered shield bug
- Dolycoris baccarum – sloe bug or hairy shield bug
- Eysarcoris aeneus – New Forest shield bug
- Eysarcoris venustissimus syn. Eysarcoris fabricii – woundwort shield bug
- Peribalus strictus syn. Holcostethus vernalis – vernal shield bug
- Neottiglossa pusilla – small grass shield bug
- Palomena prasina – green shield bug
- Pentatoma rufipes – forest bug
- Piezodorus lituratus – gorse shield bug
- Eurydema ornatum – red cabbage bug
- Eurydema oleracea – cabbage bug
- Eurydema dominulus – scarlet shieldbug
- Picromerus bidens – spiny shieldbug
- Rhacognathus punctatus – heather bug
- Troilus luridus – bronze shield bug
- Zicrona caerulea – blue shield bug
- Nezara viridula – southern green stink bug
- Dyroderes umbraculatus – white-shouldered shield bug
- Jalla dumosa – Jalla's shield bug
- Byrsinus flavicornis – burrower shield bug
- Chlorochroa juniperina (extinct)
