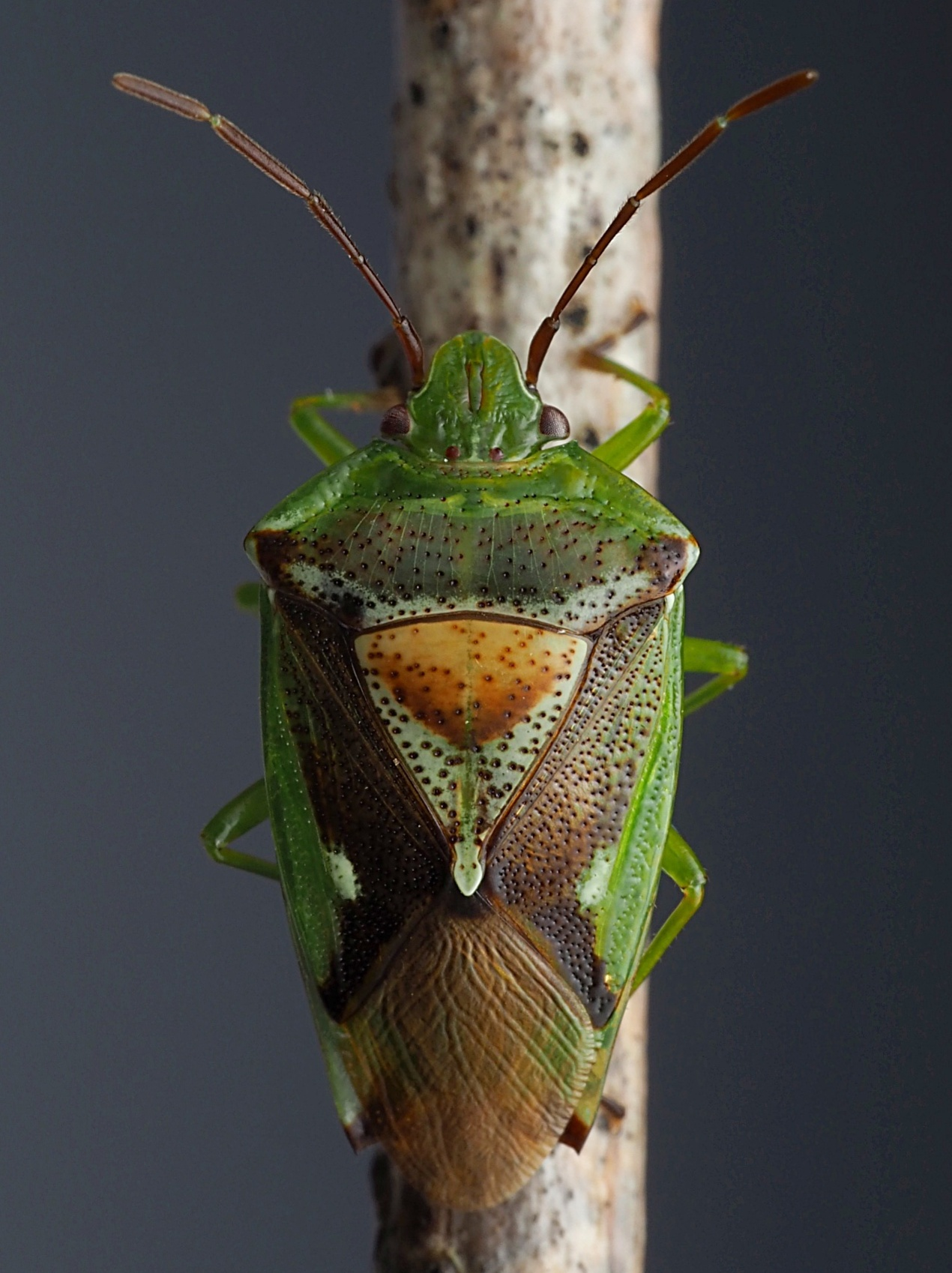
- Adult
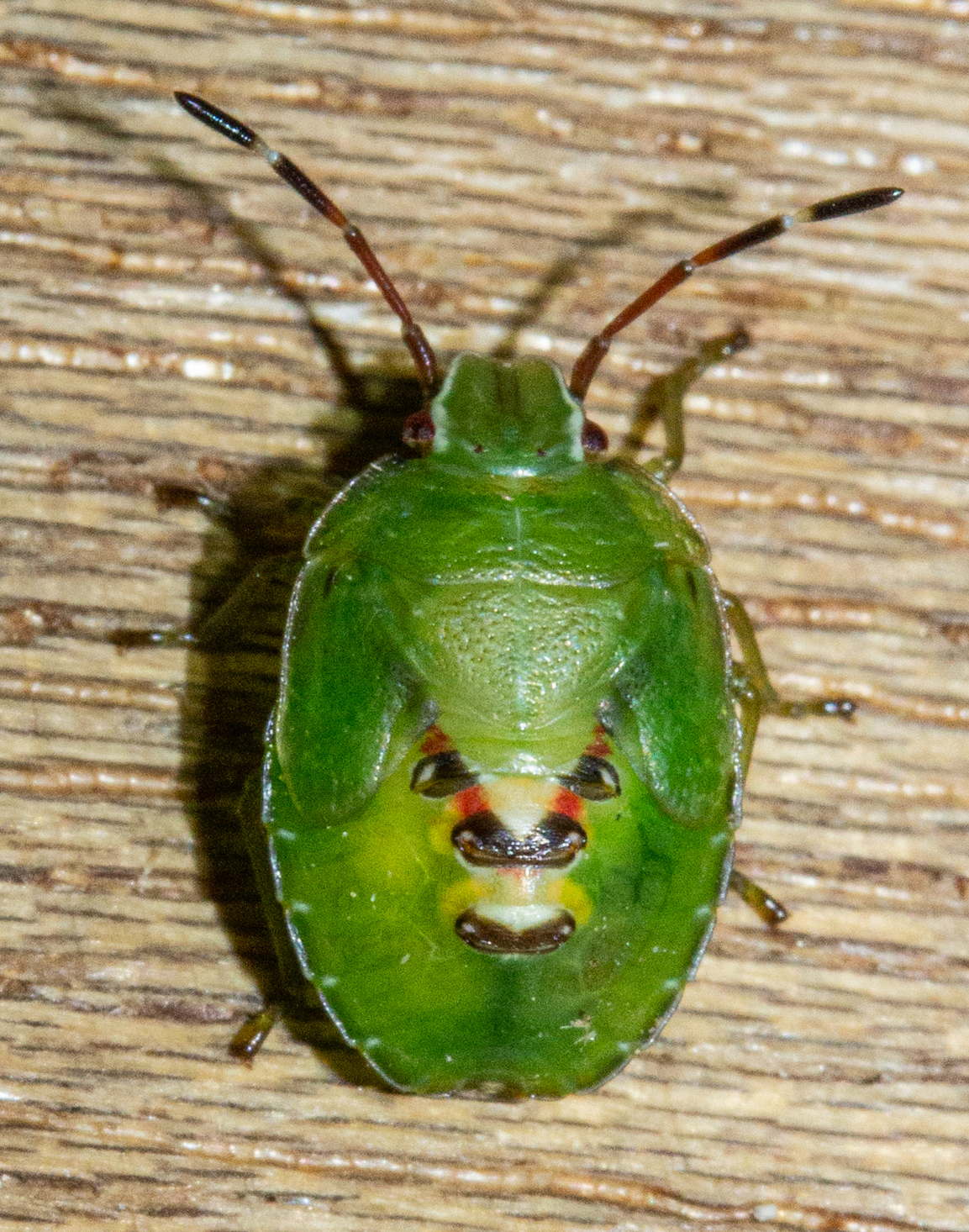
- Juvenile

Scientific classification
- Kingdom: Animalia
- Phylum: Arthropoda
- Class: Insecta
- Order: Hemiptera
- Suborder: Heteroptera
- Family: Acanthosomatidae
- Subfamily: Acanthosomatinae
- Genus: Oncacontias; Breddin, 1903
- Species: O. vittatus

Binomial name
- Oncacontias vittatus (Fabricius, 1781)

Synonyms
- List: Cimex vittatus Fabricius, 1781; Acanthosoma vittatum Dallas, 1851; Anubis vittatus White, 1878; Oncacontias brunneipennis Breddin, 1903

= Oncacontias =

Species of true bug

Oncacontias vittatus, also known as forest shield bug, is a species of shield bug only found in New Zealand. The adult is rather distinctive and conspicuous in colouration and is commonly encountered. It is herbivorous, with the adults being recorded feeding on Coriaria arborea and likely other plant species. However, the juveniles appear to have a more restricted diet, preferring to feed on grasses. O. vittatus was first described in taxonomic literature in 1781 by Danish zoologist Johan Christian Fabricius. It is widespread throughout New Zealand and is found in a wide range of habitats, but is commonly associated with forest. The adult is most common during spring months, but occurs year-round. Mating occurs in October and November, with the species apparently only producing one brood per year. The eggs of O. vittatus are known to be parasitised by Trissolcus maori, a species of parasitic wasp.

== Taxonomy ==
Oncacontias vittatus was first described in taxonomic literature in 1781 by Danish zoologist Johan Christian Fabricius as Cimex vittatus. In 1851, C. vittatus was moved to the Acanthosoma genus and was renamed as Acanthosoma vittatum. Later in 1878, A. vittatum was moved to the Anubis genus and was renamed as Anubis vittatus. In 1903, the genus Oncacontias was erected by German entomologist Gustav Breddin, who described the species as Oncacontias brunneipennis, and considered it to be closely related to, or a variety of, O. vittatus. Finally, in 1906, Anubis vittatus was moved into the Oncacontias genus and O. brunneipennis was recognized as a synonym of O. vittatus. The species was most recently revised in a 1995 study, which also provided an updated description for the species. O. vittatus is still the only species in the genus, making Oncacontias a monotypic genus. The lectotype, a specimen chosen to serve as the type specimen when the original describer did not provide one, is stored in the Natural History Museum of London. It is sometimes commonly referred to as the forest shield bug.

== Description ==
As adults, the male is 8.70–10.44 mm in length, whereas the female measures 10.33–11.74 mm. Their bodies base colour is yellowish to greenish. Throughout their length, the antennae are uniformly brown. The first section of the thorax, termed the pronotum, is creamy to yellowish along its margins. After this segment is the scutellum, a large triangular plate, which is brownish and transitions to creamy towards its rear. The legs are smooth and greenish. Covering the abdomen is the elytra, which is a hardened forewing. This is brownish with creamy markings on the margins and has a translucent membrane at its tip. The adults are fully winged and are able to fly when needed.

=== Juvenile ===
During its final stage before maturing, the juvenile is 7.14–7.44 mm in length. The head is coloured yellowish or greenish on the upper surface and yellowish or greenish on the lower surface. The antennae are yellowish to reddish-orange, with the third and fourth segments being pale at their bases. Like the head, the thorax is coloured yellowish to greenish. There are also shallow puncture marks scattered throughout the thorax, and the outer edges of the pronotum are brownish. The legs are yellowish to greenish, with their tips sometimes being darkened. The tergites (segments) of the abdomen are yellowish to greenish, with tergite three having two brownish plates, tergites four and five with brownish plates in the middle. Across these plates there is a red "v" marking.

=== Eggs ===
The egg is pale green in colour. It is somewhat spherical with rounded ends and are about 1.1 mm in length. It sticks to surfaces in clumps by some form of adhesive.

== Distribution and habitat ==
O. vittatus is only found in New Zealand, where it is widespread, being found on the North Island, South Island and Stewart Island. It can be found from lowland to alpine altitudes. Although it is usually regarded as a native forest dweller, it can also be found in a variety of habitat types, such as exotic forest, tussock, swamps, subalpine scrub and riverbanks. It has been commonly found on plant species such as tree ferns, tree tutu (Coriaria arborea) and southern beech (Nothofagus), but has also been recorded from numerous other species. It has been collected in leaf litter, moss, under logs and at the base of plants. Often, it is encountered basking in the sun in human-modified habitat on walls and fences.

== Life history ==
The species undergoes five instars, or phases between moults, before becoming sexually mature. The adult occurs throughout the year, but is most common in October and November (spring months), being somewhat abundant until February (late summer). During the winter months, the adult becomes inactive. Mating is known to occur from late October to early November, with the female laying eggs shortly afterwards. Copulation can last for several hours at a time and can occur numerous times over several days. The species is reportedly univoltine, meaning it produces only one brood per year. In one study, the eggs took roughly a month and a half to hatch. After doing so, they remained grouped near their egg shells. The first and second instar took 4 and 24 days, respectively, but the study was unable to rear it to later stages.

=== Diet ===
Like most shield bugs, O. vittatus is a herbivore that feeds on the sap of plants. The host plants are known to include tree tutu (Coriaria arborea) and, potentially, tree fuchsia (Fuchsia excorticata), māhoe (Melicytus ramiflorus), southern beech (Nothofagus) and daisy-bush (Olearia). As juveniles they have a more restricted diet, being generally found on grasses, typically being associated with plants such as Chionochloa conspicua and also tree fuchsia (Fuchsia excorticata).

== Predators and parasites ==
The species is reported to be unpalatable to spiders, with individuals being found in webs but not eaten. The eggs are known to be parasitised by Trissolcus maori, a species of Scelionidae wasp. The wasps are parasitoids that lay their eggs inside the eggs of O. vittatus, with the wasp eggs maturing into adults and killing the hosts.
