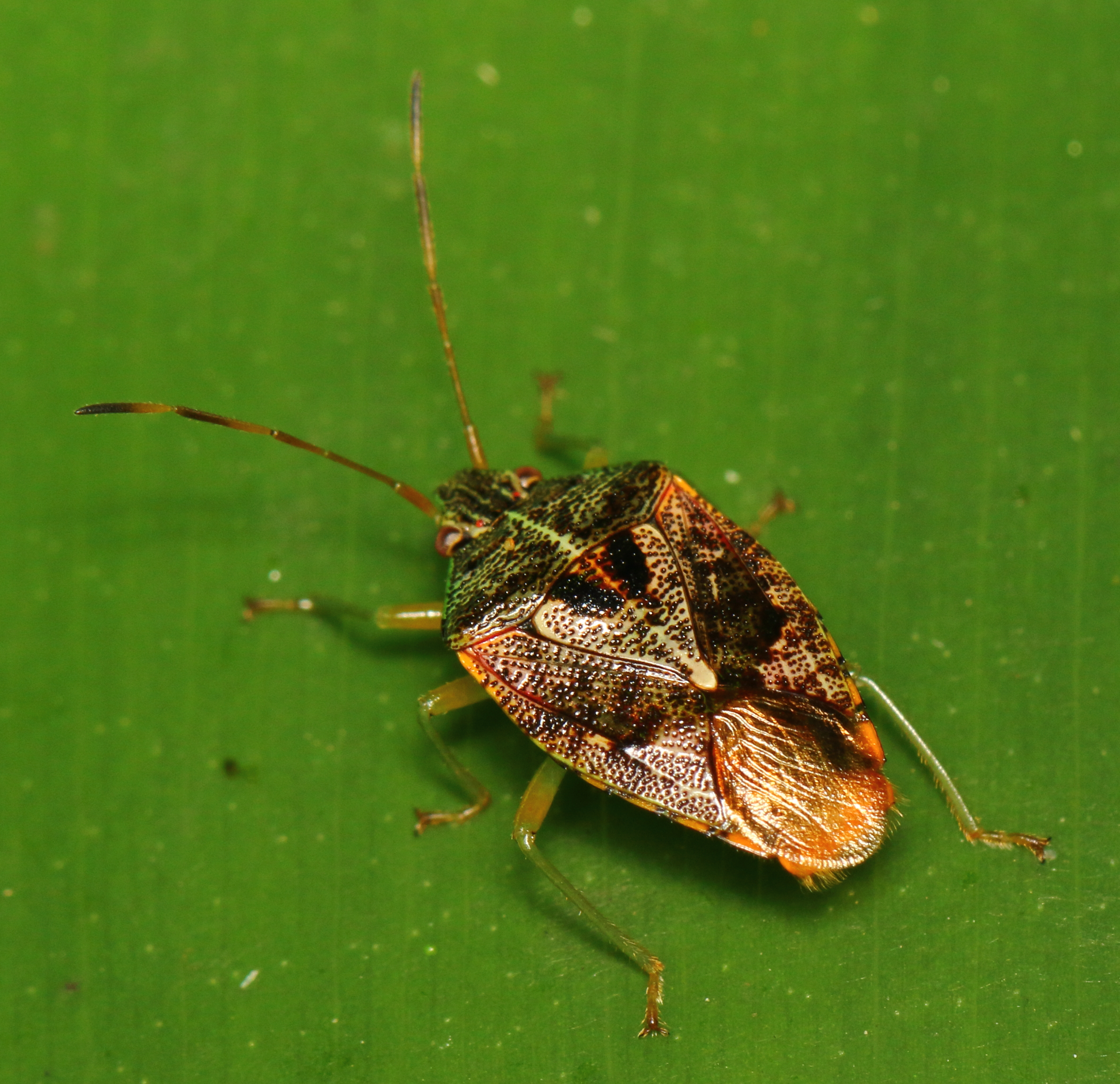
- Xosa fuscoirroratus

Scientific classification
- Domain: Eukaryota
- Kingdom: Animalia
- Phylum: Arthropoda
- Class: Insecta
- Order: Hemiptera
- Suborder: Heteroptera
- Family: Acanthosomatidae
- Genus: Xosa; Kirkaldy, 1904

Synonyms
- Rhaphigaster

= Xosa (bug) =

Genus of true bugs

Xosa is a genus of shield bugs belonging to the family Acanthosomatidae. The genus is endemic to South Africa.

== Species ==
- Xosa fuscoirroratus (Stål, 1853)
- Xosa lugubris (Thunberg, 1822)
