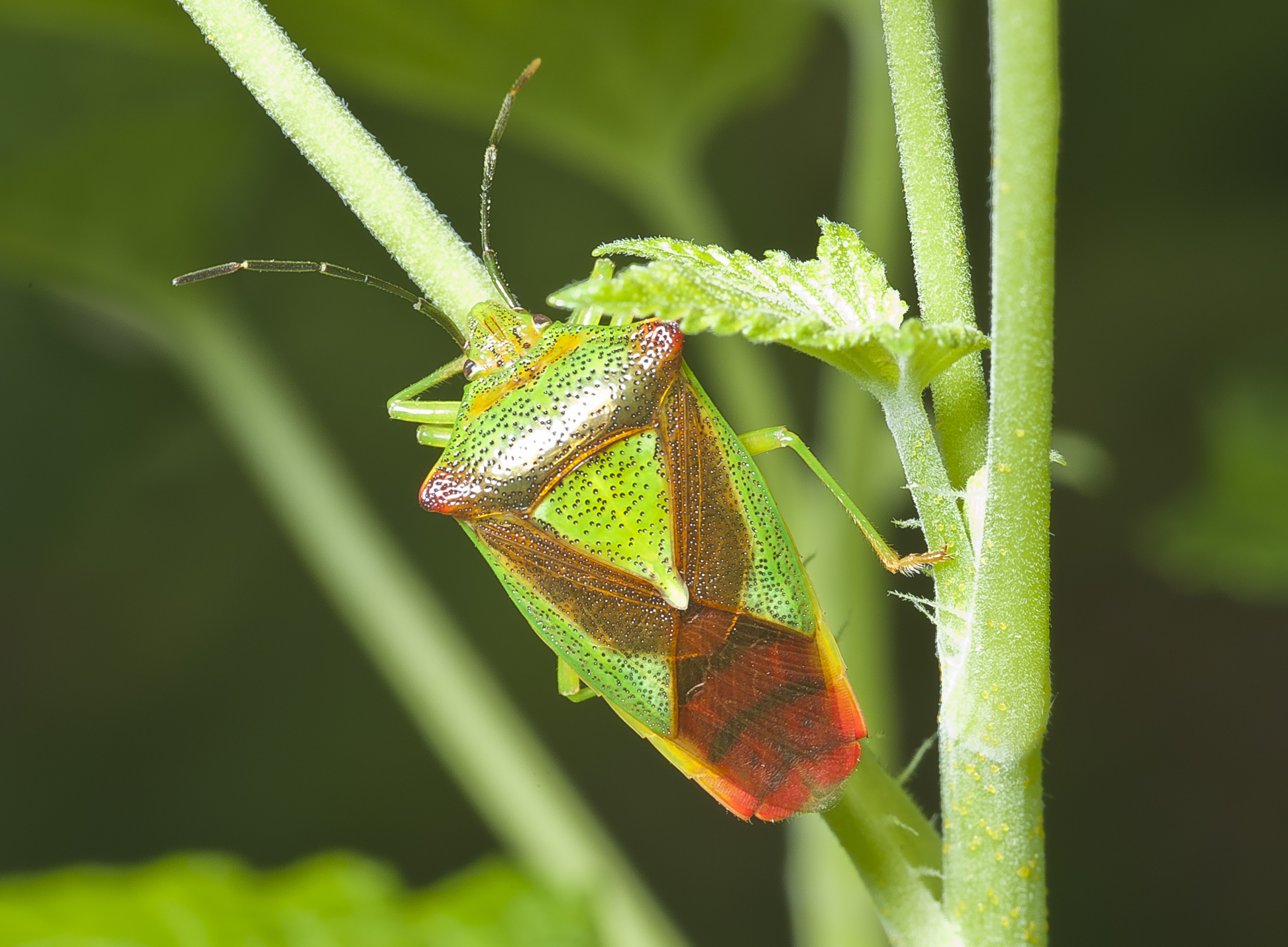
- Imago
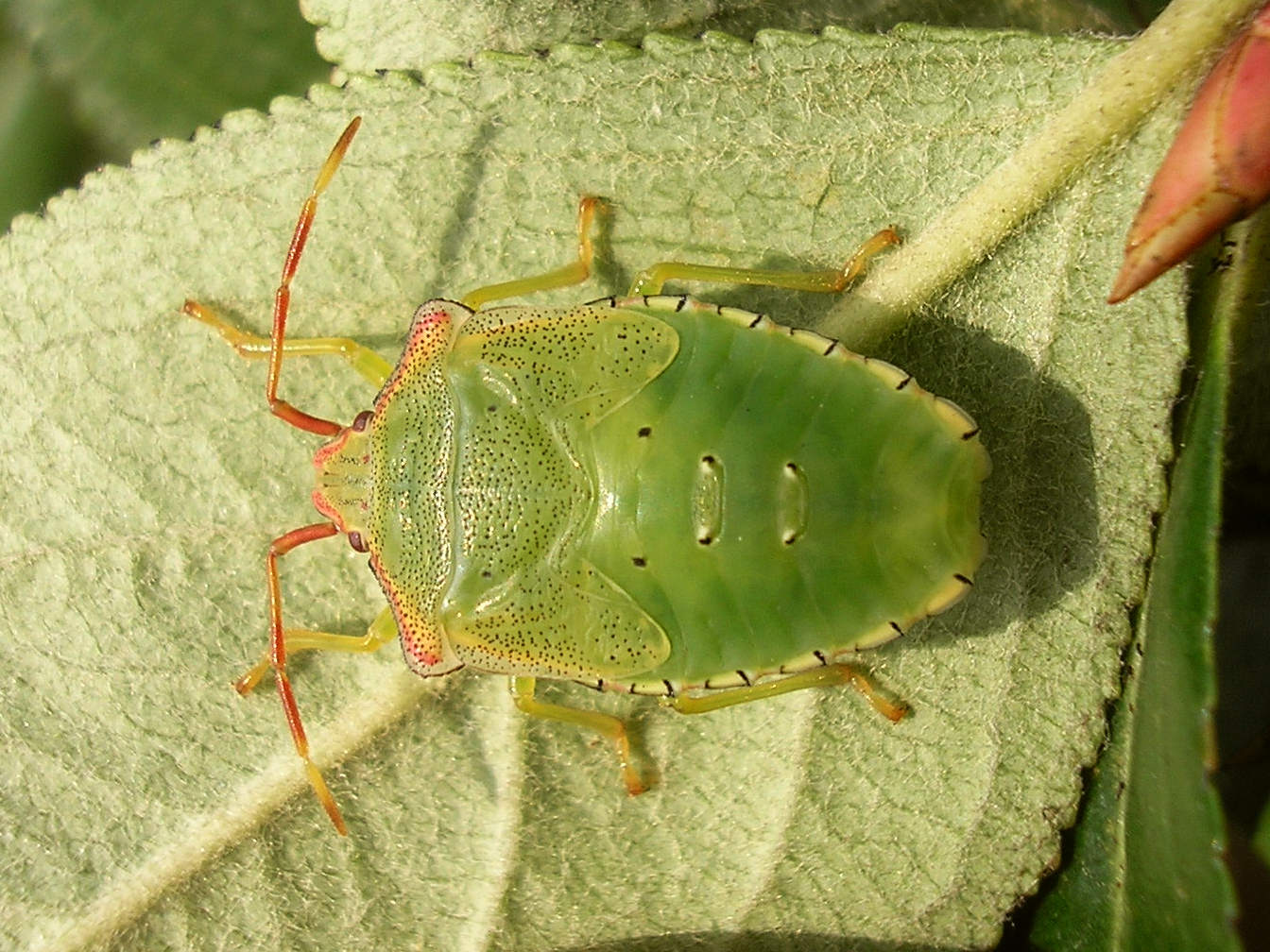
- Nymph

Scientific classification
- Kingdom: Animalia
- Phylum: Arthropoda
- Class: Insecta
- Order: Hemiptera
- Suborder: Heteroptera
- Family: Acanthosomatidae
- Genus: Acanthosoma
- Species: A. haemorrhoidale

Binomial name
- Acanthosoma haemorrhoidale (Linnaeus, 1758)

= Hawthorn shield bug =

Species of true bug

The hawthorn shield bug (Acanthosoma haemorrhoidale) is a common European shield bug. Its chief food is haws, the fruit of the hawthorn tree, but adults can overwinter on a diet of leaves, and individuals can be found on many potential food plants, including pedunculate oak, sessile oak and whitebeam. They may grow up to 17 mm (0.67 in) long, and are camouflaged in shades of green and brown. Like many so-called "stink bugs", they may release unpleasant odours when disturbed.

== Biology ==
The dark green scutellum band is trapezoidal in shape, and extends from the dorsal pronotum to the forewing hemelytral membrane which accounts for the final third of the main body length. The front wings lie flat when the insect is not flying, with the sclerotized pronotum and corium regions coloured dark red. The compound eyes are also red. There is a speckled pigmentation extending from the upper dorsal thorax to the abdominal region. The tarsi are 2-segmented and antennae 5-segmented. As a heteropteran herbivore of mainly green leafed trees and red berries, the species feeds by injecting saliva enzymes from the posterior section of the rostrum into plant tissue, partially digesting it, then sucks up the resulting liquid through the anterior section of the rostrum. The rostrum is a modified proboscis formed by the interlocking of mandibular and maxillary stylet into a double-tubed elongation covered by the labium. The structure is needle shaped and penetrates beyond the cuticle and epidermis layer to access the vascular tissue of the mesophyll layer of the leaf. The rostrum pricks into berries to access fruit sugars. As a stress response, A. haemorrhoidale can produce an orange secretion from gland openings in the thorax.

== Distribution and behaviour ==
The hawthorn shield bug is found across Europe, from Portugal to Russia, and is common in the southern part of Great Britain. Its distribution appears to be spreading north, being reported as far north as Manchester only in 1892, but having now extended its range to Northern England and even the Scottish Highlands.

In Britain and North Western Europe the species is generally active between the months of April and October, although specimens can reappear from hibernation during periods of unseasonable warm weather in the winter.

The hawthorn shield bug is a distinctive species, but could be confused with the birch shield bug, Elasmostethus interstinctus.

== See also ==
- List of shield bug species of Great Britain
