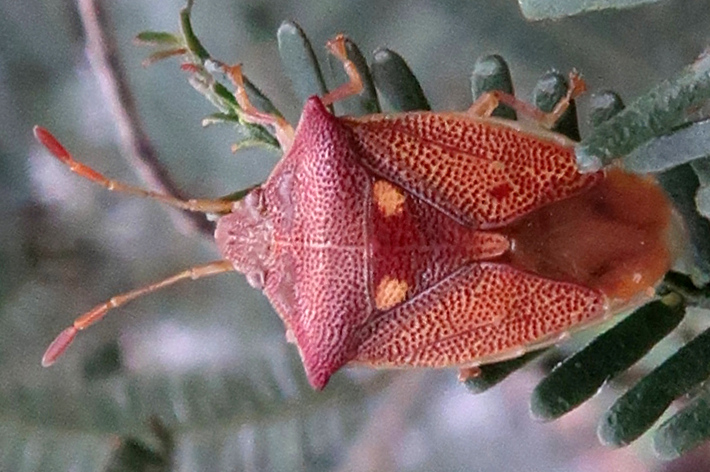
- Hiarchas angularis

Scientific classification
- Kingdom: Animalia
- Phylum: Arthropoda
- Class: Insecta
- Order: Hemiptera
- Suborder: Heteroptera
- Family: Acanthosomatidae
- Genus: Hiarchas; Distant, 1910

= Hiarchas =

Genus of true bugs

Hiarchas is a genus of shield bugs belonging to the family Acanthosomatidae. The genus is endemic to Australia.

== Description ==
Bugs of this genus range from 8.20 to 10.88 mm in length. The general colour is yellow with red terga. The antennal segments and tarsi are red in Hiarchas crassicornis but mostly yellowish in other species. On the underside of the body, the prosternum has a deep median groove bordered laterally by longitudinal flaps, and the abdomen has a long and flat spine reaching forward to the prosternal groove. This genus resembles Mochus, Duadicus, Monteithiessa and Andriscus in having a prosternal groove, but differs from them in the humeral angles of the pronotum not being laterally produced. It is also similar to Stauralia, from which it differs by having a scutellum that is very broad basally (as opposed to being almost triangular in Stauralia) and narrow distally.

== Species ==
- Hiarchas angularis (Reuter, 1881)
- Hiarchas bifasciculatus (Reuter, 1881)
- Hiarchas crassicornis (Walker, 1867)
- Hiarchas terminalis (Walker, 1867)
