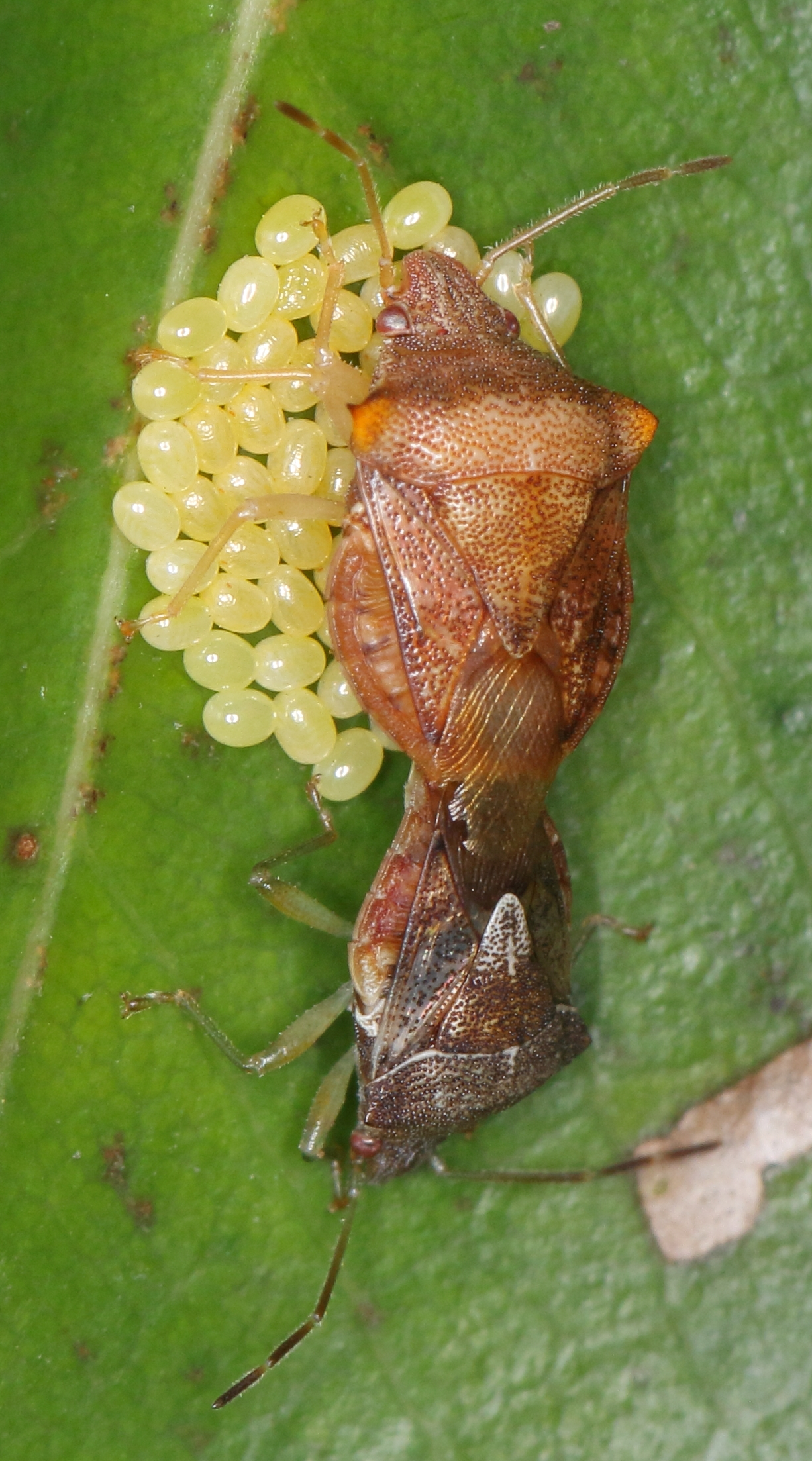

Scientific classification
- Domain: Eukaryota
- Kingdom: Animalia
- Phylum: Arthropoda
- Class: Insecta
- Order: Hemiptera
- Suborder: Heteroptera
- Family: Acanthosomatidae
- Subfamily: Ditomotarsinae
- Genus: Uhlunga; Distant, 1892
- Species: U. typica

Binomial name
- Uhlunga typica Distant, 1892

= Uhlunga =

Genus of true bugs

Uhlunga is a monotypic genus of shield bugs belonging to the family Acanthosomatidae. The only species is Uhlunga typica, which is known from Ghana, Nigeria, Kenya, Namibia, and South Africa.
