= Sangarius paradoxus =

Sangarius

Scientific classification
- Kingdom: Animalia
- Phylum: Arthropoda
- Clade: Pancrustacea
- Class: Insecta
- Order: Hemiptera
- Suborder: Heteroptera
- Family: Acanthosomatidae
- Subfamily: Ditomotarsinae
- Genus: Sangarius
- Species: S. paradoxus

Binomial name
- Sangarius paradoxus Stål, 1865

Genus of true bugs

Sangarius is an genus of Australian shield bugs in the family Acanthosomatidae and subfamily Ditomotarsinae. The single type species is Sangarius paradoxus Stål, 1866, which feeds on Hakea shrubs.
