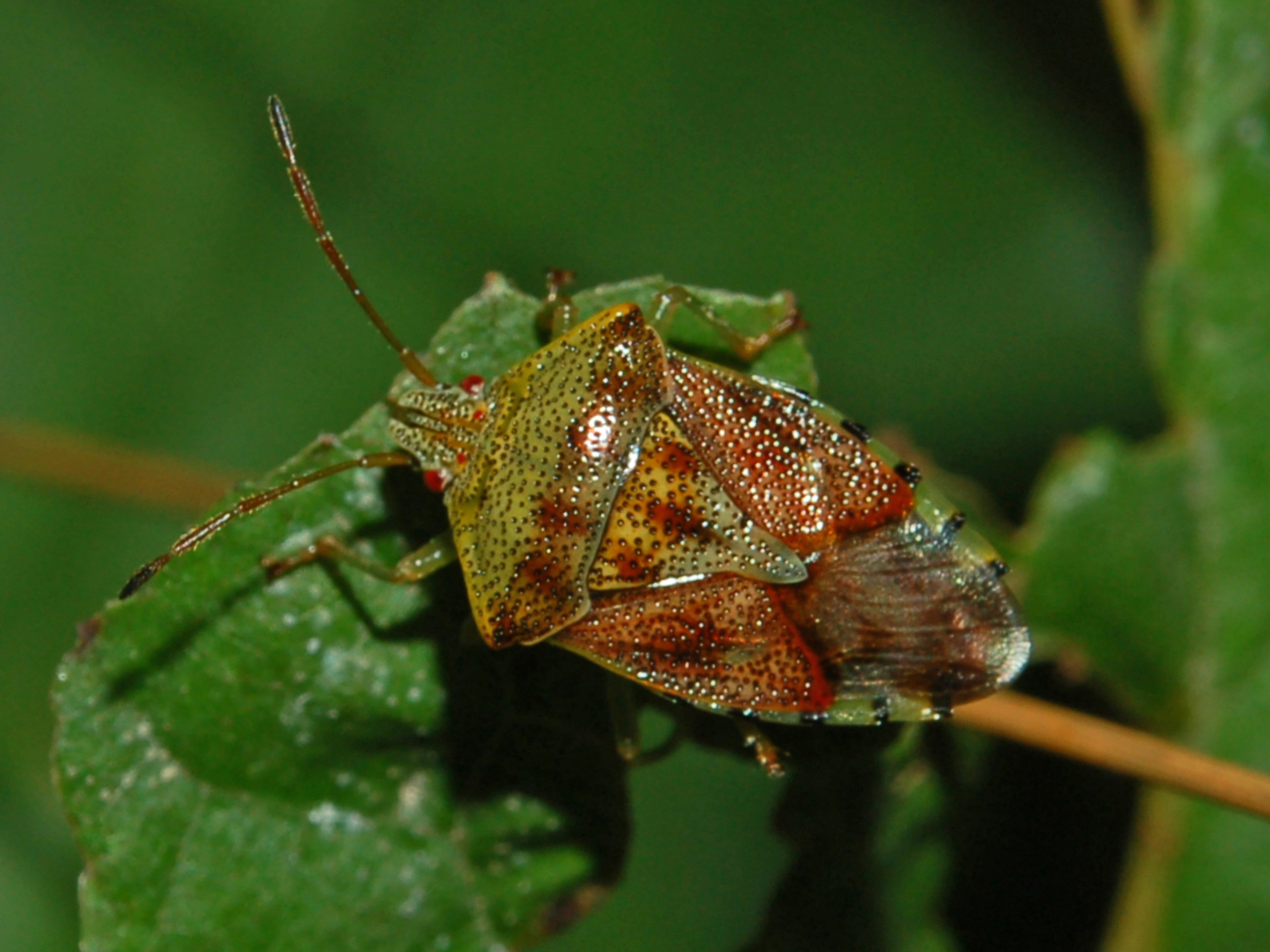
- Elasmucha grisea

Scientific classification
- Kingdom: Animalia
- Phylum: Arthropoda
- Clade: Pancrustacea
- Class: Insecta
- Order: Hemiptera
- Suborder: Heteroptera
- Family: Acanthosomatidae
- Genus: Elasmucha
- Species: E. grisea

Binomial name
- Elasmucha grisea (Linnaeus, 1758)

Synonyms
- Cimex grisea Linnaeus, 1758

= Parent bug =

Species of true bug

Elasmucha grisea, common name parent bug, is a species of shield bugs or stink bugs belonging to the family Acanthosomatidae. The term parent bugs includes also the other species of the genus Elasmucha and some species of the family Acanthosomatidae.

== Subspecies ==
Subspecies within Elasmucha grisea include:

- Elasmucha grisea cypria Josifov, 1971
- Elasmucha grisea grisea (Linnaeus, 1758)

== Distribution ==
Elasmucha grisea is a rather common and widespread species present in most of Europe.

== Description ==
Elasmucha grisea can reach a length of 6.5–8.8 millimetres (0.26–0.35 in). Males are smaller than females. These medium-sized shield bugs are usually brown-reddish, but there are also gray (hence the Latin species name grisea) and green-brown specimens. The connexiva are black and white. The upper side is covered with several dark dots. The scutellum usually shows an evident black patch. The ventral face is largely punctuated with black. The lateral corners of the pronotum are simply beveled. The front corners of the pronotum show a more pronounced tooth. Antennae are blackish in the male, dark brown in the female.

This species, like other parent bugs, possesses metathoracic and abdominal glands, which discharge a foul smelling secretion. This secretion is used to deter potential enemies and is sometimes released when the bug is disturbed.

== Life cycle ==
Adults of E. grisea can be found all year around. In fact, this species overwinters as an adult. Mating occurs in the spring and new adults can be found in August. These shield bugs feed on various woody plants, preferably on birch (Betula sp.), but also on alder (Alnus sp.), beech (Fagus sp.), holly (Ilex sp.), spruce (Picea sp.), etc. Like most shield bugs, E. grisea and other parent bugs suck plant sap and require symbiotic bacteria for their digestion. They obtain symbionts at an early age: the mother covers her eggs with bacteria so that the nymphs ingest them as they feed on the egg case. Both adults and nymphs readily feed on developing seeds, and breeding individuals can be observed on host plants with many young catkins. However, they seem to avoid trees with a high predation risk.

== Parental care ==
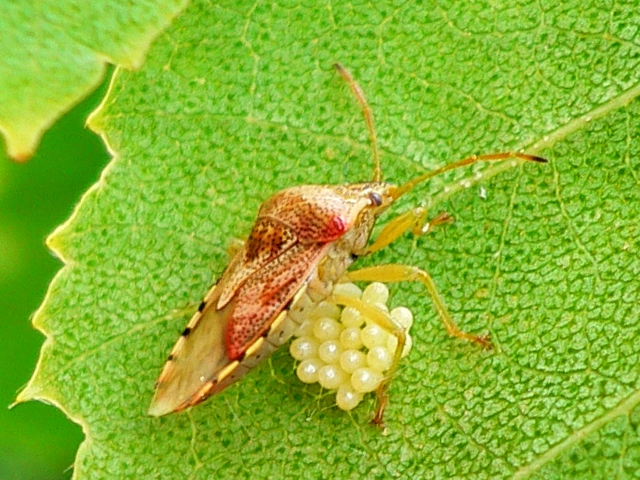
Elasmucha grisea with eggs

The common name of "parent bug" comes from the relatively rare insect behaviour of prolonged caring for eggs and juveniles, exhibited by females of this species. Predators, such as bugs, beetles, earwigs and ants, can eliminate all the offspring of the parent bug if there is no maternal care. The repertoire of female defensive behaviours includes wing fanning, body jerking, tilting towards the enemy and, finally, releasing of 'nasty' odours from the scent glands,

After oviposition, the parent bug female stands over the egg batch and shields it throughout egg development. Predation appears to limit the clutch size in E. grisea. Experiments have shown that large females lay larger egg clutches than small females. However, when the clutch size was manipulated, small females protecting large clutches lost significantly more eggs than large females guarding small clutches or females in the control groups (guarding clutches of optimal size).

After hatching, nymphs of the parent bug remain in a tight aggregation, feeding on their empty egg shells. When any nymph tries to abandon the aggregation, the female tilts her body, stretches her antennae to reach the nymph and pushes the nymph back to the aggregation. During the second and third instar they move, for food, towards catkins then back to the leaf with the female in close attendance. The female keeps a lookout for the nymphs constantly and manages them with touches of her antennae. Finally, nymphs form smaller groups and disperse at the end of the third instar, at which point the female leaves them.

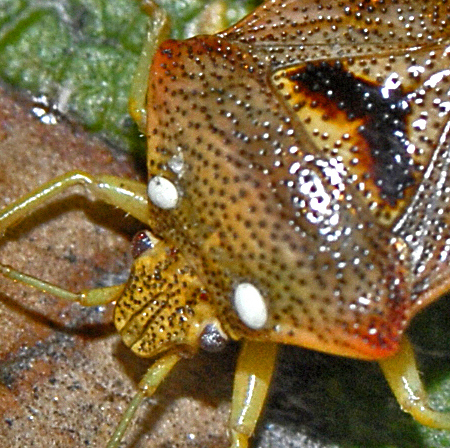
E. grisea with the white eggs of Subclytia rotundiventris on pronotum

It has been noted that, in E. grisea, moultings during the early instar stages can be asynchronous. While some nymphs are still at the first instar stage, others have already moulted to the stage of second instar larvae and abandon the brood leaf for food. Under such circumstances, the female is no longer able to provide effective protection for all her nymphs. The offspring of different females make contact with each other and form mixed groups. There is no kin-recognition in this species. Both single and joint guarding females provide parental care for their own nymphs or other females' offspring. Nymphs are likely to benefit from 'kindergartens', when their mothers disappear or die. Moreover, joint-guarding females defend the egg clutches much more successfully than single females.

The tachinid fly, Subclytia rotundiventris, is a specialist endoparasite of the parent bug females. The parasite inserts a single egg through the upper prothorax of an E. grisea female and, after hatching, the larva feeds on its host. At the beginning the parasite feeds only on the non-vital parts of the bug, but finally it kills it and pupates outside the host. The larva ‘permits’ the parent bug to continue caring for the juveniles until their third stage. In experiments, the wing-fanning (regarded as the most effective defensive behaviour of the parent bug) did not differ significantly between parasited and non-parasited females until the nymphs were at the second instar stage. However, with older nymphs, females were much less effective in their defensive behaviour and often died before the end of maternal care. Considering that the older nymphs are more mobile and may escape from predators, some offspring of the parasited females of the parent bug probably survive and may also be potential hosts for the new generation of the parasite.

== Gallery ==
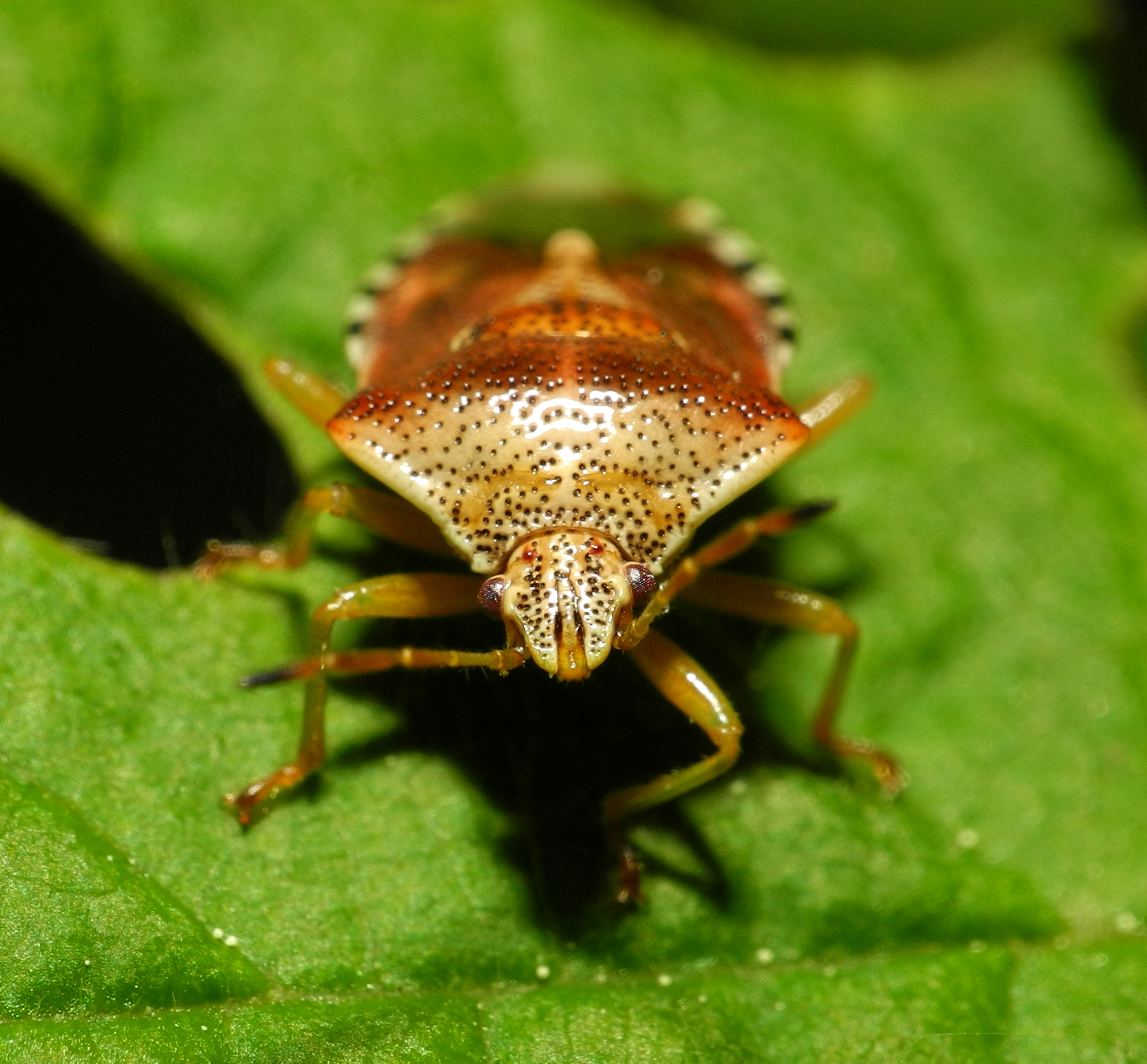
Front view

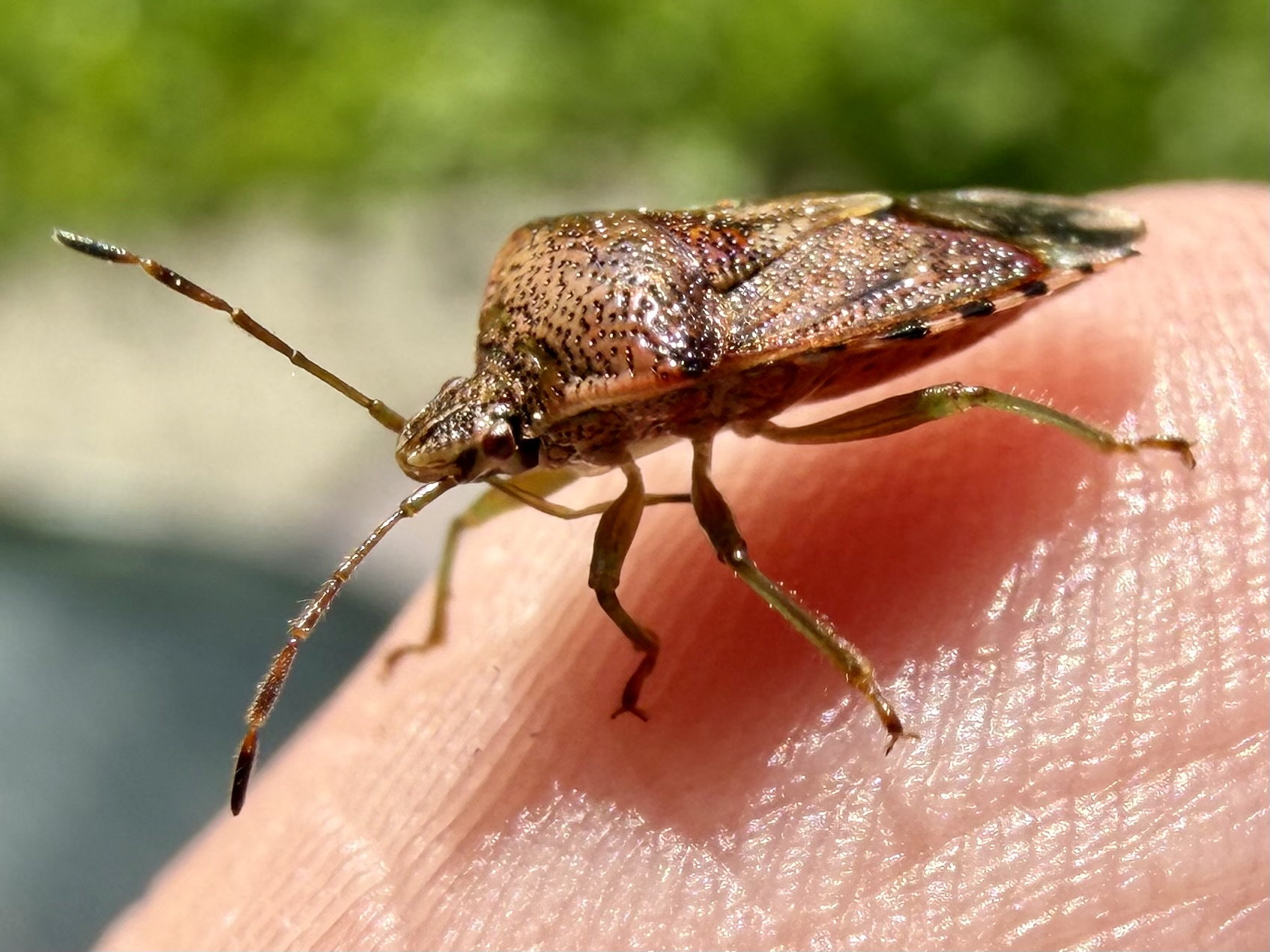
Side view

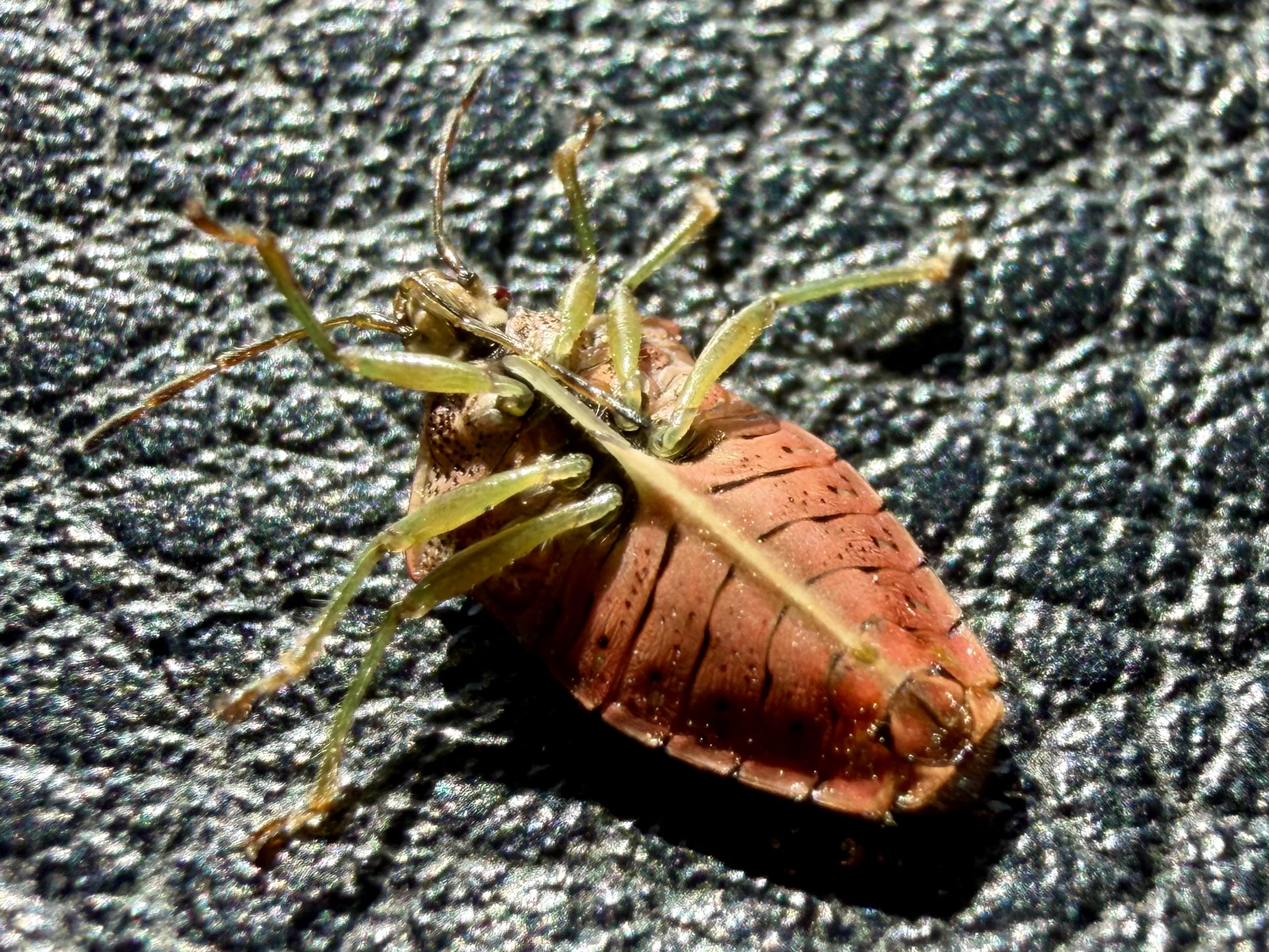
Ventral view

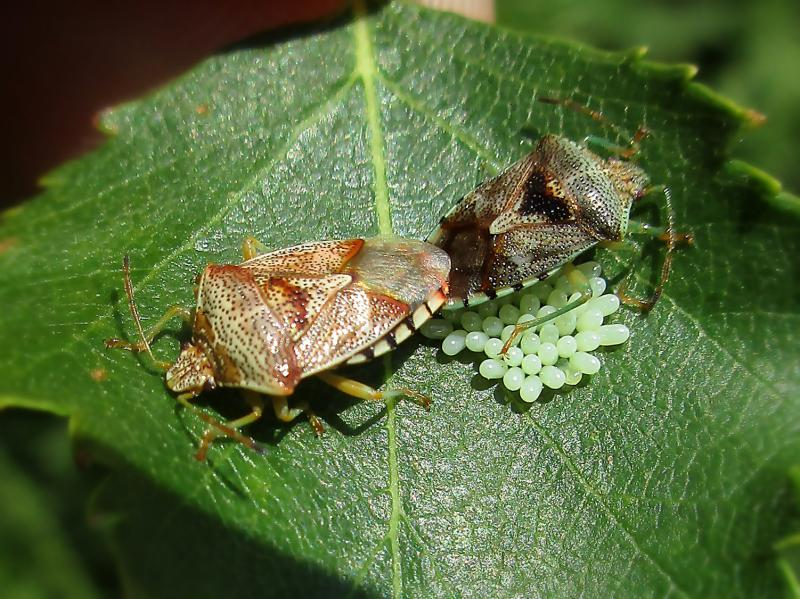
Elasmucha grisea with eggs

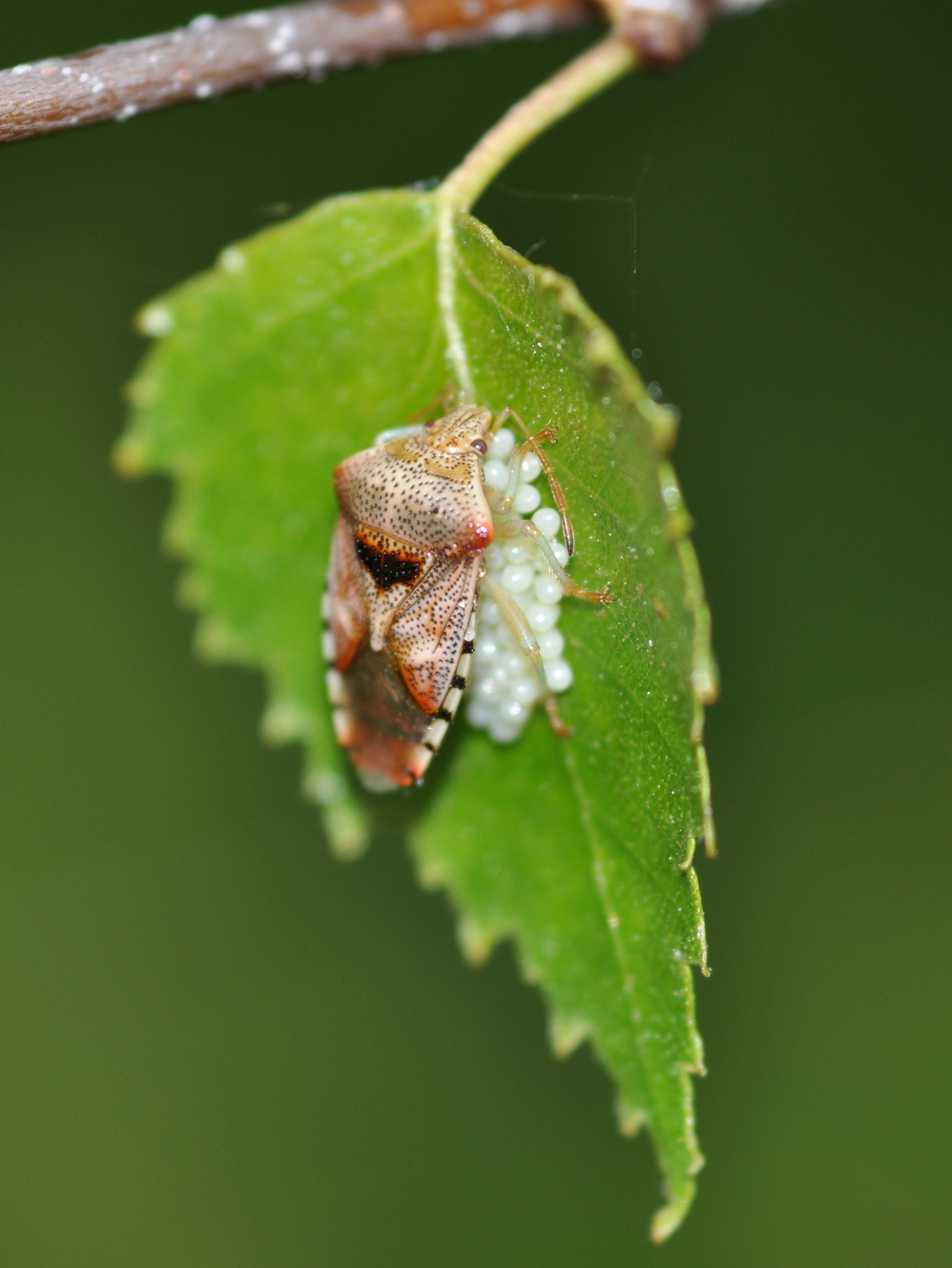
A female guarding her nest

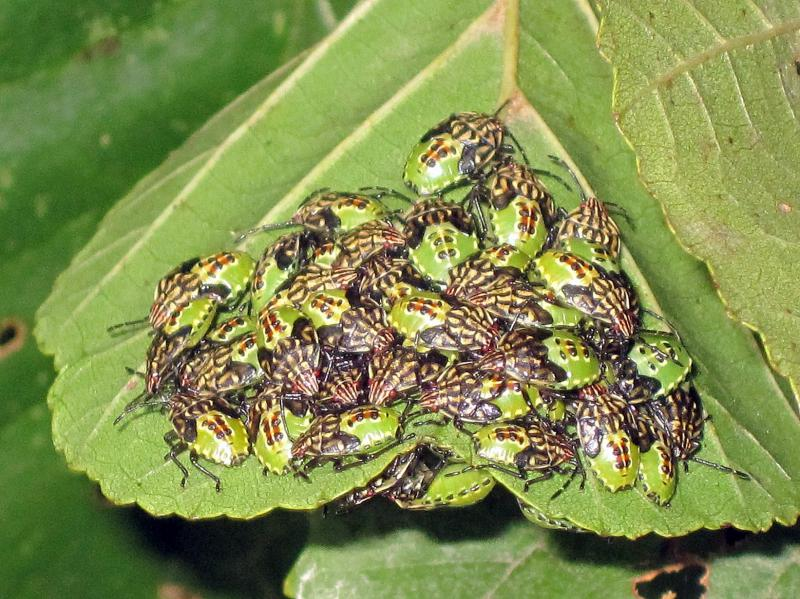
Aggregation of nymphs

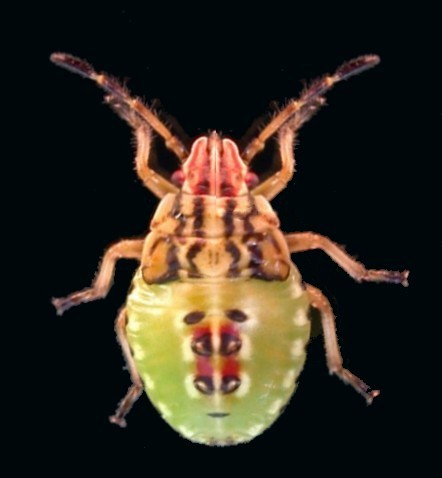
Young nymph

== See also ==
- List of shield bug species of Great Britain
