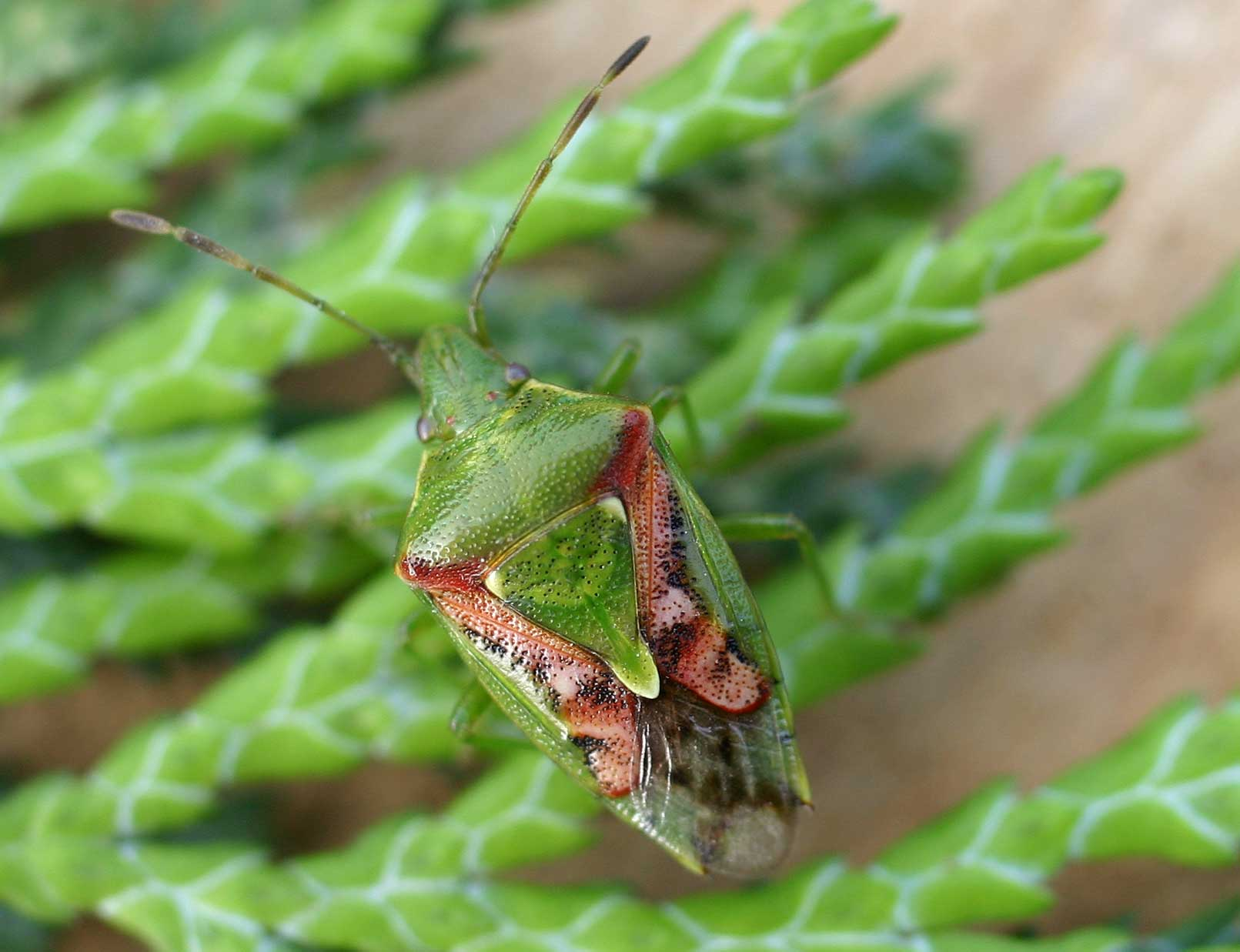

Scientific classification
- Domain: Eukaryota
- Kingdom: Animalia
- Phylum: Arthropoda
- Class: Insecta
- Order: Hemiptera
- Suborder: Heteroptera
- Family: Acanthosomatidae
- Genus: Cyphostethus; Fieber, 1860

= Cyphostethus =

Genus of true bugs

Cyphostethus is a genus of true bugs belonging to the family Acanthosomatidae.

The species of this genus are found in Europe.

Species:

- Cyphostethus japonicus Hasegawa, 1959
- Cyphostethus ministristriatus Ahmad & Onder, 1993
- Cyphostethus pallidus Ahmad & Onder, 1993
- Cyphostethus sinensis Schumacher, 1912
- Cyphostethus tristriatus (Fabricius, 1787)
- Cyphostethus yunnanensis Liu, 1981
