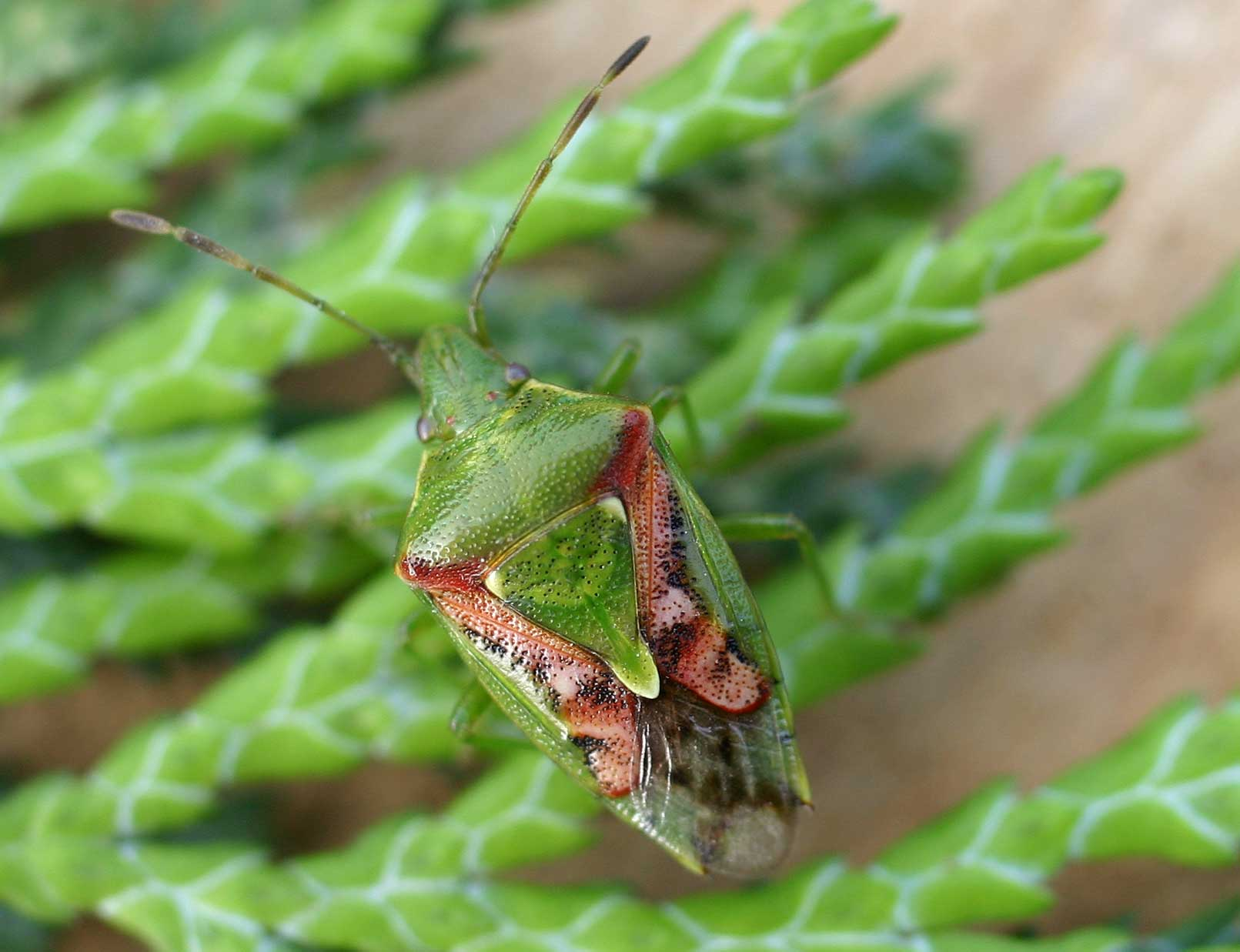

Scientific classification
- Domain: Eukaryota
- Kingdom: Animalia
- Phylum: Arthropoda
- Class: Insecta
- Order: Hemiptera
- Suborder: Heteroptera
- Family: Acanthosomatidae
- Genus: Cyphostethus
- Species: C. tristriatus

Binomial name
- Cyphostethus tristriatus (Fieber, 1860)

= Juniper shield bug =

Species of true bug

The juniper shield bug (Cyphostethus tristriatus), (family: Acanthosomatidae), is a large (9–10.5 mm) green shield bug with distinctive pinkish-red markings on the corium.

The bug's traditional foodplant is juniper, with the larvae feeding on juniper berries. It has also adapted to use Lawson cypress(Chamaecyparis spp.) as a host. In the United Kingdom it was formerly scarce and restricted largely to southern juniper woodlands but in recent years it has become common across southern and central England as a result of the widespread garden planting of juniper and cypress. Recent discoveries on stands of juniper in northern England and Scotland suggest that the range of the species may be extending.

The juniper shield bug is active for most of the year apart from the coldest months. It overwinters as an adult, emerging to mate in the early spring. New adults may be found from late August onwards.

== See also ==
- List of shield bug species of Great Britain
