= Mahea =

Scientific classification
- Kingdom: Animalia
- Phylum: Arthropoda
- Clade: Pancrustacea
- Class: Insecta
- Order: Hemiptera
- Suborder: Heteroptera
- Family: Acanthosomatidae
- Subfamily: Acanthosomatinae
- Genus: Mahea; Distant, 1909

Genus of insects

Mahea is a genus of shield bugs in the subfamily Acanthosomatinae, erected by William Lucas Distant in 1909.

== Species ==
Biolib includes:

1. Mahea andriai (Cachan, 1952)
2. Mahea distanti Kment, 2005
3. Mahea durrelli Kment, 2005
4. Mahea parvula Kment, 2005
5. Mahea sexualis Distant, 1909
