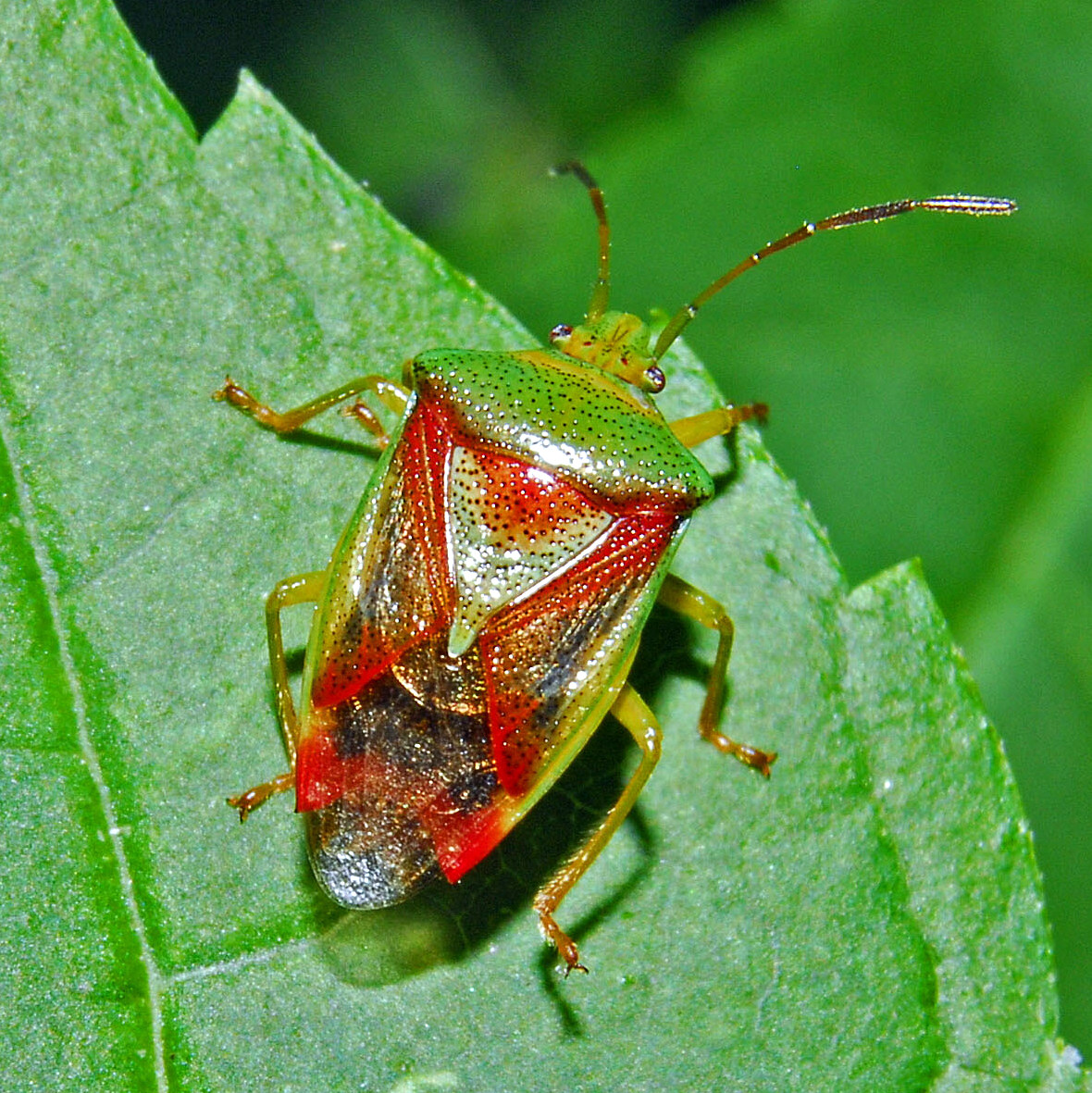
- Dorsal view
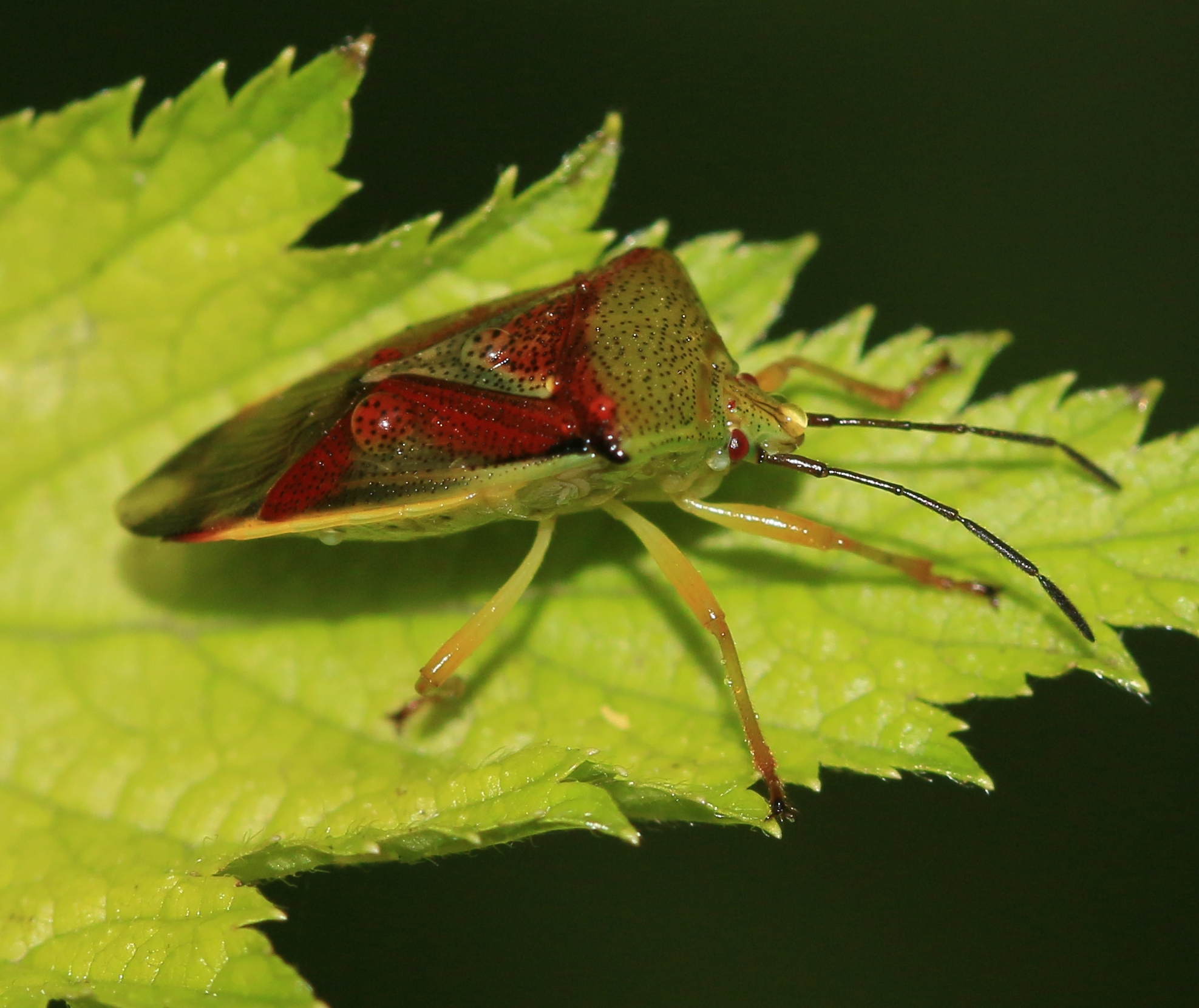
- Side view

Scientific classification
- Kingdom: Animalia
- Phylum: Arthropoda
- Class: Insecta
- Order: Hemiptera
- Suborder: Heteroptera
- Family: Acanthosomatidae
- Genus: Elasmostethus
- Species: E. interstinctus

Binomial name
- Elasmostethus interstinctus (Linnaeus, 1758)

Synonyms
- Cimex interstinctus Linnaeus, 1758; Elasmostethus dentatus (De Geer, 1773)

= Elasmostethus interstinctus =

Species of true bug

Elasmostethus interstinctus, the birch shield bug, is species of shield bug in the Acanthosomatidae family. Shield bugs are often called "stink bugs" because they excrete a foul smelling liquid that is used to deter predators.

== Distribution ==
This rather common species has an holarctic range. It is widely distributed across Europe, Northern Asia (excluding China) and in North America.

== Habitat ==
These shield bugs mainly inhabit sunny areas with mixed birch woodlands, deciduous trees and shrubs.

== Description ==
Elasmostethus interstinctus can reach a length of 8–11.5 millimetres (0.31–0.45 in). These shield bugs have a relatively flat body with the entire upper surface covered with mostly black punctures. The dorsal side is a bright yellow-green, with various red markings. In particular, pronotum is yellow-green, scutellum is green with a red center, clavus and corium are intensely red and the apex of the elytra are also bright red. The ventral side and the abdominal margins are yellow. Legs are yellow-green.

This species of shield bug can be confused with the Hawthorn Shield Bug (Acanthosoma haemorrhoidale), which is larger and more elongate and has a smaller lateral extensions of the pronotum.

== Biology ==
The species overwinters in an adult stage in leaf litter, after which they emerge in the spring and start to mate. From early June to the middle August eggs are laid on the upper side of leaves of and on the catkins of birch, where the nymphs feed in aggregation. Their larvae feed usually on birch, but could also be found on aspen and hazel. They have also been found feeding on various other host plants, mainly on juniper, Quercus, Ilex, Vaccinium, Alnus, Fagus and Populus species. The new generation is complete by August.

== Bibliography ==
- Henry, Thomas J., and Richard C. Froeschner, eds. (1988), Catalog of the Heteroptera, or True Bugs, of Canada and the Continental United States
- Thomas, Donald B. (1991) The Acanthosomatidae (Heteroptera) of North America, The Pan-Pacific Entomologist, vol. 67, no. 3
- Ekkehard Wachmann: Wanzen beobachten - kennenlernen. J. Neumann - Neudamm, Melsungen 1989, ISBN 3-7888-0554-4.

== Gallery ==
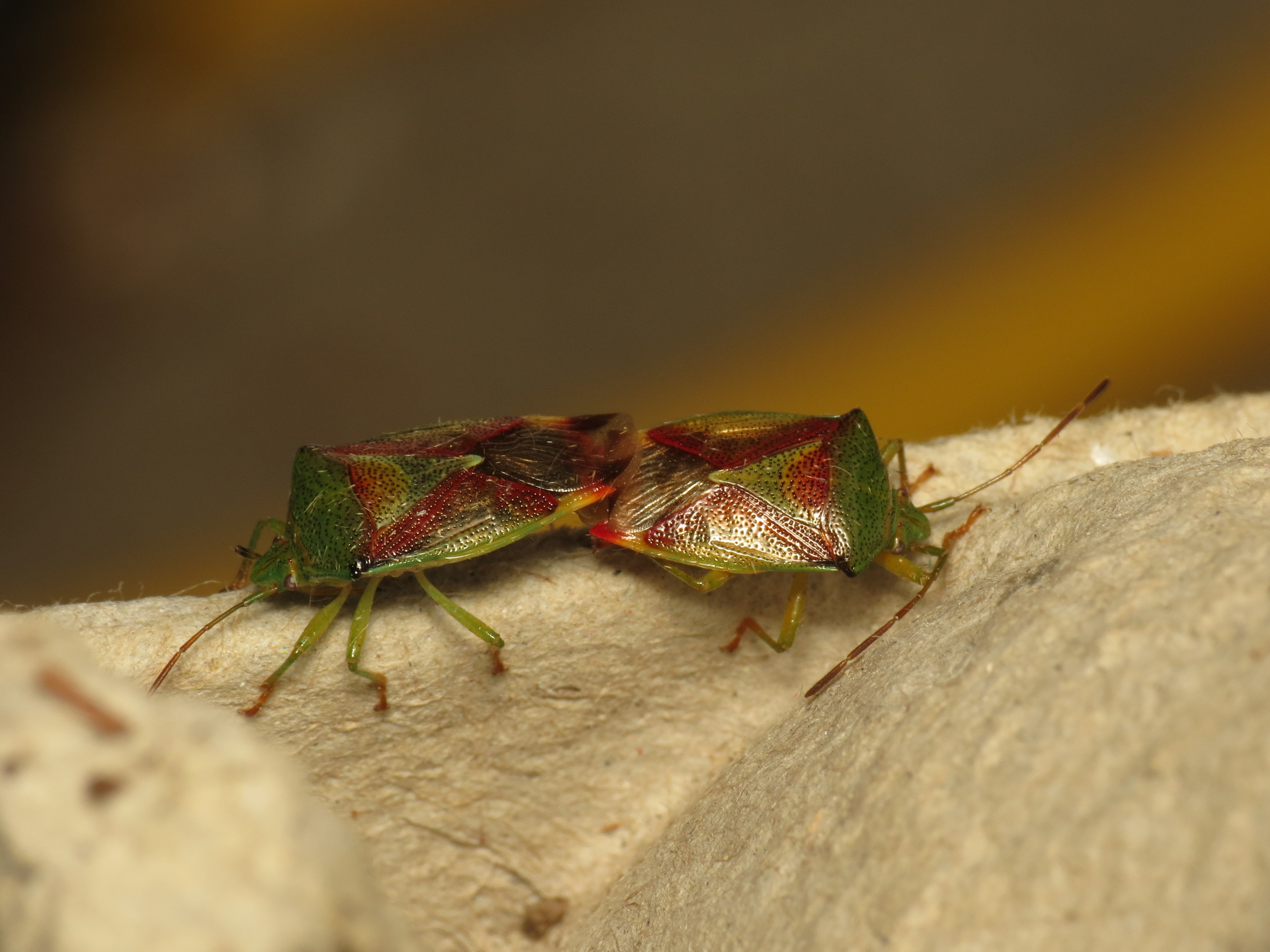
Mating

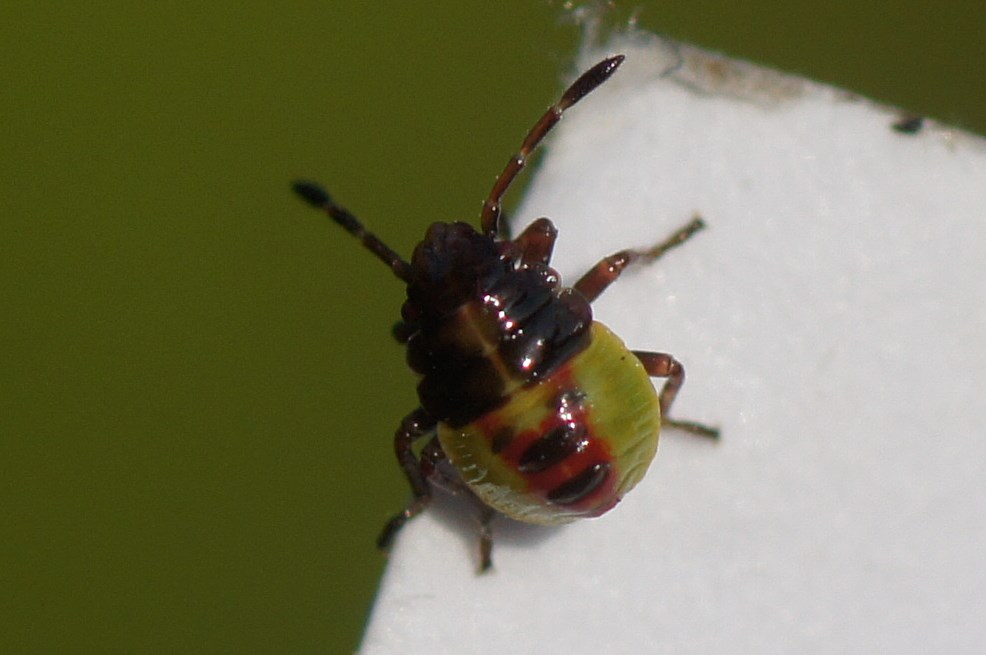
1st instar nymph

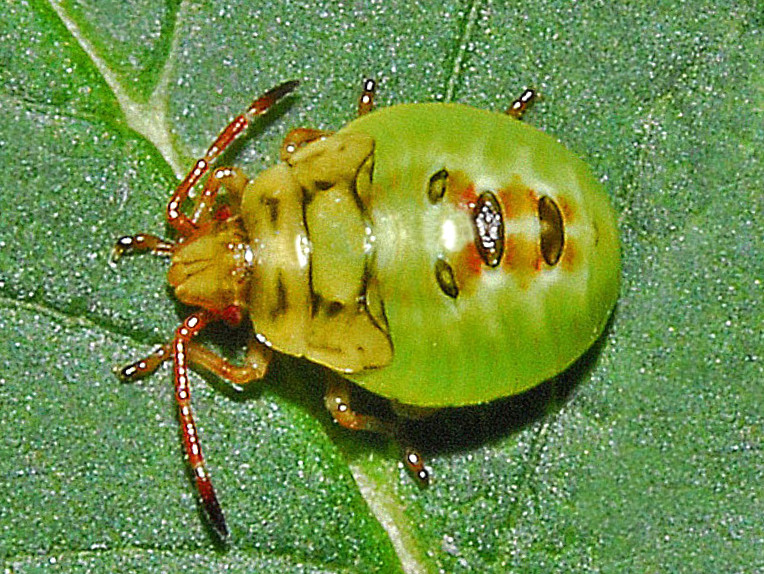
4th instar

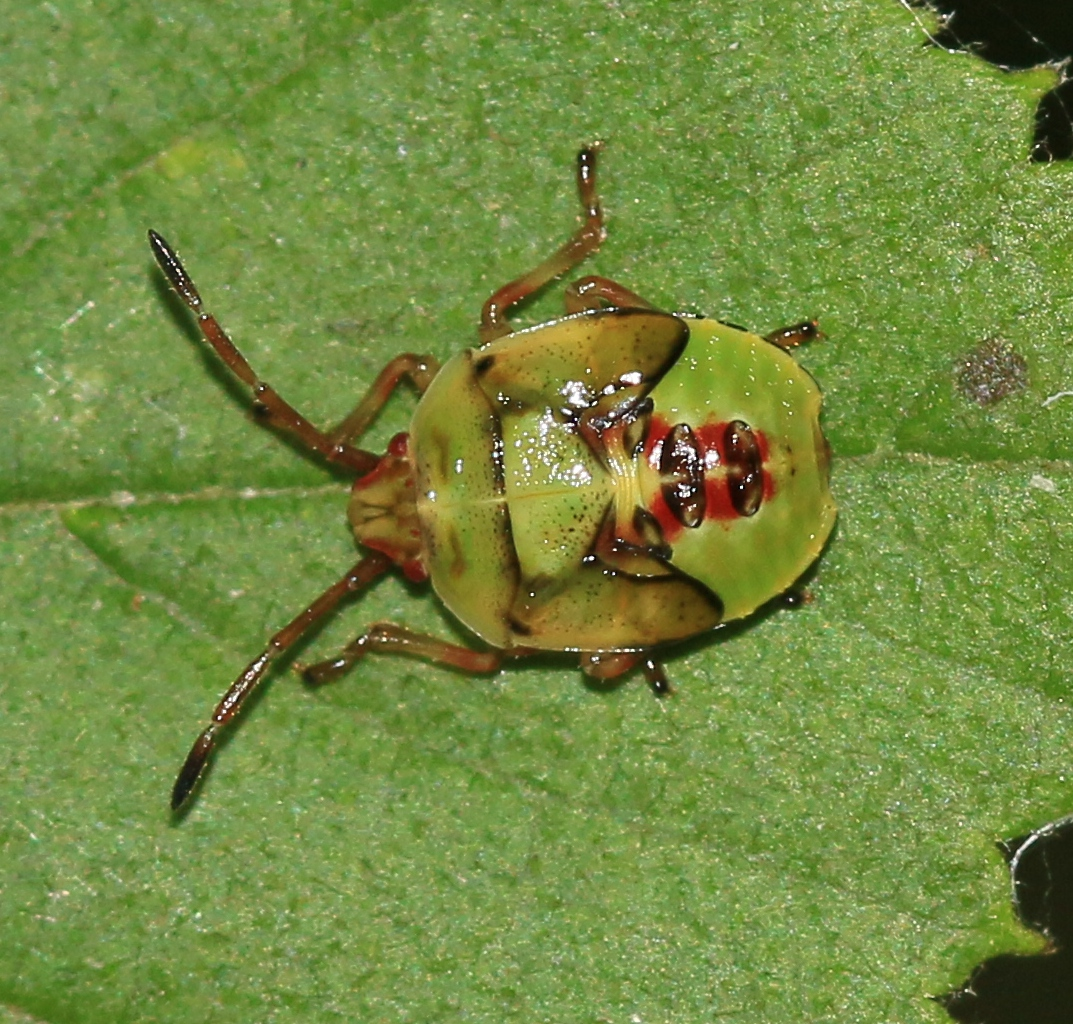
Last instar

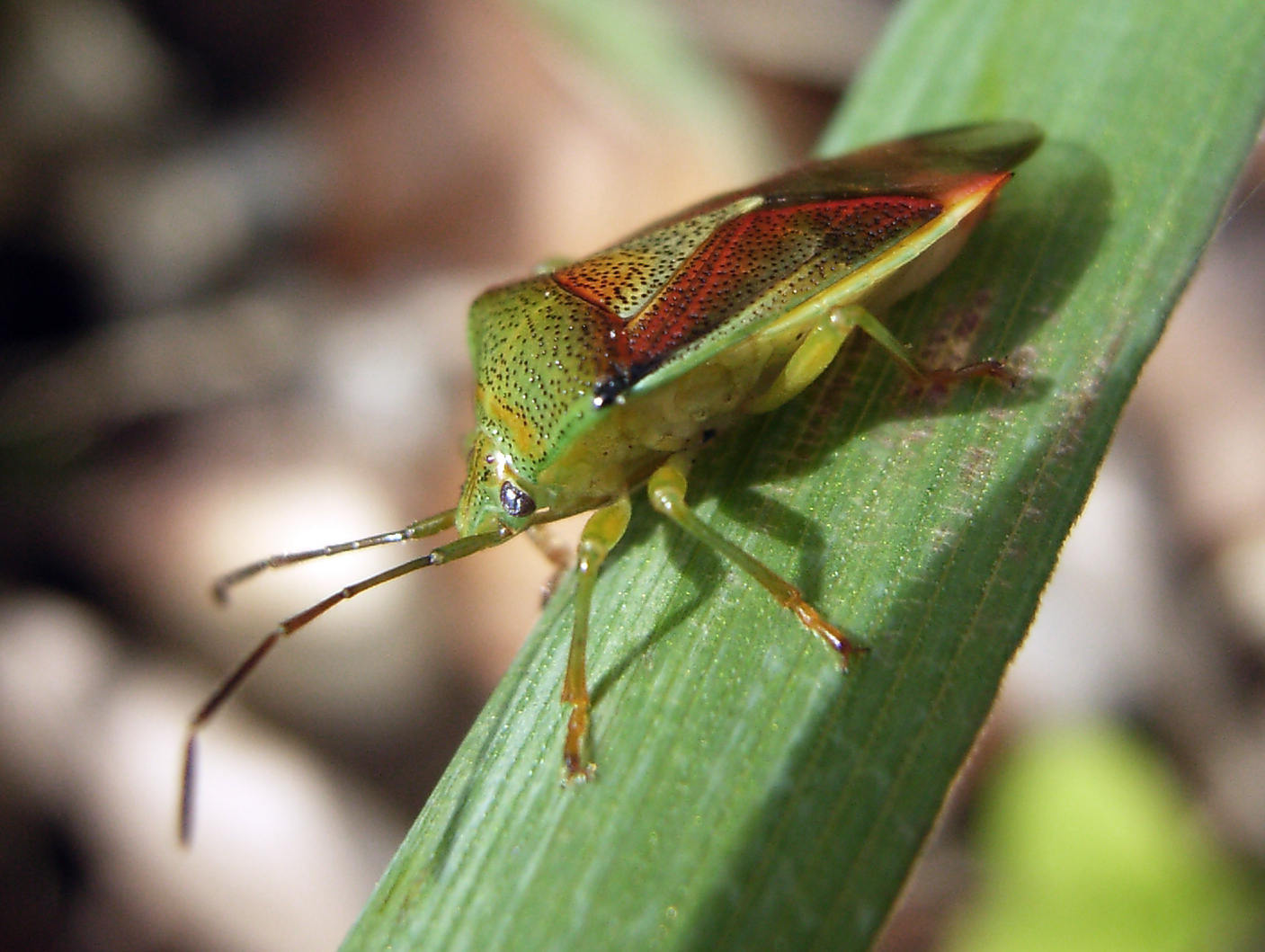
Mature
