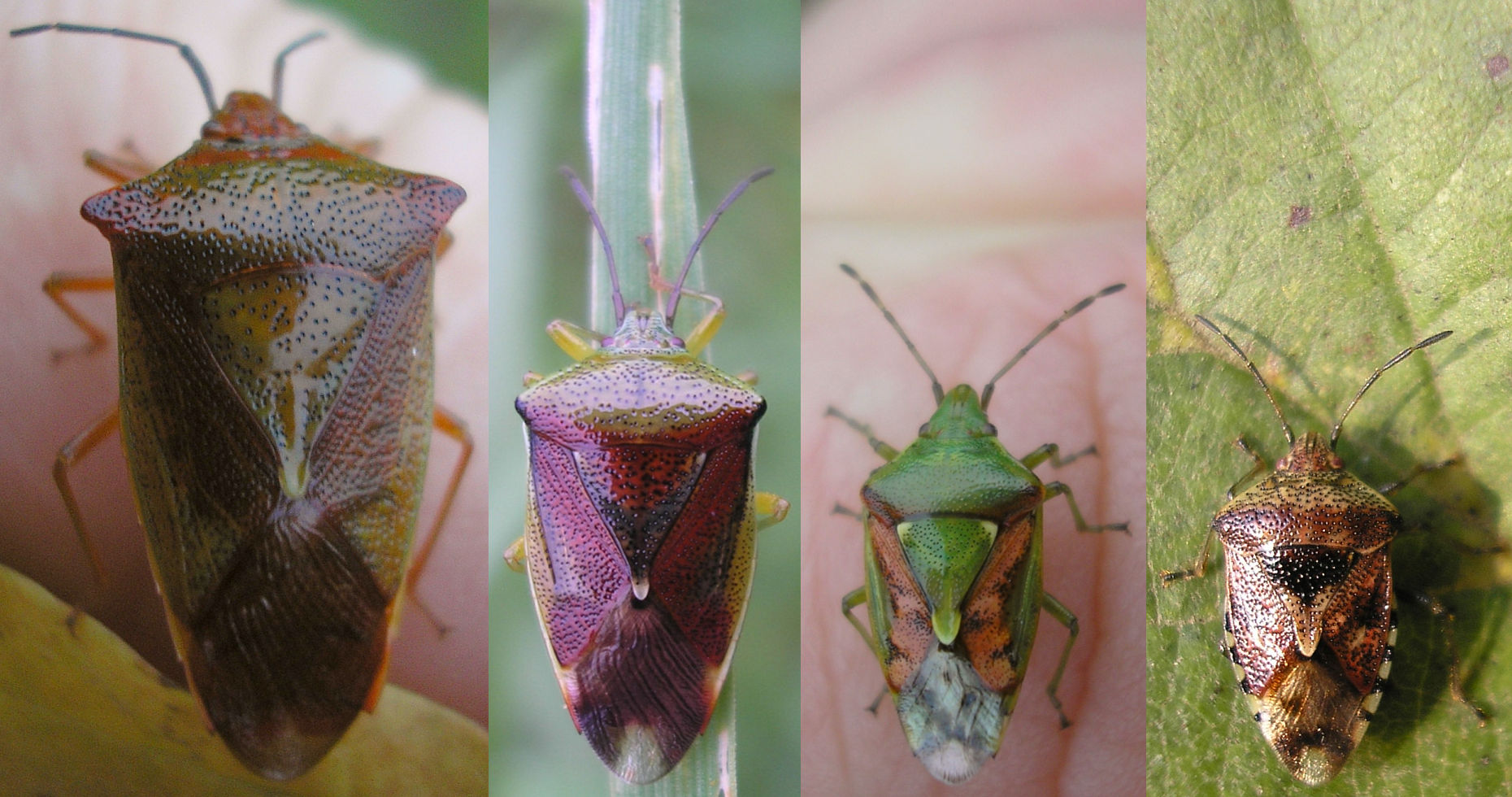
- Acanthosomatidae - relative sizes

Scientific classification
- Kingdom: Animalia
- Phylum: Arthropoda
- Clade: Pancrustacea
- Class: Insecta
- Order: Hemiptera
- Suborder: Heteroptera
- Superfamily: Pentatomoidea
- Family: Acanthosomatidae; Signoret, 1864

Subfamilies
- Acanthosomatinae; Blaudusinae; Ditomotarsinae

= Acanthosomatidae =

Family of true bugs

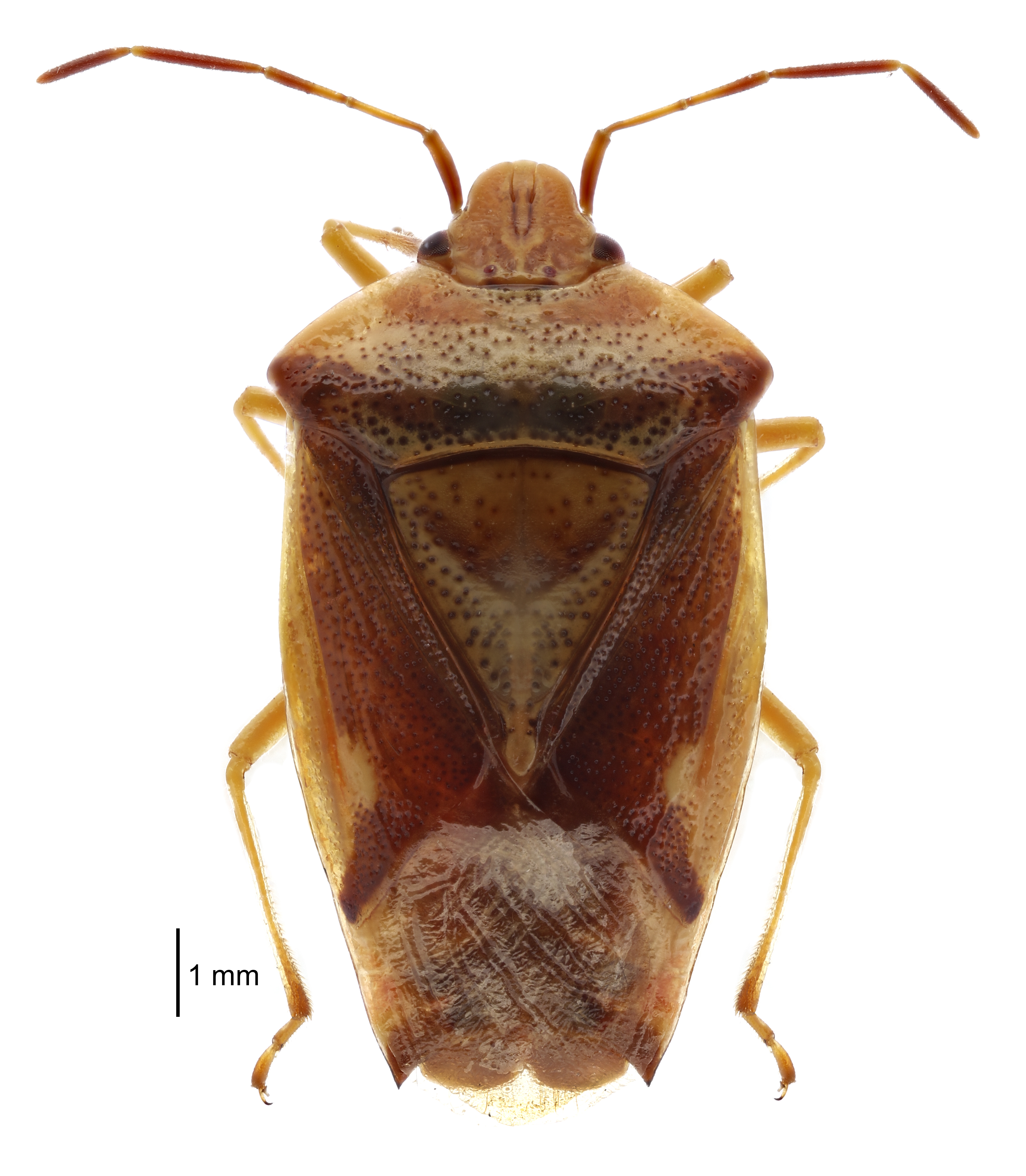
Oncacontias vittatus

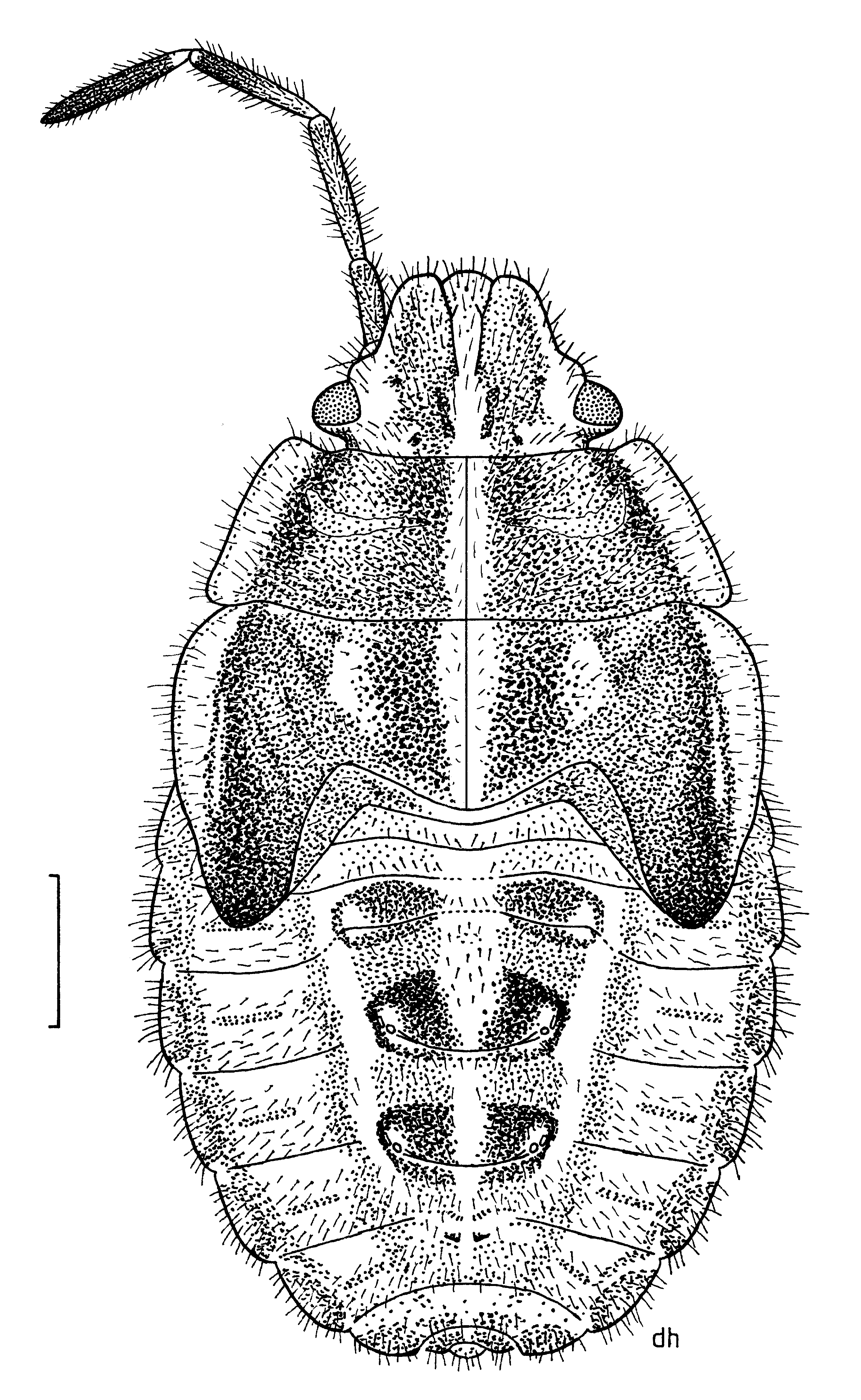
Rhopalimorpha lineolaris juvenile, last instar

Acanthosomatidae is a family of Hemiptera, commonly named shield bugs and sometimes stink bugs. There are currently recognised about 200 species in the genera below, making it one of the least diverse families within Pentatomoidea. The Acanthosomatidae species are found throughout the world, being most abundant in high-latitude temperate regions and in subtropical regions at high altitudes.

One of the most well-known species in Acanthosomatidae is the hawthorn shield bug (Acanthosoma haemorrhoidale), which is found throughout Europe and also northern Siberia; this species is typically green or brown and has a distinctive shape with two projections on its thorax. It feeds on various plants, including hawthorn, rowan, and cherry.

== Description ==
Acanthosomatidae have heads that are keeled laterally and possess a pair of five-segmented antennae. The mesosternum has a strongly projecting keel. The tarsi of the legs are bisegmented. The second visible abdominal sternite has an elongate spine that projects forward. The spiracles of the second abdominal segment are concealed by the metapleura. Abdominal sternite III has paired trichobothria. In males, sternite VIII is exposed, and there is a specialised genital capsule. In females, one or two pairs of Pendergrast's organs are present in the abdomen (sometimes absent, e.g. Elasmucha) and sternite VII has an emarginate posterior margin.

Acanthosomatidae are generally similar to Pentatomidae in appearance. Various sources distinguish them based on the number of tarsal segments, being two in acanthosomatids and three in pentatomids. However, some pentatomids have bisegmented tarsi as well.

== Ecology ==
Acanthosomatidae are mostly herbivores on trees and shrubs. Host plants include Ficus, Hakea, Carex, Juncus, Cladium, and Dactylis. There are also records of predation (including cannibalism) and scavenging on carrion.

== Maternal care ==
Many species have females that take care of their offspring, guarding the eggs and nymphs. In these species, the Pendergrast's organs are absent or reduced and non-functional. Other species have a more limited form of care: females smear their eggs with secretions from the Pendergrast's organs (which may repel predators and parasitoids), then abandon the eggs. Egg smearing is an ancestral behaviour.

== Subfamilies and Genera ==
As of September 2026, BioLib includes three subfamilies and the following genera:

unplaced genus

- Allotriocochabambia Faúndez, Rider & Carvajal, 2014

=== Acanthosomatinae ===
1. Acanthosoma Curtis, 1824
2. Ameenocoris Ahmad & Moizuddin, 1990
3. Amphaces Dallas, 1851
4. Anaxandra (bug) Stål, 1876
5. Catadipson Breddin, 1903
6. Cyphostethus Fieber, 1860
7. Elasmostethus Fieber, 1860
8. Elasmucha Stål, 1864
9. Eupolemus (bug) Distant, 1910
10. Grossaria Kumar, 1974
11. Lindbergicoris Leston, 1953
12. Mahea Distant, 1909
13. Microdeuterus Dallas, 1851
14. Oncacontias Breddin, 1903
15. Platacantha Lindberg, 1934
16. Proctophantasta Breddin, 1903
17. Rhopalimorpha Dallas, 1851
18. Sastragala Amyot & Serville, 1843

Examples of species include:

- Acanthosoma haemorrhoidale (Linnaeus, 1758) — Hawthorn shield bug
- Acanthosoma labiduroides Jakovlev, 1880 — Green shield bug
- Cyphostethus tristriatus — Juniper shield bug
- Elasmostethus interstinctus — Birch shield bug
- Elasmucha grisea (Linnaeus, 1758) — Parent bug
- Elasmucha lateralis (Say, 1831)
- Oncacontias vittatus — Forest shield bug

=== Blaudusinae ===
tribe Blaudusini Kumar, 1974

1. Andriscus (bug) Stål, 1876
2. Bebaeus Dallas, 1851
3. Blaudus Stål, 1872
4. Duadicus Dallas, 1851
5. Hiarchas Distant, 1910
6. Mochus (bug) Distant, 1910
7. Monteithiessa Kumar, 1974
8. Noualhieridia Breddin, 1898
9. Panaetius (bug) Stål, 1865
10. Stauralia Dallas, 1851
11. Xosa Kirkaldy, 1904

tribe Lanopini Kumar, 1974

1. Abulites (bug) Stål, 1876
2. Acrophyma Bergroth, 1917
3. Anischys Dallas, 1851
4. Aposinopla Carpintero & De Biase, 2020
5. Ea (bug) Distant, 1911
6. Galgacus Distant, 1899
7. Hellica Stål, 1867
8. Lanopis Signoret, 1863
9. Phorbanta Stål, 1867
10. Sinopla Signoret, 1864
11. Sniploa Signoret, 1863

=== Ditomotarsinae ===
tribe Ditomotarsini Signoret, 1863

1. Cylindrocnema Mayr, 1864
2. Ditomotarsus Spinola, 1850
3. Esbenia Jensen-Haarup, 1931
4. Hyperbius (bug) Stål, 1867
5. Ibocoris Roche, 1947
6. Mazanoma Rolston & Kumar, 1975
7. Nopalis Signoret, 1863
8. Planois Signoret, 1864
9. Praesus (bug) Stål, 1872
10. Rolstonus Froeschner, 1997
11. Tolono (bug) Rolston & Kumar, 1975
12. Uhlunga Distant, 1892

tribe Laccophorellini Kumar, 1974

1. Aesepus (bug) Stål, 1876
2. Agamedes (bug) Stål, 1876
3. Laccophorella Horváth, 1904
4. Sangarius Stål, 1865

== Gallery ==
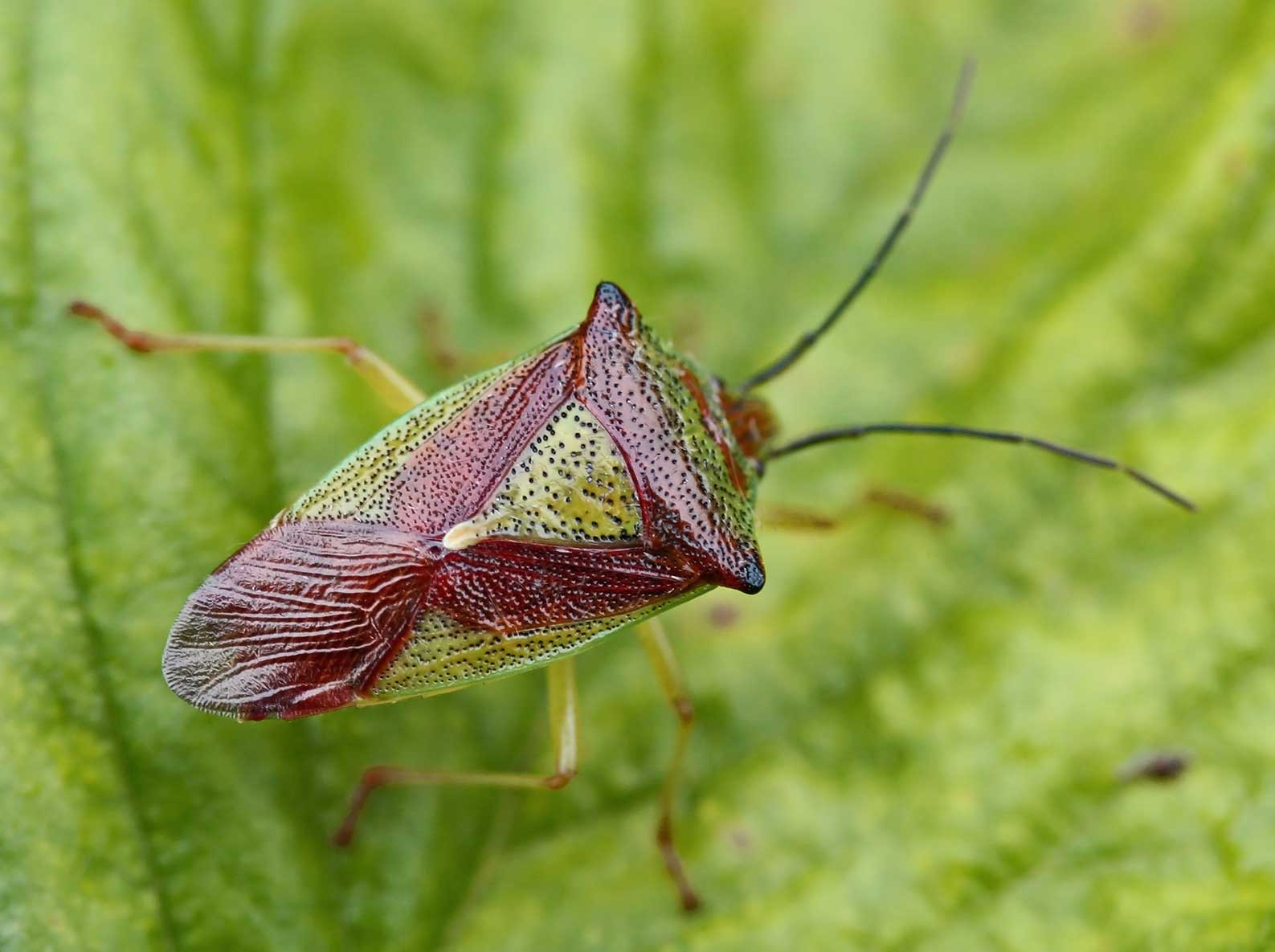
Acanthosoma haemorrhoidale

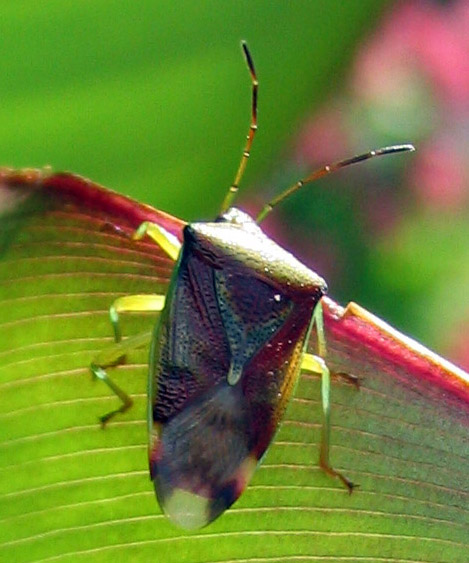
Elasmostethus interstinctus

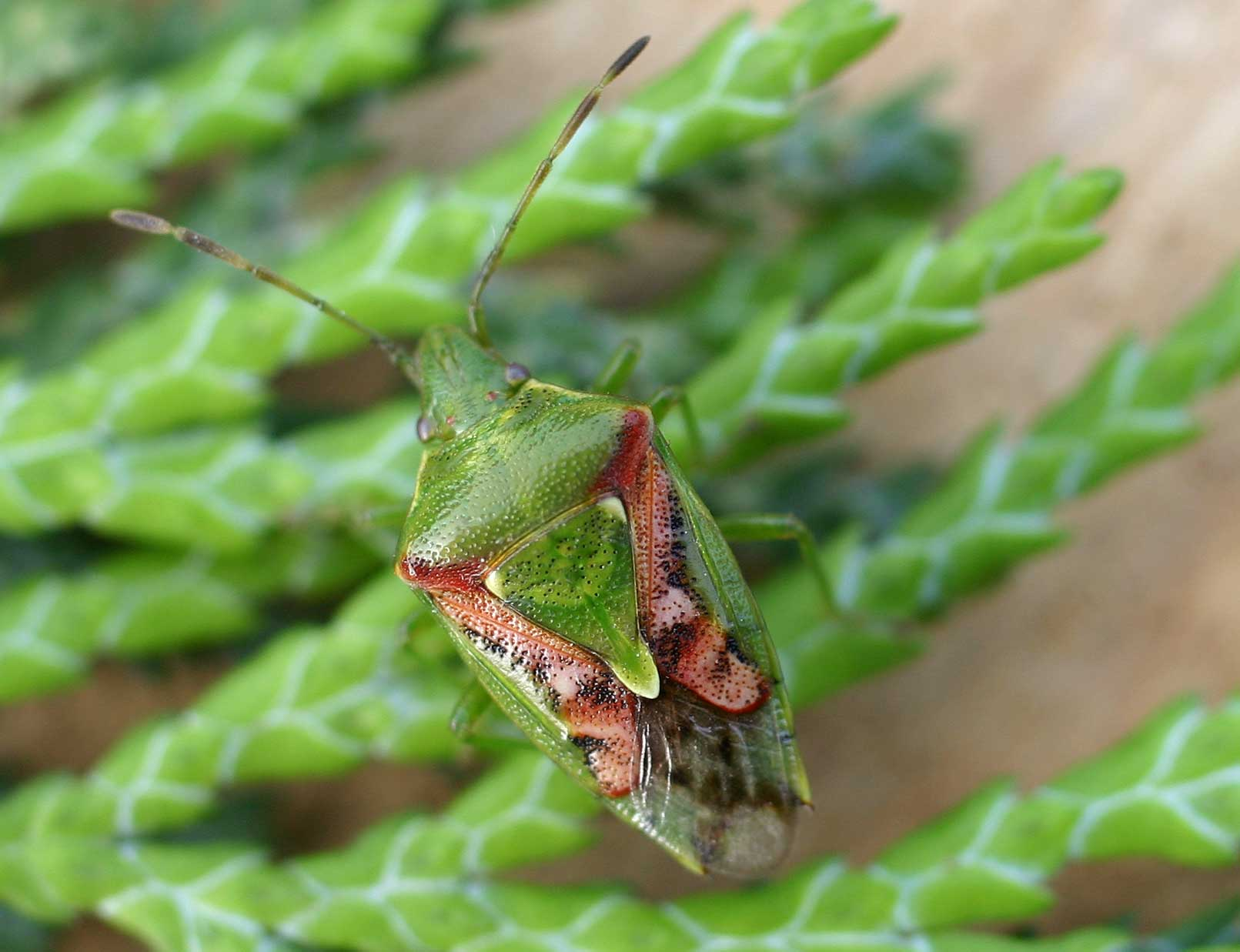
Cyphostethus tristriatus

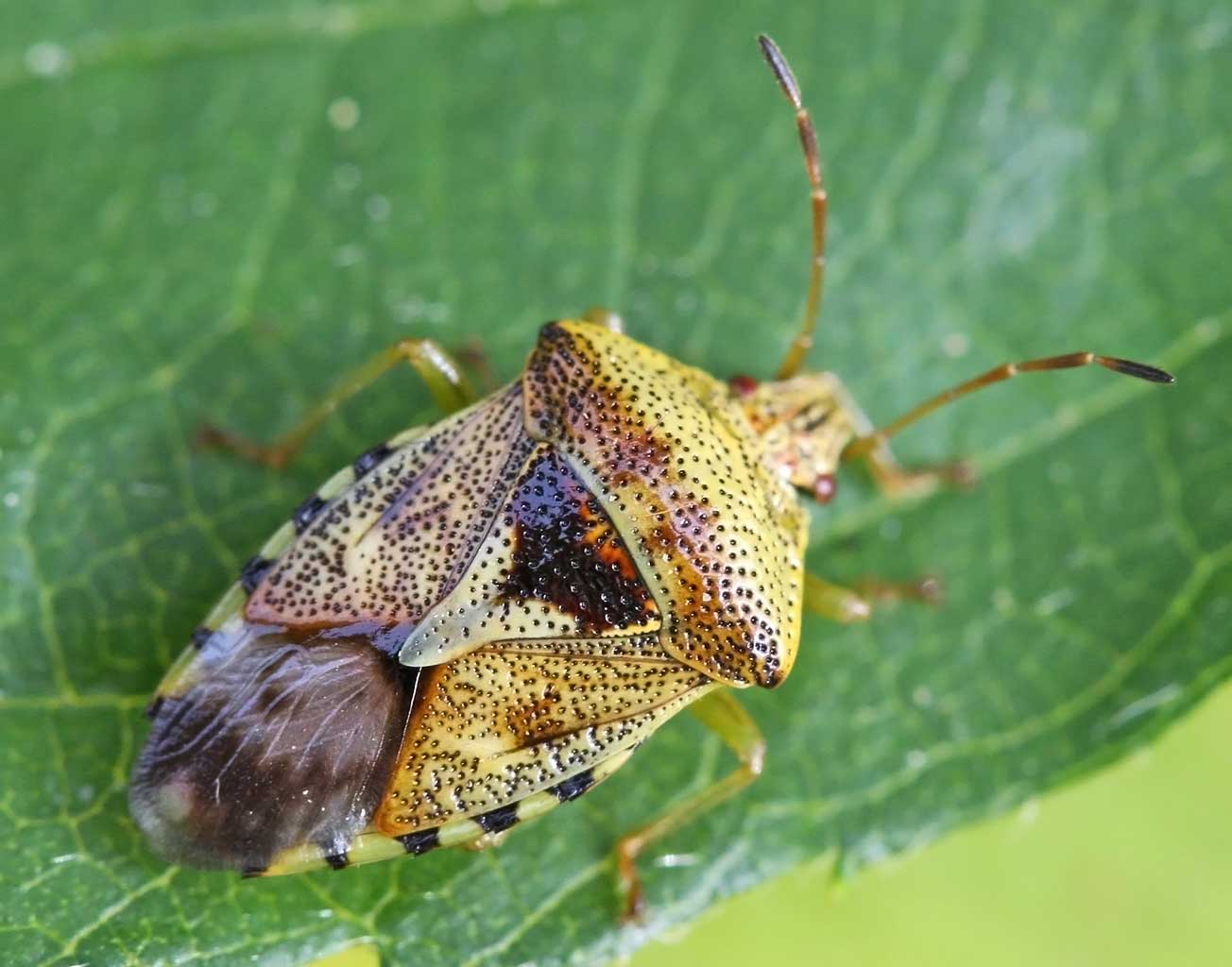
Elasmucha grisea

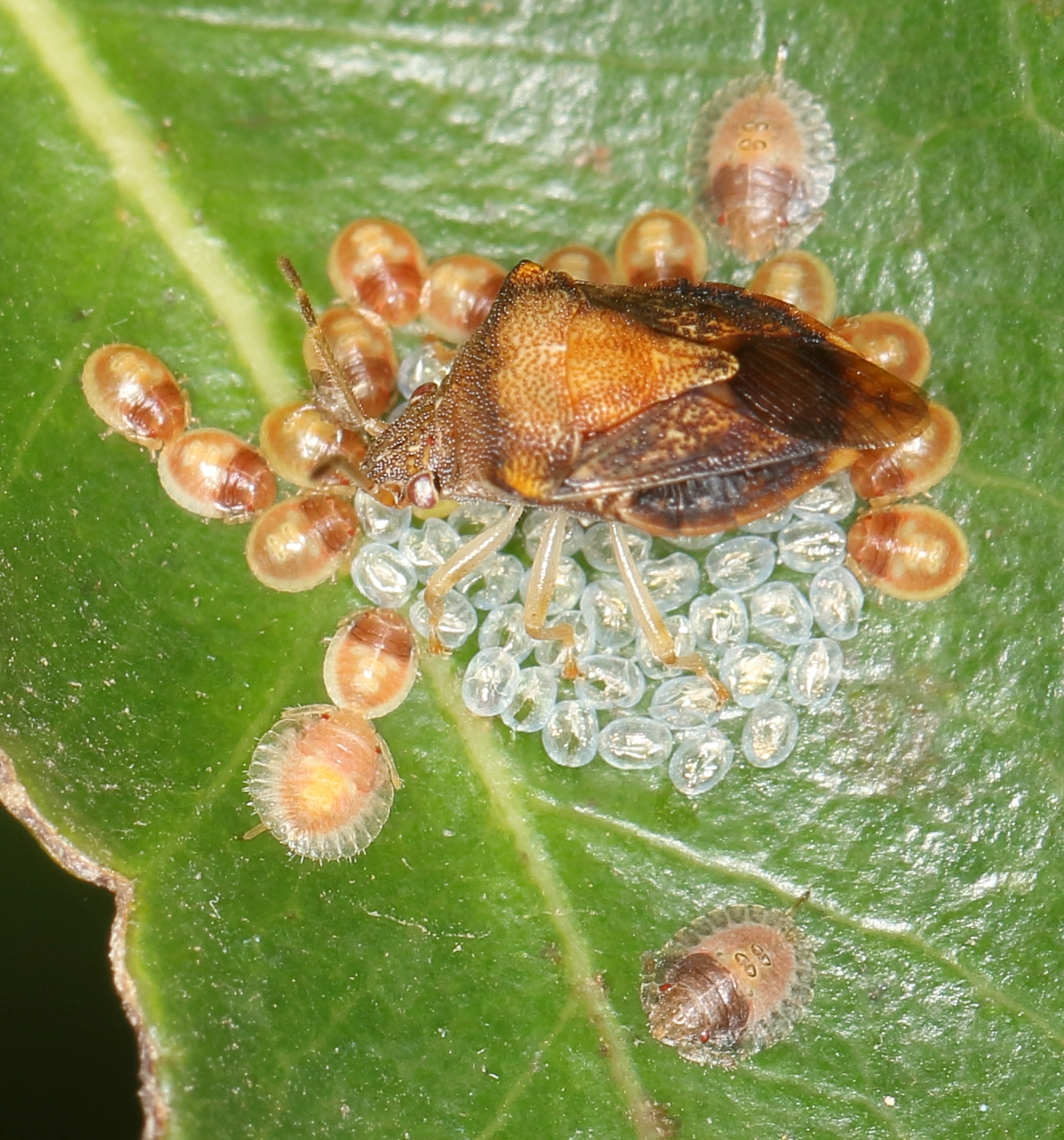
Uhlunga typica
