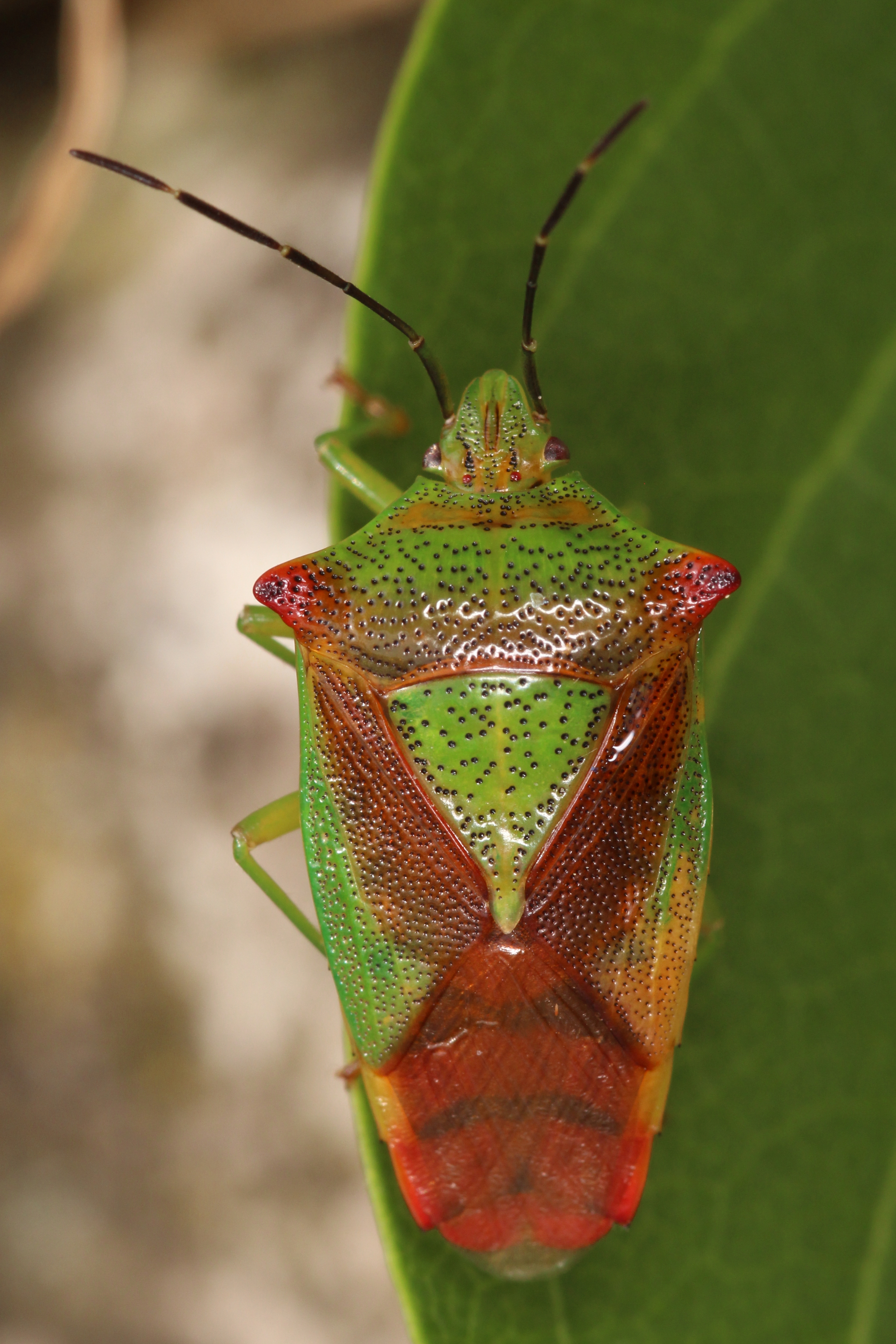
- Acanthosoma haemorrhoidale

Scientific classification
- Kingdom: Animalia
- Phylum: Arthropoda
- Clade: Pancrustacea
- Class: Insecta
- Order: Hemiptera
- Suborder: Heteroptera
- Family: Acanthosomatidae
- Subfamily: Acanthosomatinae
- Genus: Acanthosoma; Curtis 1824

= Acanthosoma =

Genus of true bugs

Acanthosoma is a genus of shield bugs in the family Acanthosomatidae, found in Europe, Asia, and Oceania. There are over 30 described species in the genus Acanthosoma.

== Species ==
The following species are recognised in the genus Acanthosoma:

- Acanthosoma alaticorne Walker, 1868
- Acanthosoma asahinai Ishihara, 1943
- Acanthosoma atayal Tsai & Rédei, 2015
- Acanthosoma axicia Tsai & Rédei, 2015
- Acanthosoma chinanum Kiritshenko, 1931
- Acanthosoma cornutum Dallas, 1849
- Acanthosoma crassicaudum Jakovlev, 1880
- Acanthosoma debile Förster, 1891
- Acanthosoma denticaudum Jakovlev, 1880
- Acanthosoma emeiense Liu, 1980
- Acanthosoma expansum Horváth, 1905
- Acanthosoma fallax Tsai & Rédei, 2015
- Acanthosoma firmatum (Walker, 1868)
- Acanthosoma forcipatum Reuter, 1881
- Acanthosoma forfex Dallas, 1851
- Acanthosoma forficula Jakovlev, 1880
- Acanthosoma haemorrhoidale (Linnaeus, 1758) - Hawthorn Shieldbug
- Acanthosoma hampsoni (Distant, 1900)
- Acanthosoma ishiharai Yamamoto & Hayashi, 2011
- Acanthosoma joursacensis Piton, 1933
- Acanthosoma labiduroides Jakovlev, 1880
- Acanthosoma laevicorne Dallas, 1851
- Acanthosoma livida Heer, 1853
- Acanthosoma maculata Heer, 1853
- Acanthosoma montanum (Liu, 1987)
- Acanthosoma morloti Heer, 1853
- Acanthosoma murreeanum (Distant, 1900)
- Acanthosoma nigricorne Walker, 1868
- Acanthosoma nigrodorsum Hsiao & Liu, 1977
- Acanthosoma pteridis (Hsiao & S.L. Lui, 1977)
- Acanthosoma pugnax Tsai & Rédei, 2015
- Acanthosoma rufescens Dallas, 1851
- Acanthosoma rufispinum (Distant, 1887)
- Acanthosoma shensiense Hsiao & Liu, 1977
- Acanthosoma sichuanense (Liu, 1980)
- Acanthosoma sinense Liu, 1980
- Acanthosoma sp. (Jakovlev, 1880)
- Acanthosoma sp. (Linnaeus, 1758)
- Acanthosoma spinicolle Jakovlev, 1880
- Acanthosoma tauriforme (Distant, 1887)
- Acanthosoma taurina Kirkaldy, 1910
- BOLD:AAJ3749 (Acanthosoma sp.)
