= Bitton (surname) =

Bitton is a surname (spelled ביטון in Hebrew) that is common among North African Sephardim. It comes from 'vita', life.

Notable people with this name include:

- Amit Bitton (born 1996), Israeli footballer
- Ben Bitton (born 1991), Israeli footballer
- Davis Bitton (1930–2007), American history professor and Assistant Church Historian of the Church of Jesus Christ of Latter-day Saints
- Isaac Bitton (born 1947), French-American musician
- Isaac Bitton (boxer) (1779–1839), Dutch Jewish bare-knuckle boxer
- Jean-Luc Bitton (born 1959), French writer and journalist
- Nir Bitton (born 1991), Israeli footballer
- Naor Bitton, Israeli political activist and community leader
- Raquel Bitton (fl. 1980–present), French singer, actress and playwright
- Shimon Bitton (born 1967), Israeli former footballer
- Simone Bitton (born 1955), French-Moroccan documentary filmmaker
- Thomas Bitton (died 1307), Bishop of Exeter
- Yifat Bitton (born 1971?), Israeli law professor and activist
- Yosef Bittón, Argentinian-born rabbi and former Chief Rabbi of Uruguay

== See also ==
- William of Bitton (died 1264), Roman Catholic Bishop of Bath and Wells
- William of Bitton (nephew) (died 1274), Roman Catholic Bishop of Bath and Wells
- Livia Bitton-Jackson (1931–2023), Czech author and Holocaust survivor
- Thomas Bytton, Anglican Dean of Wells between 1284 and 1292
- Biton, a Jewish surname
- Byton (disambiguation)
