= Biton (disambiguation) =

Biton is a Hebrew surname common among Israeli Moroccan-Jews, originated from Spain.

Biton may also refer to:

- AS Biton, Malian football club
- Biton, Burkina Faso
- Biton of Pergamon, an ancient Greek writer of the Hellenistic period on war and siege machines
- Kleobis and Biton, the two Argive brothers given as examples of a happy life in History of Herodotus
- Biton (arachnid), a genus of spider in family Daesiidae
