= Eberlanzia =

Eberlanzia may refer to:

- Eberlanzia (arachnid), a genus of arachnids in the family Daesiidae
- Eberlanzia (plant), a genus of plants in the family Aizoaceae
