= Esther Levine =

German photographer (born 1970)

- Born: 1970 (age 55–56); Frankfurt, Hesse, Germany
- Education: City College of New York
- Occupation: Photographer
- Website: www.estherlevine.com/EstherLevine.html

Esther Levine (born 1970 in Frankfurt am Main) is a German born, New York based photographer. After studying photography at the City College of New York from 1994 to 1996 she enrolled in the documentary photography program at the International Center of Photography in New York City in 1996. Levine, a Leica photographer, has had exhibits in New York, Berlin, Buenos Aires, Switzerland, Guangzhou and Mannheim, shot ad campaigns and had her work published in a variety of European magazines.

Her urban photo project has covered New York City (1997–), Berlin (1999–), Warschau (2003–) and Guangzhou (2005–).

== Bibliography ==
- Berlin - the Urban Photo Project Edition J. H. Heckenhauer, 2006, ISBN 3-9809619-4-X.

== Exhibitions ==
- “New York” @ Leica Galerie, Frankfurt, 2006
- Urban Photo Project, “Berlin” and “New York”@ Galerie Gordon & Pym, Paris, 2005
- Urban Photo Project, “New York” @ Galerie J. J. Heckenhauer, Berlin, 2005
- "Witness to a Century" @ Leica Gallery, New York, USA 2005
- Urban Photo Project, “New York” @ Fototage Mannheim Ludwigshafen, 2005
- "German Photography" @ Leica Gallery, New York, USA, 2005
- "Global Cities" @ Canton, China, curated by Alain Julien, 2005
- Urban Photo Project, “Berlin” @ Galerie J. J. Heckenhauer, Berlin, 2004
- Festival de la Luz @ Buenos Aires, 2004
- “Auf nach Europa”, in cooperation with Leica Deutschland, the FAZ und the French cultural institute in Frankfurt 2004
- “Berlin” @ Half King, New York, USA 2004
- "Berlin" @ Go Fish Gallery, New York, USA 2003
- "New York Portrait" @ Paprika, New York, USA 2002
- "Address" - Group Exhibit @ Paris, 2002
- "Paris/Berlin" with Dolorès Marat, Toit du Monde @ Vevey, 2001
- Slideshow @ Voies Off - Rencontres Internationales de la Photographie @ Arles, 2001
- Feature in Photo District News's 30 under 30 issue. 2001
- Leica Gallery @ Photo Expo, New York, USA 2000
- Slideshow @ Voies Off - Rencontres Internationales de la Photographie, Arles, 2000
- Yearly Final Exhibit @ International Center of Photography, New York, USA 1997

== See also ==
- List of photographers
