= Gothic Church, Šamorín =

Church in Šamorín, Slovakia

Coordinates: 48°01′35.2″N 17°18′40.6″E

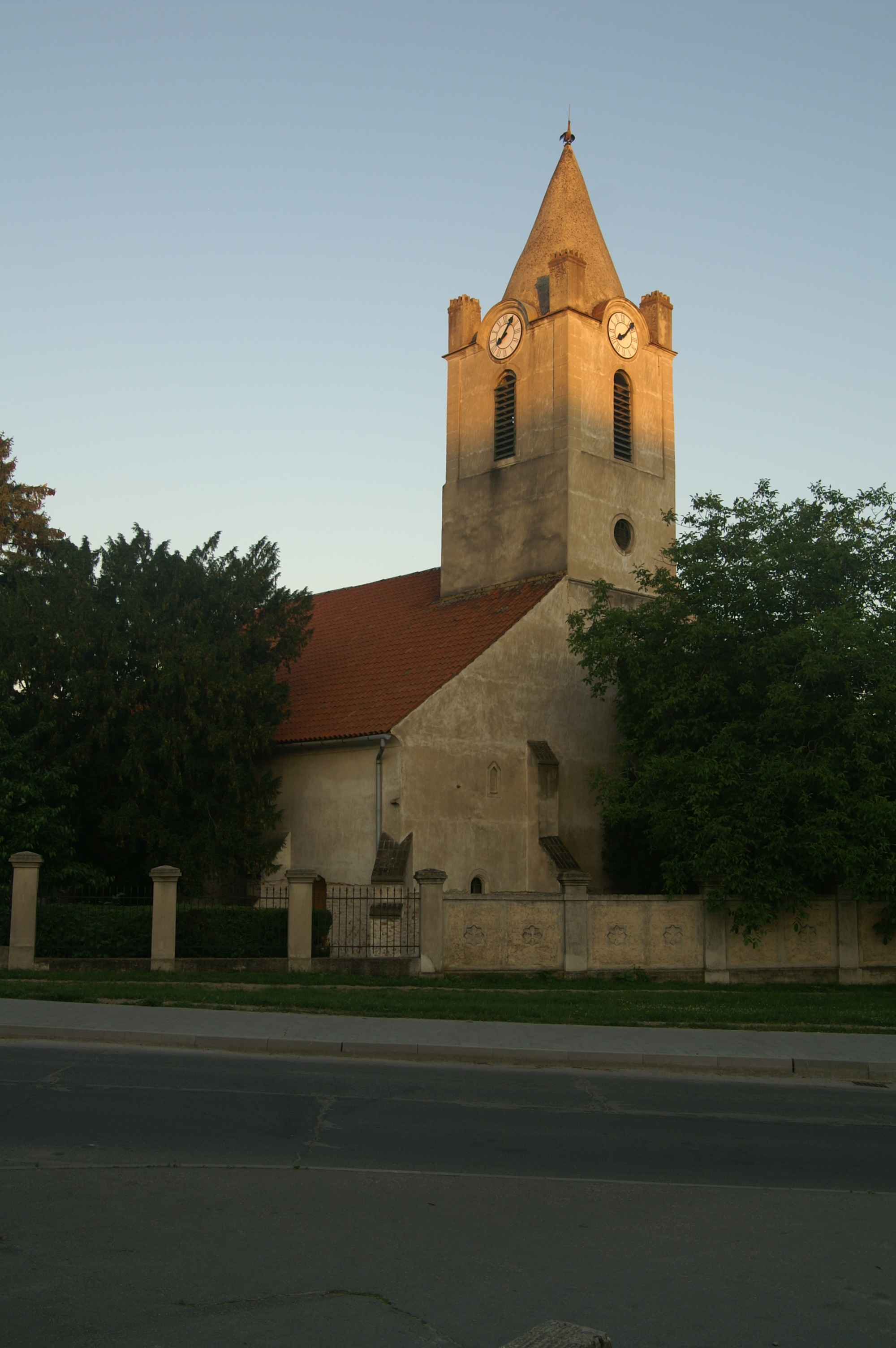
Gothic church, Šamorín, view from Hlavná street

The Gothic church of Šamorín (Slovak: Stredoveký farský kostol Šamorína) is a church of the Reformed Christian Church in Šamorín in Dunajská Streda District in Slovakia. It is one of the oldest churches on Žitný ostrov.

== Structure, shape and characteristic ==
The church is composed of three naves. It is 33.72 by 23.52 metres (110.6 ft × 77.2 ft).

== History ==
The church was built in the Middle Ages when Šamorín was a village. It was built on the banks of the Danube but the river's course changed.

The eastern part of the church, an early Gothic holy cave, was constructed in the first half of the thirteenth century. Its outer walls bear traces of the late reconstruction. This, and the supporting pillars, may have been the work of Bratislava's mayor Alexander's son Karol shortly after 1287. The holy cave was lit by five arched windows. Among these, only three east side windows are original, made in the first half of the 13th century. The two remaining windows on the south side were refurbished in the Gothic style in the 15th century, then in the Baroque style in the 18th century and, finally, enlarged in 1931.

After reconstruction around 1290, the whole church was decorated with painted figures, which were later covered but were revealed again during restoration. There are also paintings of standing Saints, a depiction of Holy Mary's death and Judging Jesus.

The north side wing was built/rebuilt later, probably after some kind of a disaster, fire or possibly flood.

The organ case dates from the second half of the 19th century. The wooden gate on the outside of the north hall was made in 1844; the altar was made of red marble in 1904.

== Modern era ==
Modern buildings now surround the church, at the east end of the Bratislava's main streets.

== See also ==
- Šamorin Roman Catholic Church
