= Syndaesia =

Syndaesia mastix

Scientific classification
- Kingdom: Animalia
- Phylum: Arthropoda
- Subphylum: Chelicerata
- Class: Arachnida
- Order: Solifugae
- Family: Daesiidae
- Genus: Syndaesia; Maury, 1980
- Species: S. mastix

Binomial name
- Syndaesia mastix Maury, 1980

Species of spider-like animal

Syndaesia mastix is a species of arachnids in the order Solifugae, and the only member of the genus Syndaesia. It lives in western Argentina, and is one of only two daesiids in South America, the other being Ammotrechelis goetschi from the Atacama Desert; all other South American solifugids are in the families Eremobatidae and Ammotrechidae.
