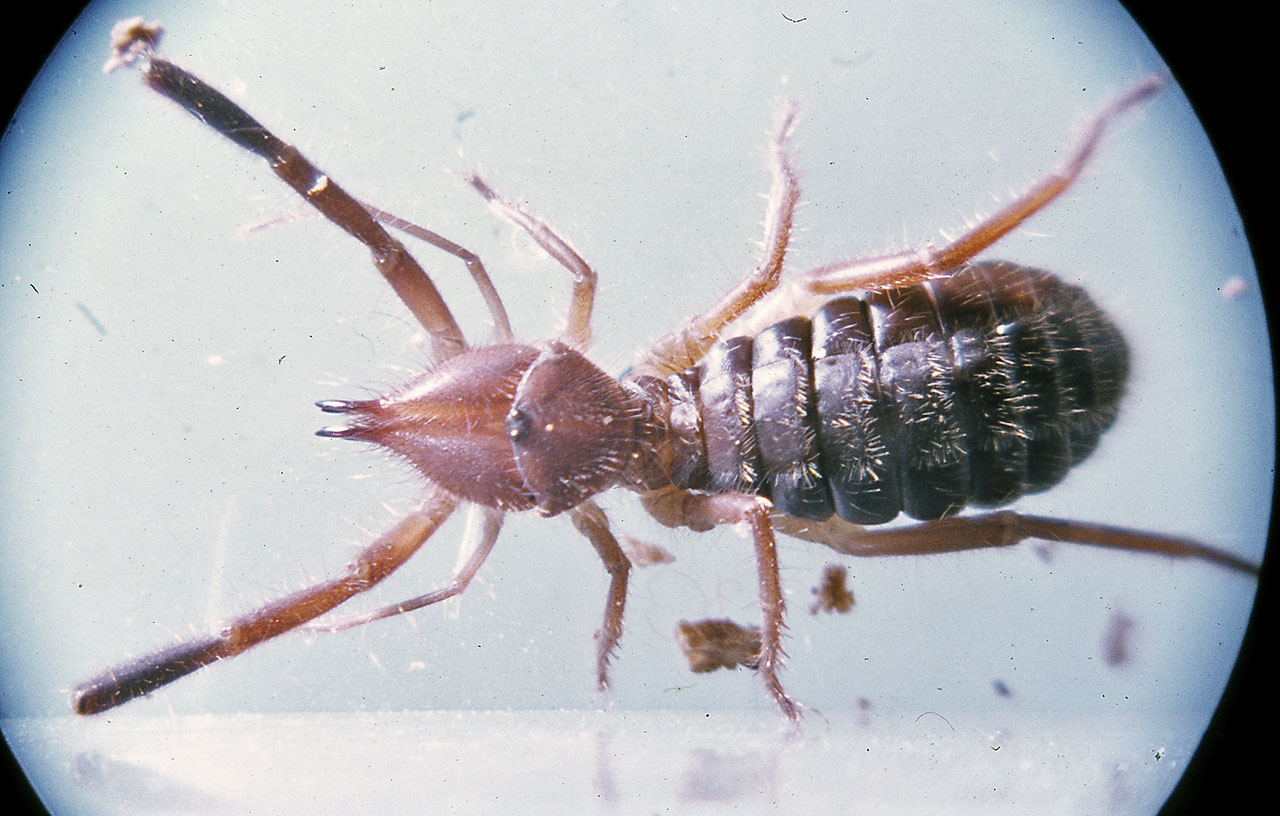
- Gluvia dorsalis

Scientific classification
- Domain: Eukaryota
- Kingdom: Animalia
- Phylum: Arthropoda
- Subphylum: Chelicerata
- Class: Arachnida
- Order: Solifugae
- Family: Daesiidae
- Genus: Gluvia; C.L. Koch, 1842

Type species
- Gluvia dorsalis (Latreille, 1817)

Species
- Gluvia brunnea Pertegal et al., 2024; Gluvia dorsalis (Latreille, 1817)

= Gluvia =

Genus of camel spiders

Gluvia is a genus of daesiid camel spiders, first described by Carl Ludwig Koch in 1842. The genus is endemic to the Iberian peninsula.

== Species ==
- Gluvia brunnea Pertegal, Barranco, De Mas, Moya-Laraño, 2024
- Gluvia dorsalis (Latreille, 1817)
