= Marie Darrieussecq =

French writer (born 1969)

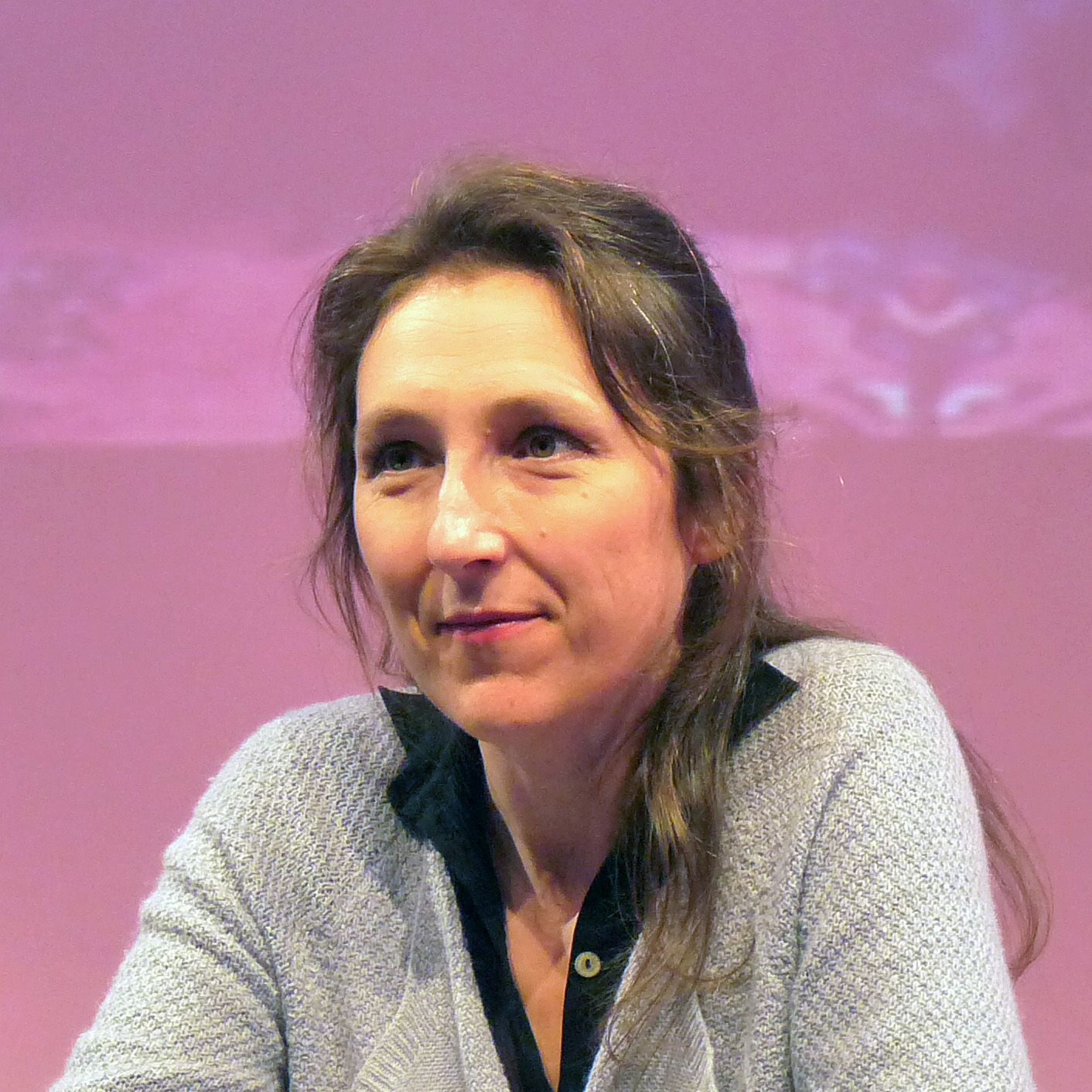
Marie Darrieussecq in 2011

Marie Darrieussecq (French pronunciation: [maʁi daʁjøsɛk]; born 3 January 1969, Bayonne) is a French writer. She is also a translator, and has practised as a psychoanalyst.

Her books explore the unspoken and abandoned territories in literature. Her work is dense, marked by a constant renewal of genres and registers. She is published by the French publisher P.O.L.

Her first book, Truismes (Pig Tales), published at the age of 27, about the metamorphosis of a woman into a sow, was a worldwide success, with a circulation of more than one million copies in France and abroad, translated into forty languages.

In 2013, she was awarded the Prix Médicis and the Prix des Prix for her novel Il faut beaucoup aimer les hommes (Men, A Novel of Cinema & Desire). In 2019, she held the biannual Writer-in-Residence's Chair at Sciences Po in Paris.

== Biography ==
=== Education ===
In 1986, she passed the Baccalauréat in French Literature in Bayonne. After a two-year preparatory course (Hypokhâgne and Khâgne) in literature at the Lycée Montaigne in Bordeaux and the Lycée Louis-Le-Grand in Paris, she studied at the École Normale Supérieure de la Rue d'Ulm in Paris from 1990 to 1994, followed by the Sorbonne Nouvelle. In 1992, she passed her aggregation in Modern Literature, coming sixth.

Her doctoral thesis under the direction of Francis Marmande, defended in 1997 at the Université Paris VII, was entitled: "Critical Moments in Contemporary Literature. Tragic Irony and Autofiction in the Works of Georges Perec, Michel Leiris, Serge Doubrovsky and Hervé Guibert."

=== Personal life ===
Her first husband was a mathematician and her second is an astrophysicist. Darrieussecq has three children.

== Novels ==
Darrieussecq locates her work in the realm of fiction and qualifies The Baby as her "only autobiographical book." Almost all her characters are women, and most of them are narrators. They write, mostly in notebooks, in order to bear witness to events and to survive. Although they seem to resemble the author by their profession (several are psychologists), they are never completely like her. For example, not one of them is an author.

She either writes short monologues or novels in the third person that focus on the world as a whole, through a group of people from a fictive village called Clèves in south-west France, in the Basque country:

“I called this fictive, autobiographical village Clèves as a tribute to the Princesse de Clèves. I had had enough of inventing characters. Now I draw them from the reservoir of Clèves, and watch them grow older, from the 80s till much later. Solange, Rose, Christian, etc. (…) There is often an important theme, imposed by what’s happening in the world. I recently wanted to write about the migrants, like everybody else… But in my own way, far from clichés and pre-digested sentences.”

Pig Tales and My Phantom Husband can be read as two early novels that announce the total body of her work: she writes about the body and its metamorphosis, overflow and loss, with an unprecedented approach to feminine issues, while resorting to the fantastic, ghosts and monsters. Monsters play an important role in Darrieussecq's poetics: she conceives writing as being "available to phantoms," a way of making absence present, making the reader hear the inaudible, and considering, in metaphysical cycles, the encounter between the origin of life and the silence of death.

This leads to a dense body of work that unfolds in time and leaves room for experimentation. Darrieussecq has published eighteen novels, a play, a biography, two children's books and several artists’ catalogues.

She works on clichés and structures her novels around commonplaces. The journalist Raphaëlle Leyris wrote in 2011:

“Marie Darrieussecq’s subject has always been same since Pig Tales: examining what language has to say about experience, the way words, namely commonplaces, express reality and, in return, shape reality.”

The title Il faut beaucoup aimer les hommes (Men. A Novel of Cinema and Desire) was taken from a sentence by Marguerite Duras in La Vie matérielle: "We have to love men a lot. A lot, a lot. Love them a lot to love them. Otherwise it’s impossible, we couldn’t bear them."

== Themes ==
As a writer of the metamorphic body, she is interested in mutation, the feminine, the masculine and the non-binary.

The body's relationship to excess and deficiency, outrageousness and disappearance, is a major theme in her work. She says she writes: "for the body and towards the body, within the meaning of what doesn’t speak inside us." Ghosts wander through all her books, the disappearance of a man, a child or a world. Darrieussecq explores zones of silence and the unsaid: "Putting words on what has no words, where words do not yet exist, or do not exist anymore."

Her characters are generally well-travelled and move between Antarctica (White), Australia (Tom Is Dead), Los Angeles and The Congo (Men) and the Mediterranean on a cruise ship (La Mer à l’envers). She associates psychology and history in her novels with different forms of geography. Nathalie Crom, in an article on her novel Le Pays in La Croix, wrote that she raises "the question of belonging (to a language, a landscape, or a nation), without the slightest nostalgia for a classical or traditional vision of taking root."

She pays special attention to geography in its relationship with space as well as time, and the Anthropocene Era, conscious that the planet has a limited lifespan. Wild animals and endangered species abound. Darrieussecq makes Gilles Deleuze's assertion her own: "Writers are responsible for dying animals." She writes for and in the place of disappearing animals. In an interview with the journalist Mia Funk, she declared: "When the last elephant has disappeared, we will miss him. We miss the Tasmanian tiger."

In 2013, she wrote in a chronicle in the newspaper Libération: "We don’t know what will remain of us, once we live on a planet without wild animals. When what is missed is missed to the extent that its name is no longer known, even the hollow form can no longer be felt, and we lose a part of ourselves, we become more stupid, compact and less labile. Less animal, one could say."

== A feminine point of view in literature ==
In Pig Tales, she relates the metaphor of a "monstrous form of puberty" through the metamorphosis of a woman into a sow. Darrieussecq introduces babies into literature with The Baby, a book she qualifies as a "militant literary gesture." In Clèves, she describes the transformation of a teenage girl with the arrival of her first period and her discovery of sexuality. Virginie Despentes wrote in Le Monde des Livres:

“Clèves functions like a rewinding up of moments that have not been forgotten or occulted, just never consulted or celebrated.”

In 2016, she published Être ici est une splendeur, Vie de Paula M. Becker (Being Here Is Everything: Life of Paula M. Becker), the biography of the German painter Paula Modersohn-Becker, whose surname she amputated in the subtitle "Life of Paula M. Becker": "Women don’t have a name. They have first names. Their name is a transitory loan, an unstable, ephemeral sign. They find other landmarks for their claim to the world, presence, creation and signature. They invent themselves in a man’s world, by infraction."

After Virginia Woolf, Nathalie Sarraute and Marguerite Duras, Darrieussecq "accounts for the entire world," considering the fact that half of the world, women, does still not really have the right to speak.

However, she refuses to associate her books with feminist literature:

“I have no problem in calling myself a feminist. But I don’t use the word to qualify my books. (…) It would be simplistic. My books are also ecological, for example.”

== Style ==
Darrieussecq's writing is characterized by its precision, concision and clarity; nervous, rhythmic, using internal prosody, often in octosyllables or in blank verse. Her minimalist style, full of anecdotes and scientific or geographical metaphors, serves a "physical form of writing", close to "writing as sensation", an expression she keyed for Nathalie Sarraute.

=== Relationship with language ===
Darrieussecq, whose mother and two grandmothers spoke Basque, regularly claims in interviews that she doesn't sacralise French, and considers it as a language among others: "I believe writers have a special relationship with their mother tongue. They dare to touch it, consider it as something outside of themselves, and they can either break or play with this body of language." Her characters often move from one continent to another and are almost all confronted with foreign languages. In Tom Is Dead, the child's death was announced in English, since the French narrator was living in Australia:

“After Tom’s death, my English, the way I actually understood English, had shrunk in a way. (…) But during the group therapy, I knew what people were talking about. So I could follow. It was with them that I learned how to speak again. My language lessons.” (Tom Is Dead)

=== French as a masculine language ===
In Le Pays, Darrieussecq qualifies French as a "language of authority" in which "the masculine subject rules the sentence, supported by the verb." She demonstrates as follows:

“The masculine dominates the feminine in the French language; if all the women in the world were accompanied by a dog, they would be constrained, these women and dogs, to be addressed in the masculine form, since women and dogs are obedient.”

Asked whether her writing is feminine, she replies:

"Writing has no gender or sex, because the novel is a place of metamorphosis."

Nevertheless, she adds in the preface to her translation of Virginia Woolf:

"I leave open the question of feminine writing, which is also the question of my life."

== Polemics and critical acclaim ==
=== Polemics ===
In 1998, the writer Marie NDiaye accused Darrieussecq to have "aped" several of her books in order to write My Phantom Husband.

In 2007, upon the publishing of Tom is Dead, Camille Laurens, who was also published by P.O.L, accused Darrieussecq of "psychic plagiarism". Their publisher Paul Otchakovsky-Laurens defended Darrieussecq in a tribune in Le Monde entitled "No, Marie Darrieussecq did not pirate Camille Laurens." After these accusations, Darrieussecq published an essay in 2010, Rapport de police, on the question of plagiarism in literature. A Wikipedia page has been written on the conflict that followed the publication of Tom is Dead.

=== Critical acclaim ===
In 1988, Marie Darrieussecq was awarded the Prix du jeune écrivain de langue française (the Young French Writer's Prize) for her short story La Randonneuse.

In 1996, the publication of Pig Tales propelled Darrieussecq, at 27 years old, onto the media scene and triggered a shock wave. That same year, Jean-Luc Godard bought the rights of the novel and then decided not to adapt it.

In Le Figaro, Eric Ollivier wrote about Pig Tales in an article entitled "A tale that makes you puke: You feel an internal rage, a falsely naïve and merry tone that impulsively relates horrors out of this world (…). Nonsense prevails, up till the epilogue. Disgusting and difficult to bear."

In 2003, J.M.G. Le Clézio wrote in Le Point:

"Marie Darrieussecq’s work reminds one of Lautréamont: the dream of the swine, in Canto IV, begins as follows: "I dreamed that I had entered the body of a swine… when I wanted to kill, I killed." Pig Tales was born. The passage when Falmer, or the ghost of Maldoror, flies over the Panthéon is My Phantom Husband. White is a hymn to the ocean, to amphibious man, or even the "girl of snow" who appears in Canto VI."

Upon the publication of Being Here is a Splendour, Life of Paula M. Becker, Etienne de Montety wrote in Le Figaro littéraire in 2016: "(...) nothing of what is feminine is unfamiliar to Marie Darrieussecq. It is her trademark."

== Commitments ==
Darrieussecq has been Patron of the Réseau DES France since 2001, an association that helps victims of Distelbène.

In 2007, she was elected Patron of Bibliothèques sans frontières.

During the French presidential campaign in 2007, she supported Ségolène Royale.

In 2012, she was "Marraine de l’association d’étudiants du Pays basque aux grandes écoles".

In 2014, she participated in Passés par la case prison (Served a prison sentence) and became Patron of the Observatoire des prisons.

In 2019, she was appointed president de l’Avance sur recettes (advance on earnings) for the CNC (Centre National du Cinéma et de l’image animée).

== Bibliography ==
=== Novels and narratives ===
==== English version ====
  - Pig Tales. A Novel of Lust and Transformation, [1996] The New Press, 1997.
  - My Phantom Husband, [1998] Faber & Faber, 2001.
  - Breathing Underwater, [1999] Faber & Faber, 2002.
  - A Brief Stay With the Living, [2001] Faber & Faber, 2004.
  - White, [2003] Faber & Faber, 2006.
  - Tom Is Dead, [2007] The Text Publishing Company, 2013.
  - All the Way, [2011] The Text Publishing Company, 2013.
  - Men, [2013] The Text Publishing Company, 2016.
  - Our Life in the Forest, [2017] The Text Publishing Company, 2018.
  - The Baby, [2002] The Text Publishing Company, 2019.

==== Original version ====
  - 1996 : Truismes, P.O.L (ISBN 2867445299)
  - 1998 : Naissance des fantômes, P.O.L,, (ISBN 2867446139)
  - 1999 : Le Mal de mer, P.O.L (ISBN 2070416232)
  - 1999 : Précisions sur les vagues, P.O.L (ISBN 9782846822633)
  - 2001 : Bref séjour chez les vivants, P.O.L, (ISBN 2867448441)
  - 2002 : Le Bébé, P.O.L (ISBN 2867448743)
  - 2003 : White, P.O.L (ISBN 2867449626)
  - 2003 : Simulatrix, éd. Les Inrockuptibles, coll. « des nouvelles du sexe » (ASIN B004RH9Z7Q)
  - 2004 : Claire dans la forêt suivi de Penthésilée, premier combat, éd. des femmes (ISBN 9782721004918)
  - 2005 : Le Pays, P.O.L (ISBN 9782846820851)
  - 2006 : Zoo, P.O.L (ISBN 2846821348)
  - 2007 : Tom est mort, P.O.L (ISBN 9782846822091)
  - 2007 : Mrs Ombrella et les musées du désert, éd. Scali (ISBN 9782350121253)
  - 2011 : Clèves, P.O.L (ISBN 978-2-8180-1397-7)
  - 2013 : Il faut beaucoup aimer les hommes, P.O.L (ISBN 978-2-8180-1924-5) — prix Médicis
  - 2017 : Notre vie dans les forêts, P.O.L (ISBN 978-2-8180-4366-0)
  - 2019 : La Mer à l'envers, P.O.L (ISBN 978-2-8180-4806-1)

=== Essay ===
- 2010 : Rapport de police. Accusations de plagiat et autres modes de surveillance de la fiction, P.O.L (ISBN 9782846823319)

=== Biography ===
- 2016 : Être ici est une splendeur. Vie de Paula M.Becker, P.O.L (ISBN 978-2-8180-3906-9) — prix du Livre d'art Lire

=== Translations ===
- 2008 : Tristes Pontiques d'Ovide, P.O.L (ISBN 9782846822824)
- 2012 : Tigre, tigre ! de Margaux Fragoso, Flammarion (ISBN 9782081245600)
- 2014 : Brouillons d'un baiser de James Joyce, éditions Gallimard (ISBN 978-2070143740)
- 2016 : Un lieu à soi de Virginia Woolf, éditions Denoël. (ISBN 9782207123676)
- 2019 : Chroniques d’un enfant du pays de James Baldwin, Gallimard (ISBN 978-2072796838)

=== Theatre ===
- 2009 : Le Musée de la mer, P.O.L (ISBN 2846823308)

=== Children’s literature ===
- 2008 : Péronille la chevalière, Albin Michel Jeunesse (ISBN 9782226189400)
- 2016 : Le Chien Croquette, avec Nelly Blumenthal, Albin Michel Jeunesse (ISBN 9782226392350)

=== Art books ===
  - 1998 : Dans la maison de Louise, CAPC musée d'art contemporain de Bordeaux (ASIN B000WY098C)
  - 2000 : Il était une fois... la plage, photographies de Roger-Viollet, éd. Plume (ISBN 284110124X)
  - 2001 : Sculptures de Lydie Arickx, textes et photographies, éd. Artémoins (ISBN 2913978061)
  - 2003 : Illusion de Dolorès Marat, éditions Filigranes (ISBN 9782914381499)
  - 2006 : Do You Know What I Mean de Juergen Teller, Actes Sud (ISBN 9782742760534)
  - 2008 : B2B2SP d'Édouard François, éd. Archibooks (ISBN 9782357330351)
  - 2011 : A Portrait of the Artist as a Young Mother, éditions Filigranes (ISBN 9782350462172)
  - 2012 : La mer console de toutes les laideurs, photographies de Gabrielle Duplantier, éditions Cairn (ISBN 9782350682501)
  - 2013 : Gisants de Jan Fabre, éd. Galerie Daniel Templon (ISBN 9782917515112)
  - 2013 : Faire de son mieux, photographies de Gilbert Garcin, éditions Filigranes (ISBN 9782350462899)
  - 2013 : A triple tour, collectif, éditions du Centre des monuments nationaux (ISBN 978-2757702956)
  - 2015 : Bretonnes, de Charles Fréger, collectif, Actes Sud (ISBN 978-2330050443)
  - 2016 : Nigel Cooke, collectif, Phaidon Press (ISBN 978-0714870915)
  - 2016 : Julia Garimorth, Marie Darrieussecq, Maria Stavrinaki, Rainer Stamm, Uwe M. Schneede, Wolfgang Werner, Paula Modersohn-Becker, l'intensité d'un regard, catalogue de l'exposition du musée d'art moderne de la ville de Paris, 256 p. (ISBN 978-2-7596-0322-0)
  - 2016 : Lancel : Maison parisienne depuis 1876, collectif, Flammarion (ISBN 9782081393127)

=== Discussions ===
- 2008 : Marie Darrieussecq parle des éditions P.O.L, Presses universitaires de Paris Ouest (ISBN 9782840160014)
- 2014 : Écrire, écrire, pourquoi ?, éditions de la Bibliothèque publique d'information (ISBN 9782842461881)

=== Prefaces ===
  - 2005 : préface à Bernard Faucon, livre de photographies, Actes Sud (ISBN 2742756671)
  - 2009 : préface à Le Pressentiment d'Emmanuel Bove, Seuil, coll. « Points signatures » (ISBN 978-2757812266)
  - 2010 : préface à Distilbène : des mots sur un scandale de Véronique Mahé, Albin Michel (ISBN 9782226217400)
  - 2010 : préface à La Fin du monde : reloaded de Philippe Djian et Horst Haack, éd. Alternatives (ISBN 9782862276373)
  - 2014 : préface à La Route qui mène à la ville de Natalia Ginzburg, éditions Denoël (ISBN 978-2207118009)

=== Collective works ===
  - 1997 : Dix, Grasset / Les Inrockuptibles (ISBN 2246547016)
  - 2002 : Les Contes de Perrault revus par..., La Martinère (ISBN 9782846750387)
  - 2005 : La Cuisine basque gourmande, éd. du Quai rouge (ISBN 2915076073)
  - 2005 : Naissances, éd. L'Iconoclaste (ISBN 9782913366107)
  - 2006 : Va y avoir du sport !, Gallimard Jeunesse, coll. « Scripto » (ISBN 9782070576494)
  - 2007 : Parisiennes, Flammarion (ISBN 9782081206717)
  - 2009 : Guerre et paix des sexes, Hachette (ISBN 9782011457271)
  - 2010 : Recherche bonheur désespérément..., Presses universitaires de France (ISBN 9782130582021)
  - 2013 : La Malle, Gallimard (ISBN 9782070140329)
  - 2013 : L'Impossible enfant. Don d'ovocytes, l'envers du décor, éditions Érès, coll. « La vie de l'enfant » (ISBN 978-2749239309)
  - 2015 : Enfances, adolescences, Librio (ISBN 978-2290101667)
  - 2018 : Une nuit à Manosque, éditions Gallimard (ISBN 978-2072820090)

=== Literary directions ===
- 2009 : Et maintenant un livre, éditions du Centre Dramatique National d'Orléans54.
- 2010 : Et encore un livre, éditions du Centre Dramatique National d'Orléans.
- 2011 : Et toujours un livre, éditions du Centre Dramatique National d'Orléans.
- 2012 : À nouveau un livre, éditions du Centre Dramatique National d'Orléans.

=== Audios ===
- 2004 : Claire dans la forêt, lu par l'auteur, éditions des femmes, coll. « Bibliothèque des voix ».
- 2016 : Être ici est une splendeur. Vie de Paula M. Becker, lue par l'auteur, éditions des femmes, coll. « Bibliothèque des voix ».

=== Theatrical adaptations ===
- 2004 : Le Bébé, mise en scène de Marc Goldberg, Vingtième Théâtre.
- 2008 : Naissance des fantômes, mise en scène de Cécile Quaranta, La Minoterie, Marseille.
- 2009 : Le Musée de la mer, mise en scène d'Arthur Nauzyciel, Carré Saint-Vincent, Orléans.
- 2011 : Le Musée de la mer, mise en scène d'Arthur Nauzyciel, Théâtre de Gennevilliers.
- 2011 : Truismes, mise en scène d'Alfredo Arias, Théâtre du Rond-Point.
- 2011 : Tom est mort, lecture dirigée par Arthur Nauzyciel, Centre dramatique national.

=== On Marie Darrieussecq ===
- Marie Fleury Wullschleger, « Du déchet au dégoût. Une lecture de Truisme de Marie Darrieussecq », A contrario, n° 19, janvier 2013.
- Colette Sarrey-Strack, Fictions contemporaines au féminin : Marie Darrieussecq, Marie Ndiaye, Marie Nimier, Marie Redonnet, L'Harmattan, 2003.
- Colette Trout, Marie Darrieussecq ou voir le monde à neuf, éditions Rodopi, 2016.
- Dominique Carlini Versini, Figures de l'excès chez Marie Darrieusssecq, Virginie Despentes et Marina de Van: Ecrire et filmer le corps-frontière, Brill, 2023.
