= Biton =

Biton (Hebrew: ביטון) is a Maghrebi Jewish surname which is common in Israel. It may refer to:

- Avraham Biton (1923–2005), Israeli politician
- Charlie Biton (1947–2024), former Israeli politician
- Dan Biton (born 1961), general in the Israel Defense Forces
- Dan Biton (footballer) (born 1995), Israeli footballer
- Dudu Biton (1988), Israeli footballer
- Erez Biton (born 1942), Israeli poet born in Oran
- Haim Biton (born 1978), Israeli politician
- Michael Biton (born 1970), Israeli politician
- Moshe Biton (born 1982), Israeli footballer
- Nir Biton (born 1991), Israeli footballer
- Ori Biton (born 1987), Israeli footballer
- Yifat Shasha-Biton (born 1973), Israeli educator and politician
- Yifat Bitton (born 1971), Israeli law professor

== See also ==
- Eyal Golan (born Eyal Biton), Israeli singer
- Bitòn Coulibaly (1689? – 1755), founder of the Bambara Empire
- Biton (disambiguation)
- Bitton
- Byton
