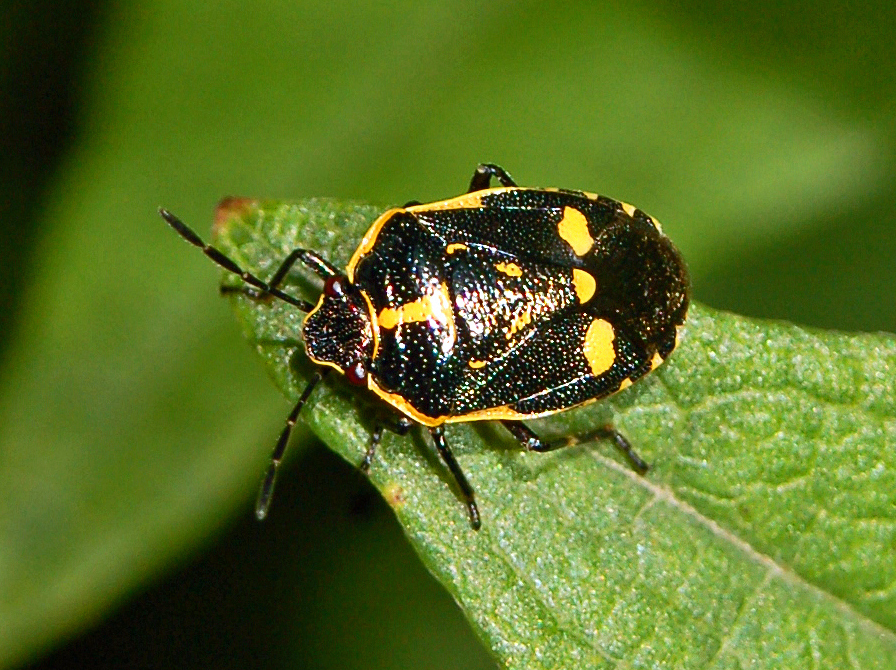
- Eurydema oleracea, yellow markings

Scientific classification
- Kingdom: Animalia
- Phylum: Arthropoda
- Class: Insecta
- Order: Hemiptera
- Suborder: Heteroptera
- Family: Pentatomidae
- Genus: Eurydema
- Species: E. oleracea

Binomial name
- Eurydema oleracea (Linnaeus, 1758)

Synonyms
- Eurydema oleracea Linnaeus, 1758; Eurydema lineola lineola (Barensprung, 1859); Eurydema nevadensis lineola (Lindberg, 1932); Eurydema consobrina (Puton, 1871)

= Eurydema oleracea =

Species of true bug

Eurydema oleracea is a species of shield bug in the family Pentatomidae commonly known as the rape bug, crucifer shield bug, cabbage bug, or brassica bug.

Its specific name oleracea means "related to vegetables/herbs" in Latin and is a form of holeraceus (oleraceus).

== Morphology and biology ==
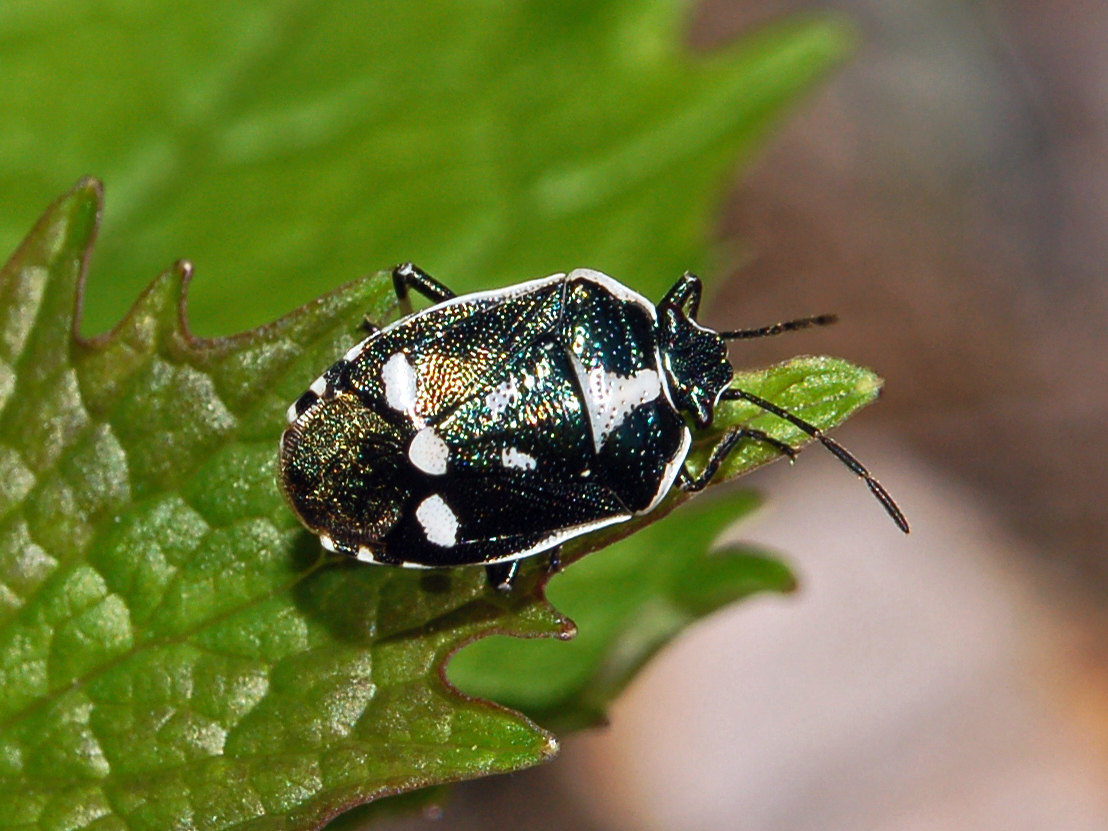
Eurydema oleracea, white markings

The rape bug has a shiny, flat, dark-colored body about 5–7 mm (0.20–0.28 in) long and 4 mm (0.16 in) wide. The species has a dark ground colour, which is overlain with red, yellow, cream, white, or orange markings. An oval spot is on the top of the mesonotum and one on each of the elytra, as well as a longitudinal stripe on the prothorax. In young adults, these spots are yellow, but change to white or red in older bugs. The colour of the abdomen changes at the same time from buff to black. Such age-specific changes in the imago coloration are connected with sexual maturation of the bugs and often take place in diapausing imagos at the time they are becoming active again.

video

The eggs are cylindrical and buff-colored with a dark pattern. They are laid on the stems and inflorescences of host plants in batches usually of about 12 eggs in two neat rows. Each female lays 60 to 80 eggs over a period of 4-6 weeks. The nymph is pale gray with a dark brown pronotum and spots on the dorsal side of the abdomen. It moults five times, and the adults and nymphs live quite openly on plants. Adults overwinter, hibernating in leaf debris at the edge of woods or in bushes.

== Distribution ==
This species has a wide distribution in the eastern Palearctic realm. It is found in Western Europe except for northern Scandinavia, Kazakhstan, most of Russia, the mountainous regions of west and central Asia, and in North Africa.

== Ecology ==
These species overwinter as adults, emerging in late spring. One generation occurs in the northern part of their range and two occur in the south. The adults and nymphs are consumers of a wide range of cruciferous plants (Brassicaceae), feeding mainly on the flowering parts. Among cultivated crops, the bugs damage cabbage, radish, turnip, rutabaga, horseradish, and rape. They can also develop on many species of wild cruciferous plants. Their natural enemies include a number of species of parasitoid wasps in the family Scelionidae, some species of predatory bugs in the family Nabidae, a rare parasitic fly Clytiomya continua, and some spiders and ants. They can be controlled by crop rotation, the destruction of cruciferous weeds, and the use of insecticides.

== Gallery ==
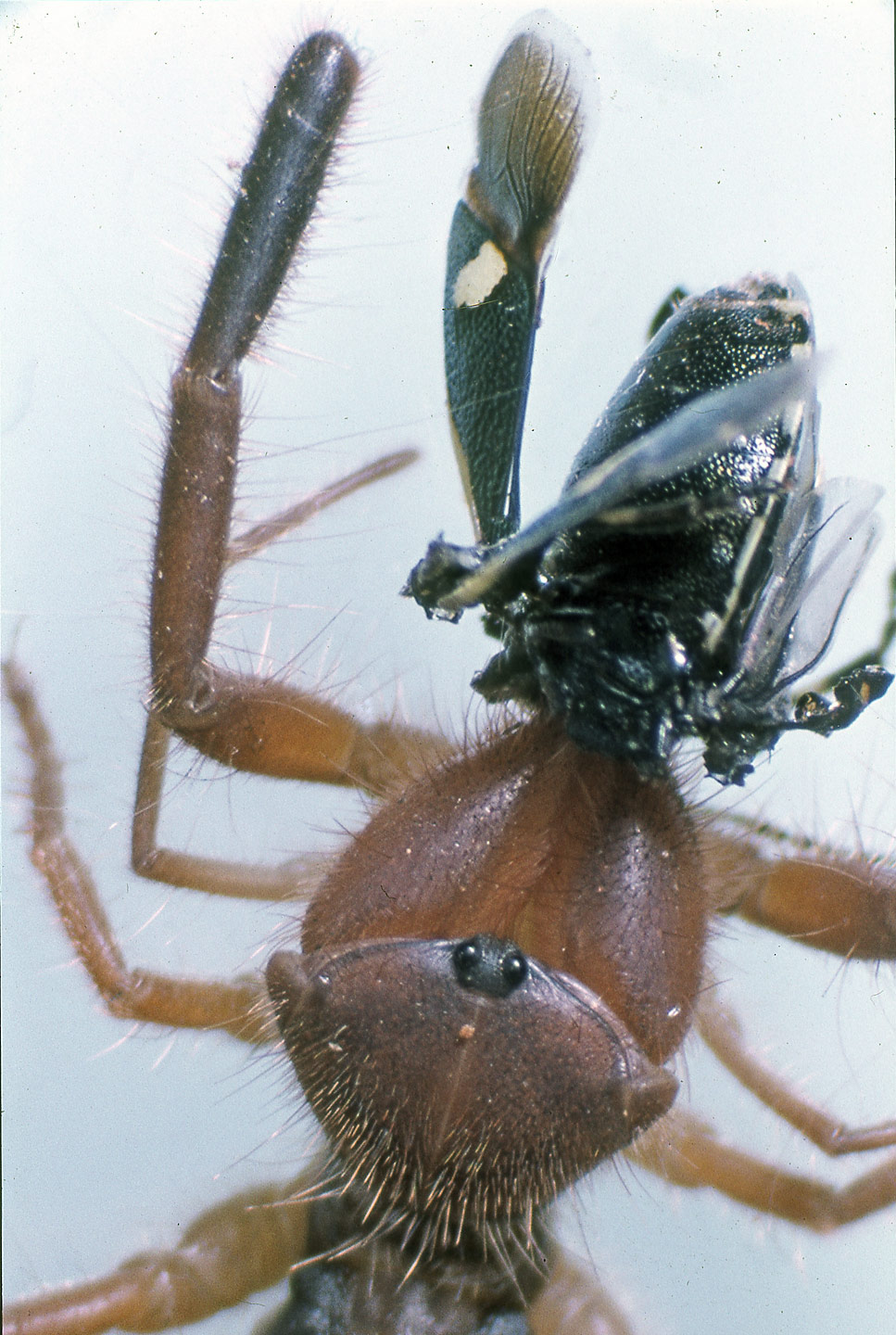
Gluvia dorsalis eating a Eurydema oleracea

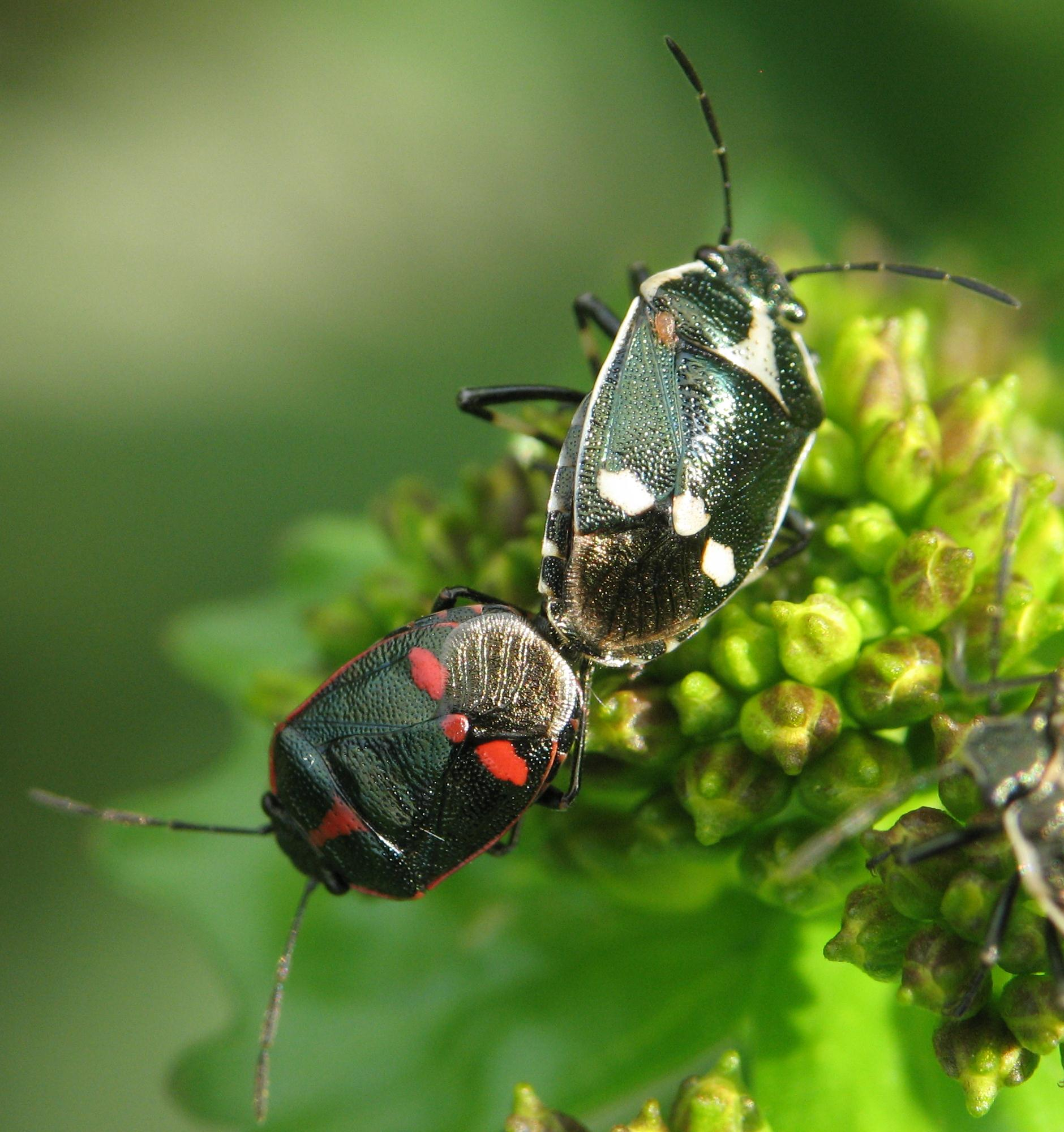
Mating pair

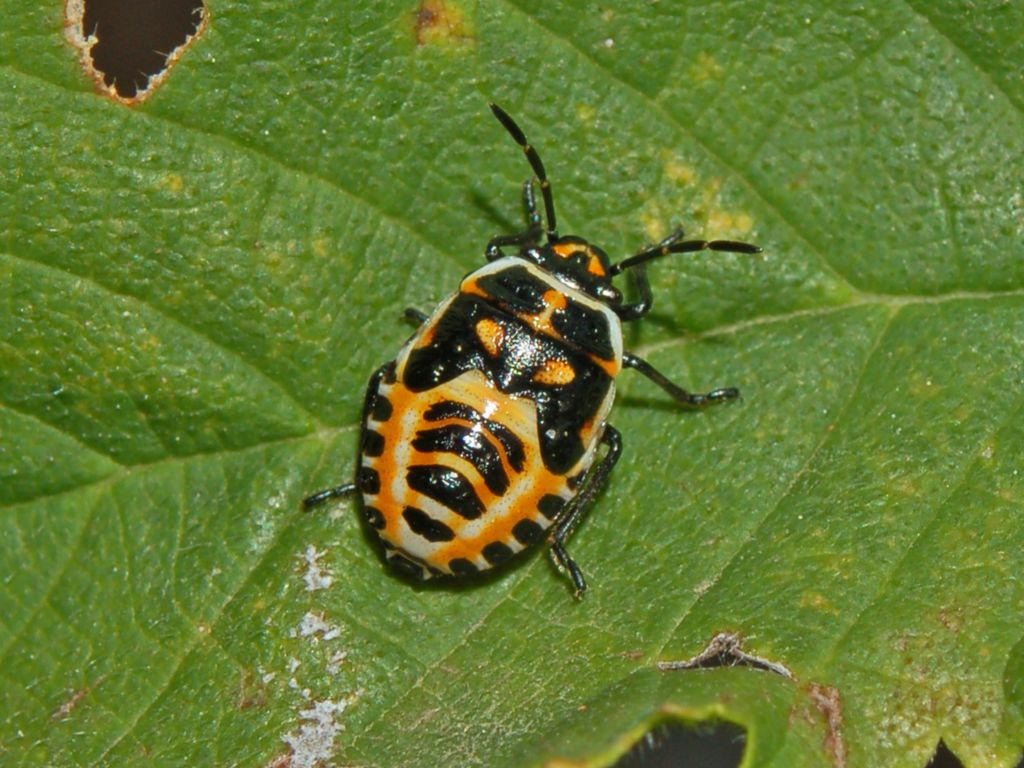
Nymph

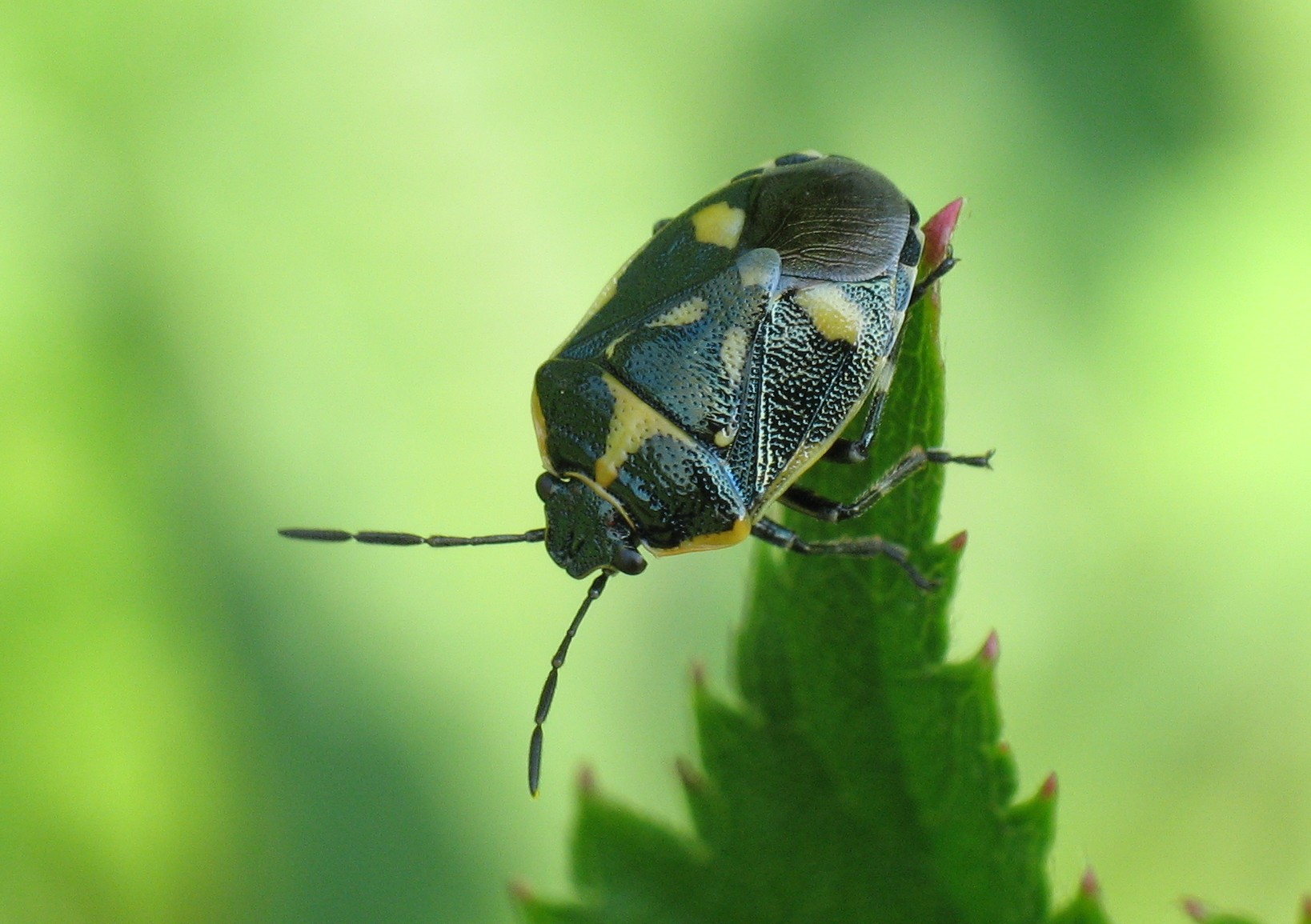
Adult

== See also ==
- List of shield bug species of Great Britain
