= Ceratobiton =

Scientific classification
- Domain: Eukaryota
- Kingdom: Animalia
- Phylum: Arthropoda
- Subphylum: Chelicerata
- Class: Arachnida
- Order: Solifugae
- Family: Daesiidae
- Genus: Ceratobiton; Delle Cave & Simonetta, 1971
- Species: C. styloceros

Binomial name
- Ceratobiton styloceros (Kraepelin, 1899)

Genus of camel spiders

Ceratobiton is a monotypic genus of daesiid camel spiders, first described by Delle Cave and Simonetta in 1971. Its single species, Ceratobiton styloceros is distributed in Israel and Jordan.
