= Triditarsula =

Scientific classification
- Domain: Eukaryota
- Kingdom: Animalia
- Phylum: Arthropoda
- Subphylum: Chelicerata
- Class: Arachnida
- Order: Solifugae
- Family: Daesiidae
- Genus: Triditarsula; Roewer, 1933
- Species: T. anomala

Binomial name
- Triditarsula anomala Roewer, 1933

Genus of camel spiders

Triditarsula is a monotypic genus of daesiid camel spiders, first described by Carl Friedrich Roewer in 1933. The single species, Triditarsula anomala is distributed in Ethiopia.
