= Gluviopsis =

Scientific classification
- Domain: Eukaryota
- Kingdom: Animalia
- Phylum: Arthropoda
- Subphylum: Chelicerata
- Class: Arachnida
- Order: Solifugae
- Family: Daesiidae
- Genus: Gluviopsis; Kraepelin, 1899

Type species
- Gluviopsis rufescens (Pocock, 1897)

Species
- 11, see text

Genus of camel spiders

Gluviopsis is a genus of daesiid camel spiders, first described by Karl Kraepelin in 1899.

== Species ==
As of October 2022, the World Solifugae Catalog accepts the following eleven species:

- Gluviopsis atrata Pocock, 1900 — India
- Gluviopsis balfouri (Pocock, 1895) — Yemen
- Gluviopsis butes Delle Cave & Simonetta, 1971 — Somalia
- Gluviopsis caporiaccoi Vachon, 1950 — Niger
- Gluviopsis microphthalmus Birula, 1937 — Turkmenistan
- Gluviopsis nigripalpis (Pocock, 1897) — Ethiopia, Somalia
- Gluviopsis nigrocinctus Birula, 1905 — Afghanistan, Azerbaijan, Iran, Tajikistan, Turkmenistan
- Gluviopsis paphlagoniae Turk, 1960 — Turkey
- Gluviopsis rivae (Pavesi, 1897) — Somalia
- Gluviopsis rufescens (Pocock, 1897) — Djibouti, Greece (Rhodes), Iraq, Somalia, Yemen
- Gluviopsis somalica Roewer, 1933 — Somalia
