= Haarlovina =

Scientific classification
- Domain: Eukaryota
- Kingdom: Animalia
- Phylum: Arthropoda
- Subphylum: Chelicerata
- Class: Arachnida
- Order: Solifugae
- Family: Daesiidae
- Genus: Haarlovina; Lawrence, 1956
- Species: H. nielsi

Binomial name
- Haarlovina nielsi Lawrence, 1956

Genus of camel spiders

Haarlovina is a monotypic genus of daesiid camel spiders, first described by Reginald Frederick Lawrence in 1956. Its single species, Haarlovina nielsi is distributed in Afghanistan.
