= Triditarsus =

Scientific classification
- Domain: Eukaryota
- Kingdom: Animalia
- Phylum: Arthropoda
- Subphylum: Chelicerata
- Class: Arachnida
- Order: Solifugae
- Family: Daesiidae
- Genus: Triditarsus; Roewer, 1933

Type species
- Triditarsus tibetanus Roewer, 1933

Species
- 2, see text

Genus of camel spiders

Triditarsus is a genus of daesiid camel spiders, first described by Carl Friedrich Roewer in 1933.

== Species ==
As of October 2022, the World Solifugae Catalog accepts the following two species:

- Triditarsus tarimensis Roewer, 1933 — China
- Triditarsus tibetanus Roewer, 1933 — China
