= Gluviella =

Scientific classification
- Domain: Eukaryota
- Kingdom: Animalia
- Phylum: Arthropoda
- Subphylum: Chelicerata
- Class: Arachnida
- Order: Solifugae
- Family: Daesiidae
- Genus: Gluviella; Caporiacco, 1948
- Species: G. rhodiensis

Binomial name
- Gluviella rhodiensis Caporiacco, 1948

Genus of camel spiders

Gluviella is a monotypic genus of daesiid camel spiders, first described by Ludovico di Caporiacco in 1948. Its single species, Gluviella rhodiensis is distributed in Greece (Rhodes).
