= Šamorín =

Šamorín Somorja
- Municipality
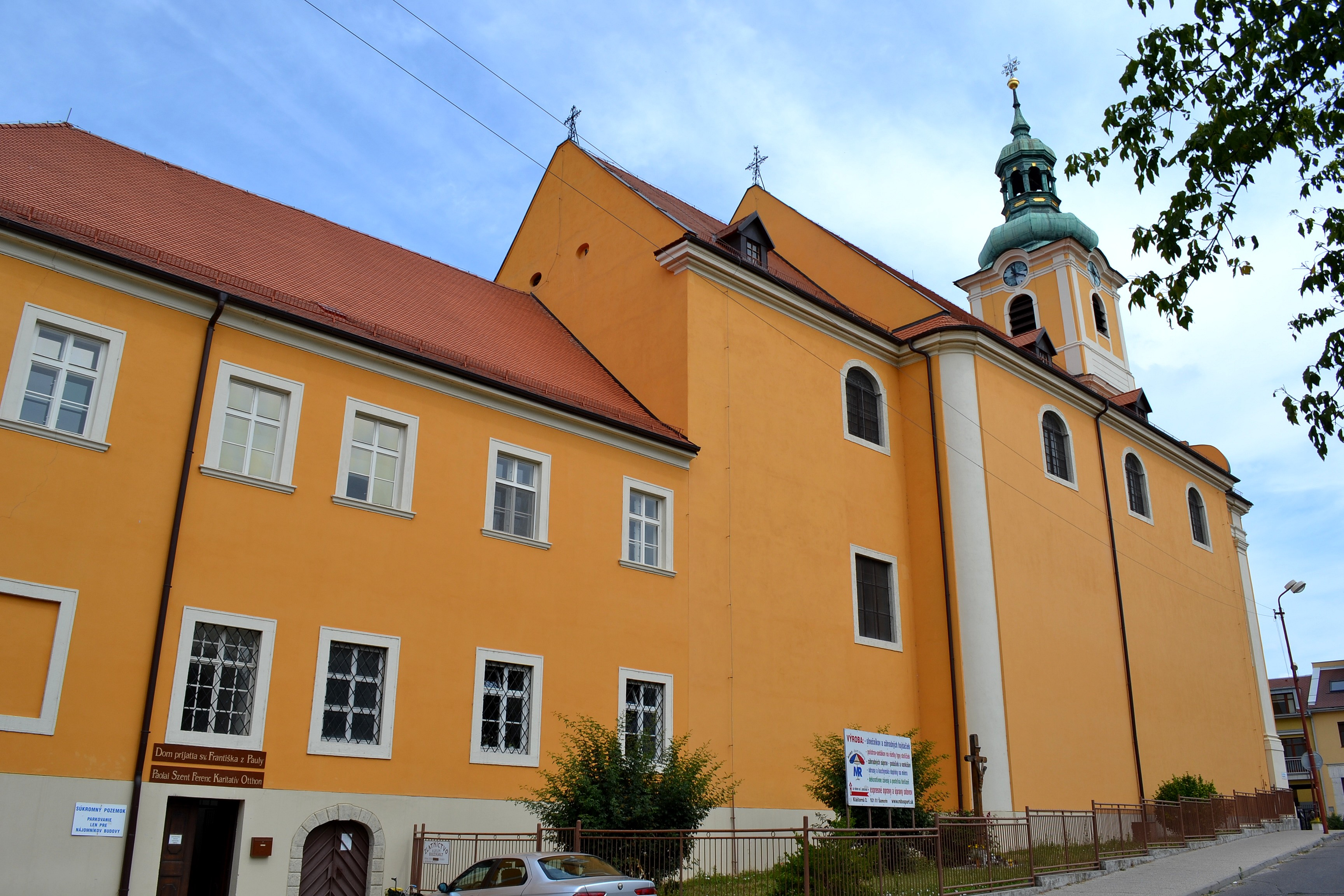

- Flag Coat of arms

- Location of Šamorín in the Trnava Region Location of Šamorín in Slovakia
- Coordinates: 48.03°N 17.31°E
- Country: Slovakia
- Region: Trnava Region
- District: Dunajská Streda District
- First mentioned: 1287

Government
  - Mayor: Krisztián Muska (MOST-HID)
  - Vice Mayor: Ádám Nagy

Area
  - Total: 44.34 km^{2} (17.12 sq mi)
- Elevation: 125 m (410 ft)

Population (2025)
  - Total: 13,622

Ethnicity
- Time zone: UTC+1 (CET)
  - Summer (DST): UTC+2 (CEST)
- Postal code: 930 01
- Area code: +421 31
- Vehicle registration plate (until 2022): DS
- Website: www.samorin.sk

Šamorín (Slovak pronunciation: [ˈʂamɔriːn]; Hungarian: Somorja, German: Sommerein) is a small town in western Slovakia, southeast of Bratislava.

== Etymology ==
The name is derived from a patron saint of a local church Sancta Maria, mentioned for the first time as villa Sancti Marie (1285). Today's name is an adaptation of the original name: Zent Maria – Samaria – Somoria – Šamorín.

== Geography ==
The municipality lies at an altitude of 125 metres (410 ft) and covers an area of 44.34 km^{2} (17.12 sq mi) (2025).

The town is located on the Danubian Flat in the Žitný ostrov island, near the Gabčíkovo dam by the Danube around 17 kilometres (11 miles) southeast of Bratislava and 25 kilometres (16 miles) west of Dunajská Streda. Administratively, the town belongs to the Trnava Region, Dunajská Streda District.

== History ==
The oldest artifacts indicating the settlement of the area are dated to the Neolithic and Eneolithic Period. The settlement of the location is documented also for the Bronze Age and the Iron Age. Later archaeologic research (2008) uncovered artifacts from the Early and High Middle Ages (remnants of settlements, dwellings, farm buildings).

After the Mongol invasion, the village was settled by German "guests" who had the leading role in the town administration. The German minority was given a royal privilege to apply Pressburg Law (now Bratislava) and lived in the town until the end of the Middle Ages. The presence of other ethnic groups like Pechenegs and Székelys is also documented.

The small Hungarian town was mentioned for the first time in 1238 as ecclesia Sancte Mariae and was a prominent port by the Danube during the Middle Ages and the market center of Rye Island. Agriculture also played a major role in the town's development. As a result of this prosperity, its citizens enjoyed a brisk trade in the new technologies and many shipyards on the Danube. However, with rise of Pressburg, the importance of the town began declining. Šamorín eventually lost its right to the status of royal free city granted in 1405 during the reign of Hungarian King Sigismund. In the sixteenth century, the city became notable again because of the witch trials held there. After the Austro-Hungarian army disintegrated in November 1918, Czechoslovak troops occupied the area, later acknowledged internationally (contested by Hungary) by the Treaty of Trianon. Between 1938 and 1945 Šamorín (Somorja) once more became a part of Hungary under Miklós Horthy through the First Vienna Award. From 1945 until the Velvet Divorce, it was part of Czechoslovakia. Since then it has been part of Slovakia.

== Demography ==
Historical population
Year	Pop.	±%
1970	7,112	—
1980	9,677	+36.1%
1991	12,051	+24.5%
2001	12,143	+0.8%
2011	12,726	+4.8%
2021	13,628	+7.1%
Source: Censuses

Population statistic (10 years)
Year	1995	2005	2015	2025
Count	12,231	12,481	13,147	13,622
Difference		+2.04%	+5.33%	+3.61%

Population statistic
Year	2024	2025
Count	13,672	13,622
Difference		−0.36%

It has a population of 13,622 people (31 December 2025).

=== Ethnicity ===
Census 2021 (1+ %)
Ethnicity	Number	Fraction
Hungarian	7183	52.7%
Slovak	5974	43.83%
Not found out	1163	8.53%
Total	13,628	

In year 2021 was 13,628 people by ethnicity 7183 as Hungarian, 5974 as Slovak, 1163 as Not found out, 102 as Czech, 71 as Other, 65 as Romani, 35 as Ukrainian, 30 as Russian, 18 as German, 13 as Rusyn, 11 as Turkish, 10 as Italian, 8 as Serbian, 8 as Bulgarian, 7 as Albanian, 6 as Chinese, 6 as Vietnamese, 5 as Polish, 5 as Croatian, 3 as Romanian, 3 as French, 2 as Jewish, 2 as Moravian, 2 as Canadian, 2 as Greek, 2 as English and 1 as Austrian.

Note on population: The difference values of population numbers in the table "Population statistic" and in the sections "Ethnicity" & "Religion" is caused by the use of various statistical methods.

In 1910, the town had a total population of 2,930, which included 2,699 (92.12%) Hungarians, 112 (3.82%) Germans and 114 (3.89%) Slovaks. According to the 1991 census, ethnic groups included 71% Hungarians and 27.4% Slovaks.
According to the 2001 census, ethnic groups included 66.63% Hungarians and 30.96% Slovaks. According to the 2021 census, ethnic groups included 49.55% Hungarians and 41.11% Slovaks.

=== Religion ===
Census 2021 (1+ %)
Religion	Number	Fraction
Roman Catholic Church	7401	54.31%
None	3637	26.69%
Not found out	1154	8.47%
Evangelical Church	466	3.42%
Calvinist Church	419	3.07%
Greek Catholic Church	162	1.19%
Total	13,628	

In year 2021 was 13,628 people by religion 7401 from Roman Catholic Church, 3637 from None, 1154 from Not found out, 466 from Evangelical Church, 419 from Calvinist Church, 162 from Greek Catholic Church, 80 from Jehovah's Witnesses, 71 from Christian Congregations in Slovakia, 39 from Eastern Orthodox Church, 38 from Other and not ascertained christian church, 35 from Islam, 31 from Other, 25 from Ad hoc movements, 19 from Buddhism, 18 from United Methodist Church, 7 from Baptists Church, 5 from Paganism and natural spirituality, 4 from Old Catholic Church, 4 from Seventh-day Adventist Church, 3 from Hinduism, 3 from Czechoslovak Hussite Church, 3 from Church of the Brethren, 3 from Apostolic Church and 1 from Jewish community.

== Landmarks ==
- The Reformed Church, originally Catholic and built in the 13th century in the late Romanesque style.
- The Catholic Church and its former cloister from the 18th century in the Baroque style.
- The Protestant Church of 1784
- The Synagogue, built in 1912 in a Romanesque Revival style
- The Renaissance-style city hall

== Municipal division ==
Šamorín has five districts: Šamorín (Hungarian: Somorja) proper and the villages of Bučuháza (Hungarian: Bucsuháza), Čilistov (Hungarian: Csölösztő), Kráľovianky (Hungarian: Királyfia), and Mliečno (Hungarian: Tejfalu).

=== Historically incorporated villages ===
- 1808: Gančháza
- 1960: Čilistov
- 1976: Mliečno

== Notable people ==
- Livia Bitton-Jackson (1931–2023), Holocaust survivor and author, writing a three-part series on her journey from Šamorín to New York City
- Pál Skriba (1932–2004), Hungarian painter and teacher
- Tibor Linka (born 1995), sprint canoer, won a gold medal at the 2015 World Championships and a silver medal at the 2016 Olympics

== Twin towns – sister cities ==
Šamorín is twinned with:

- Mosonmagyaróvár, Hungary
- Hainburg an der Donau, Austria
- Gheorgheni, Romania
- Leiderdorp, The Netherlands
