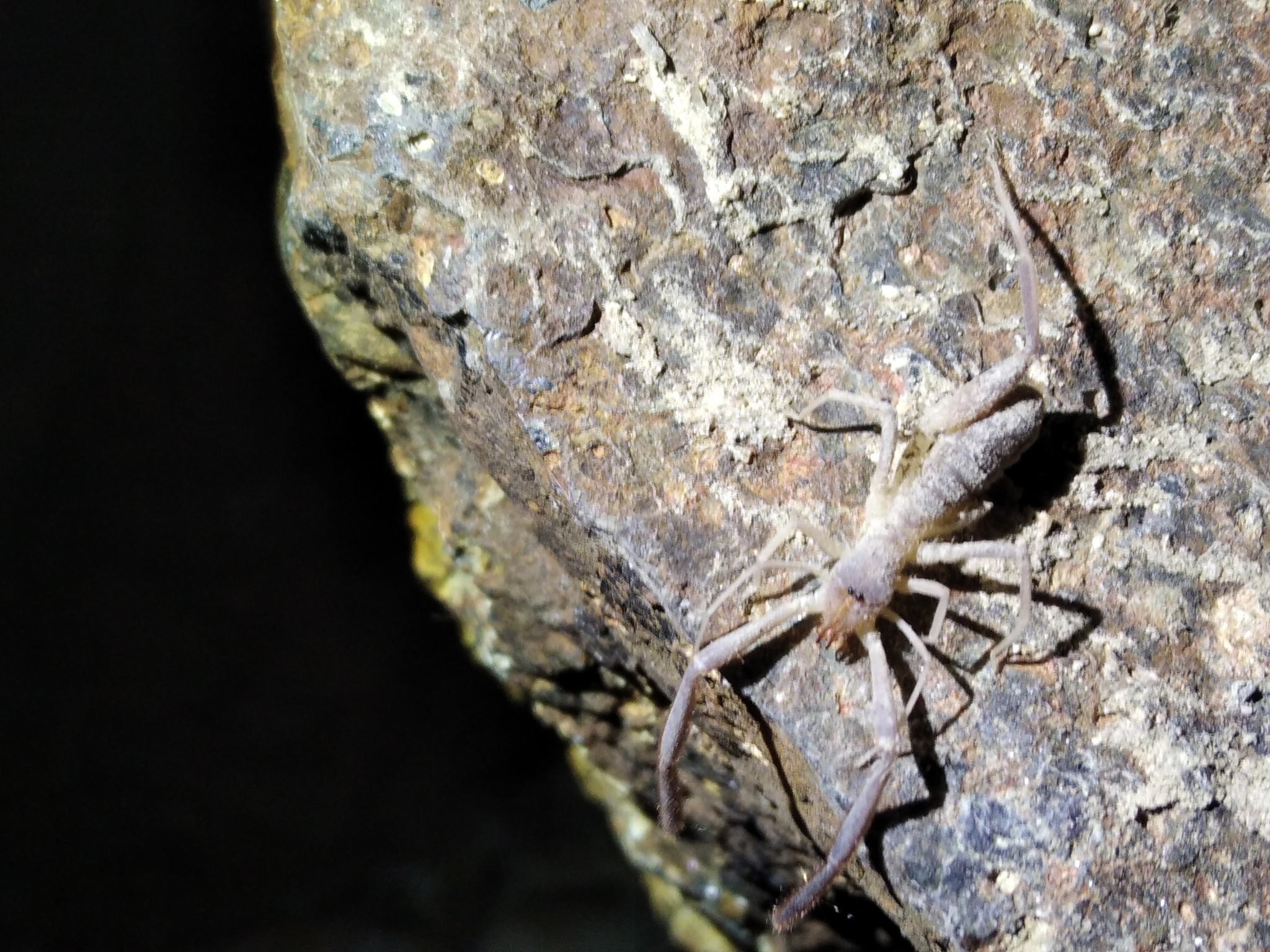
- Blossia falcifera

Scientific classification
- Kingdom: Animalia
- Phylum: Arthropoda
- Subphylum: Chelicerata
- Class: Arachnida
- Order: Solifugae
- Family: Daesiidae
- Genus: Blossia; Simon, 1880

Type species
- Blossia spinosa Simon, 1880

Species
- 59, see text

= Blossia =

Genus of camel spiders

Blossia is a genus of daesiid camel spiders, first described by Eugène Simon in 1880.

== Species ==
As of October 2022, the World Solifugae Catalog accepts the following fifty-nine species:

- Blossia aegyptica (Roewer, 1933) — Egypt, Israel
- Blossia albocaudata Levy & Shulov, 1964 — Israel
- Blossia alticursor Lawrence, 1929 — South Africa
- Blossia anatolica (Roewer, 1941) — Turkey
- Blossia angolensis (Lawrence, 1960) — Angola
- Blossia arabica (Roewer, 1933) — Yemen
- Blossia brincki (Lawrence, 1955) — South Africa
- Blossia clunigera Kraepelin, 1908 — Namibia, South Africa
- Blossia costata (Roewer, 1933) — Namibia
- Blossia crepidulifera Purcell, 1902 — South Africa
- Blossia ebneri (Roewer, 1933) — Israel, Morocco
- Blossia echinata Purcell, 1903 — South Africa
- Blossia electa Roewer, 1933 — Morocco
- Blossia falcifera Kraepelin, 1908 — Namibia, South Africa, Zimbabwe
- Blossia filicornis Hewitt, 1914 — Namibia
- Blossia fimbriata Kraepelin, 1914 — Namibia
- Blossia fradei (Lawrence, 1960) — Angola
- Blossia gaerdesi (Lawrence, 1972) — Namibia
- Blossia gluvioides (Roewer, 1933) — Mauritania
- Blossia grandicornis Lawrence, 1929 — South Africa
- Blossia hessei Lawrence, 1929 — South Africa
- Blossia homodonta (Lawrence, 1972) — Namibia
- Blossia karrooica Purcell, 1902 — South Africa
- Blossia laminicornis Hewitt, 1919 — South Africa
- Blossia lapidicola (Lawrence, 1935) — South Africa
- Blossia laticosta Hewitt, 1919 — Somalia?, Israel, South Africa
- Blossia litoralis Purcell, 1903 — South Africa
- Blossia longipalpis (Lawrence, 1935) — Angola, Namibia
- Blossia macilenta (Lawrence, 1968) — South Africa
- Blossia maraisi Hewitt, 1915 — South Africa
- Blossia maroccana (Roewer, 1933) — Morocco
- Blossia massaica Roewer, 1933 — Tanzania
- Blossia namaquensis Purcell, 1902 — Namibia, South Africa
- Blossia nigripalpis (Roewer, 1933) — Israel, Somalia
- Blossia obscura Kraepelin, 1908 — Botswana
- Blossia obsti (Roewer, 1933) — Tanzania
- Blossia occidentalis (Roewer, 1933) — Israel, Morocco, Western Sahara
- Blossia omeri (Levy & Shulov, 1964) — Israel
- Blossia orangica (Lawrence, 1935) — South Africa
- Blossia pallideflava (Lawrence, 1972) — South Africa
- Blossia parva (Roewer, 1933) — Namibia, South Africa
- Blossia planicursor Wharton, 1981 — Namibia
- Blossia pringlei (Lamoral, 1974) — South Africa
- Blossia purpurea Wharton, 1981 — Namibia
- Blossia quadripilosa (Lawrence, 1960) — Angola
- Blossia robusta (Lawrence, 1972) — Namibia
- Blossia rooica Wharton, 1981 — Namibia
- Blossia rosea (Lawrence, 1935) — South Africa
- Blossia sabulosa (Lawrence, 1972) — Namibia
- Blossia scapicornis (Lawrence, 1972) — South Africa
- Blossia schulzei (Lawrence, 1972) — Namibia
- Blossia setifera Pocock, 1900 — Zimbabwe
- Blossia singularis (Lawrence, 1965) — South Africa
- Blossia spinicornis Lawrence, 1928 — Namibia
- Blossia spinosa Simon, 1880 — Algeria, Egypt, Israel, Morocco, Sudan, Tunisia
- Blossia sulcichelis (Roewer, 1941) — Tanzania
- Blossia toschii (Caporiacco, 1949) — Kenya
- Blossia tricolor Hewitt, 1914 — Namibia
- Blossia unguicornis Purcell, 1902 — South Africa
