= Gluviola =

Scientific classification
- Domain: Eukaryota
- Kingdom: Animalia
- Phylum: Arthropoda
- Subphylum: Chelicerata
- Class: Arachnida
- Order: Solifugae
- Family: Daesiidae
- Genus: Gluviola; Roewer, 1933
- Species: G. armata

Binomial name
- Gluviola armata (Birula, 1905)

Genus of camel spiders

Gluviola is a monotypic genus of daesiid camel spiders, first described by Carl Friedrich Roewer in 1933. Its single species, Gluviola armata is distributed in Iran.
