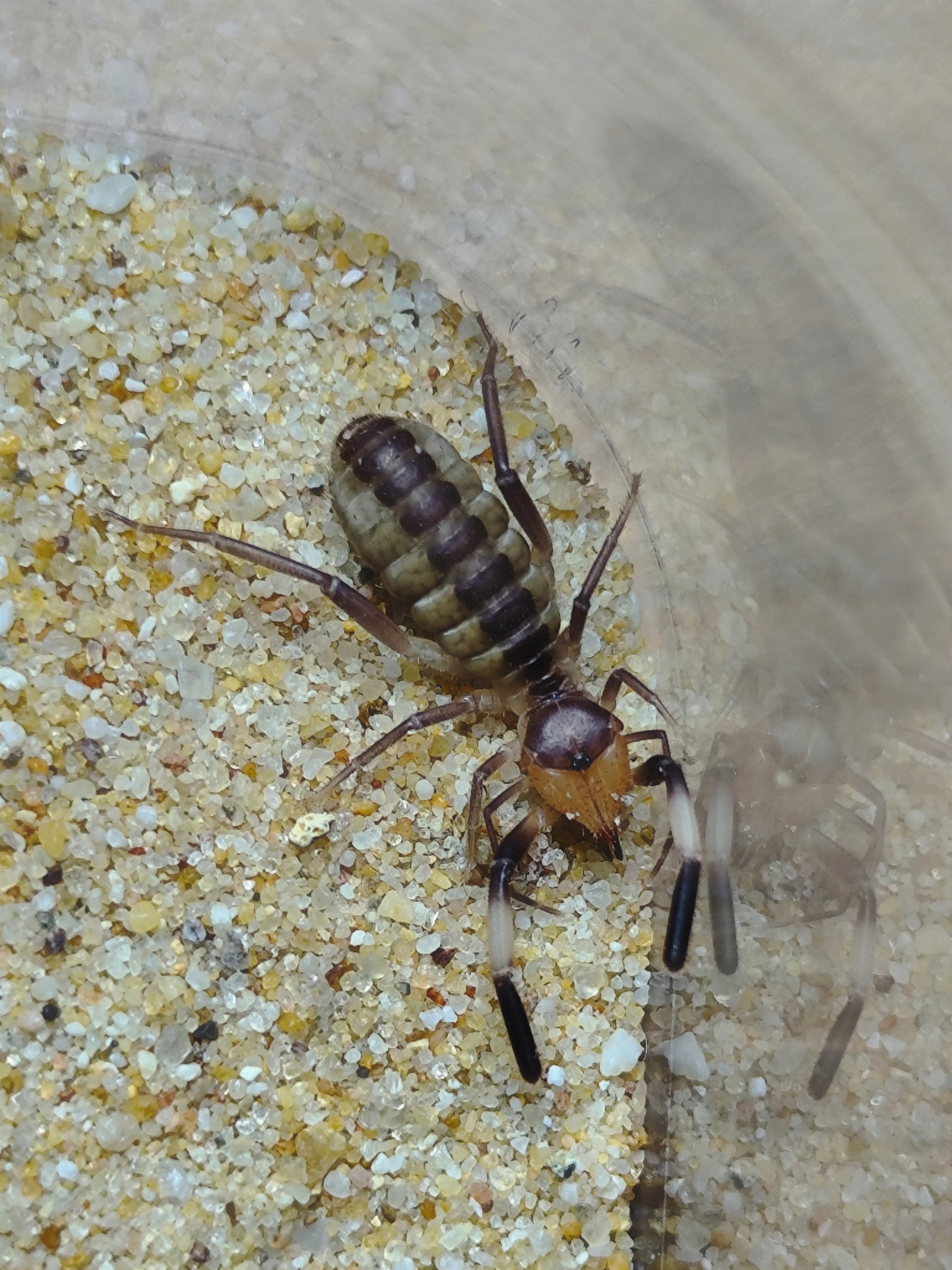
- Gluviopsilla discolor

Scientific classification
- Domain: Eukaryota
- Kingdom: Animalia
- Phylum: Arthropoda
- Subphylum: Chelicerata
- Class: Arachnida
- Order: Solifugae
- Family: Daesiidae
- Genus: Gluviopsilla; Roewer, 1933
- Species: G. discolor

Binomial name
- Gluviopsilla discolor (Kraepelin, 1899)

= Gluviopsilla =

Genus of camel spiders

Gluviopsilla is a monotypic genus of daesiid camel spiders, first described by Carl Friedrich Roewer in 1933. Its single species, Gluviopsilla discolor is distributed in Algeria, Greece (Rhodes), Iran, Somalia, Syria and Turkey.
