= Gluviopsona =

Scientific classification
- Domain: Eukaryota
- Kingdom: Animalia
- Phylum: Arthropoda
- Subphylum: Chelicerata
- Class: Arachnida
- Order: Solifugae
- Family: Daesiidae
- Genus: Gluviopsona; Roewer, 1933

Type species
- Gluviopsona persica (Birula, 1905)

Species
- 3, see text

Genus of camel spiders

Gluviopsona is a genus of daesiid camel spiders, first described by Carl Friedrich Roewer in 1933.

== Species ==
As of October 2022, the World Solifugae Catalog accepts the following three species:

- Gluviopsona lahavi Levy & Shulov, 1964 — Israel
- Gluviopsona nova Turk, 1960 — Jordan
- Gluviopsona persica (Birula, 1905) — Iran
