= Blossiana =

Scientific classification
- Domain: Eukaryota
- Kingdom: Animalia
- Phylum: Arthropoda
- Subphylum: Chelicerata
- Class: Arachnida
- Order: Solifugae
- Family: Daesiidae
- Genus: Blossiana; Roewer, 1933
- Species: B. wachei

Binomial name
- Blossiana wachei Roewer, 1933

Genus of camel spiders

Blossiana is a monotypic genus of daesiid camel spiders, first described by Carl Friedrich Roewer in 1933. Its single species, Blossiana wachei is distributed in Ethiopia.
