= Mumaella =

Scientific classification
- Domain: Eukaryota
- Kingdom: Animalia
- Phylum: Arthropoda
- Subphylum: Chelicerata
- Class: Arachnida
- Order: Solifugae
- Family: Daesiidae
- Genus: Mumaella; Harvey, 2002
- Species: M. robusta

Binomial name
- Mumaella robusta (Lawrence, 1956)

Genus of camel spiders

Mumaella is a monotypic genus of daesiid camel spiders, first described by Mark Harvey in 2002. Its single species, Mumaella robusta is distributed in Afghanistan.
