= Hemiblossia =

Scientific classification
- Domain: Eukaryota
- Kingdom: Animalia
- Phylum: Arthropoda
- Subphylum: Chelicerata
- Class: Arachnida
- Order: Solifugae
- Family: Daesiidae
- Genus: Hemiblossia; Kraepelin, 1899

Type species
- Hemiblossia bouvieri Kraepelin, 1899

Species
- 18, see text

Genus of camel spiders

Hemiblossia is a genus of daesiid camel spiders, first described by Karl Kraepelin in 1899.

== Species ==
As of October 2022, the World Solifugae Catalog accepts the following eighteen species:

- Hemiblossia australis (Purcell, 1902) — Namibia, South Africa, Zimbabwe
- Hemiblossia bouvieri Kraepelin, 1899 — Angola, Kenya, Namibia, South Africa, Zambia, Zimbabwe
- Hemiblossia brunnea Lawrence, 1953 — Kenya
- Hemiblossia etosha Lawrence, 1927 — Namibia
- Hemiblossia evangelina Lawrence, 1968 — South Africa
- Hemiblossia idioceras Hewitt, 1917 — Namibia, South Africa
- Hemiblossia kalaharica Kraepelin, 1908 — Botswana
- Hemiblossia lawrencei Roewer, 1933 — Namibia
- Hemiblossia machadoi Lawrence, 1960 — Angola
- Hemiblossia michaelseni Roewer, 1933 — Namibia
- Hemiblossia monocerus Hewitt, 1927 — Zimbabwe
- Hemiblossia nama Lawrence, 1968 — South Africa
- Hemiblossia nigritarsis Lawrence, 1960 — Angola, Namibia
- Hemiblossia oneili Purcell, 1902 — Namibia, South Africa
- Hemiblossia robusta Lawrence, 1972 — Namibia
- Hemiblossia rubropurpurea Lawrence, 1955 — Namibia, Zimbabwe
- Hemiblossia tana (Roewer, 1933) — Ethiopia
- Hemiblossia termitophila Lawrence, 1965 — Namibia, South Africa
