= Gnosippus =

Scientific classification
- Domain: Eukaryota
- Kingdom: Animalia
- Phylum: Arthropoda
- Subphylum: Chelicerata
- Class: Arachnida
- Order: Solifugae
- Family: Daesiidae
- Genus: Gnosippus; Karsch, 1880

Type species
- Gnosippus klunzingeri Karsch, 1880

Species
- 4, see text

Genus of camel spiders

Gnosippus is a genus of daesiid camel spiders, first described by Ferdinand Karsch in 1880.

== Species ==
As of October 2022, the World Solifugae Catalog accepts the following four species:

- Gnosippus anatolicus Roewer, 1961 — Turkey
- Gnosippus franchettii Caporiacco, 1937 — Eritrea
- Gnosippus klunzingeri Karsch, 1880 — Egypt, Guinea-Bissau, Israel
- Gnosippus yemenensis (Simon, 1882) — Oman, Yemen
