= Byton =

Byton may refer to:

- Byton, Herefordshire, a village in England, UK
- Bytoń (village), Bytoń Gmina, Radziejów County, Kuyavian-Pomeranian Voivodeship, Poland
- Gmina Bytoń (the gmina of Bytoń), Radziejów County, Kuyavian-Pomeranian Voivodeship, Poland
- Bytōń (Silesian name for Bytom), Silesian Voivodeship, Poland
- Byton (company), a Chinese automotive marque of Future Mobility Corporation

== See also ==
- Bytown, Upper Canada, United Canadas, British North America
- Thomas Bytton
- Bitton
- Biton
- Ton (disambiguation)
- By (disambiguation)
