= Bitonupa =

Scientific classification
- Domain: Eukaryota
- Kingdom: Animalia
- Phylum: Arthropoda
- Subphylum: Chelicerata
- Class: Arachnida
- Order: Solifugae
- Family: Daesiidae
- Genus: Bitonupa; Roewer, 1933
- Species: B. kraepelini

Binomial name
- Bitonupa kraepelini Roewer, 1933

Genus of camel spiders

Bitonupa is a monotypic genus of daesiid camel spiders, first described by Carl Friedrich Roewer in 1933. Its single species, Bitonupa kraepelini is distributed in Tanzania.
