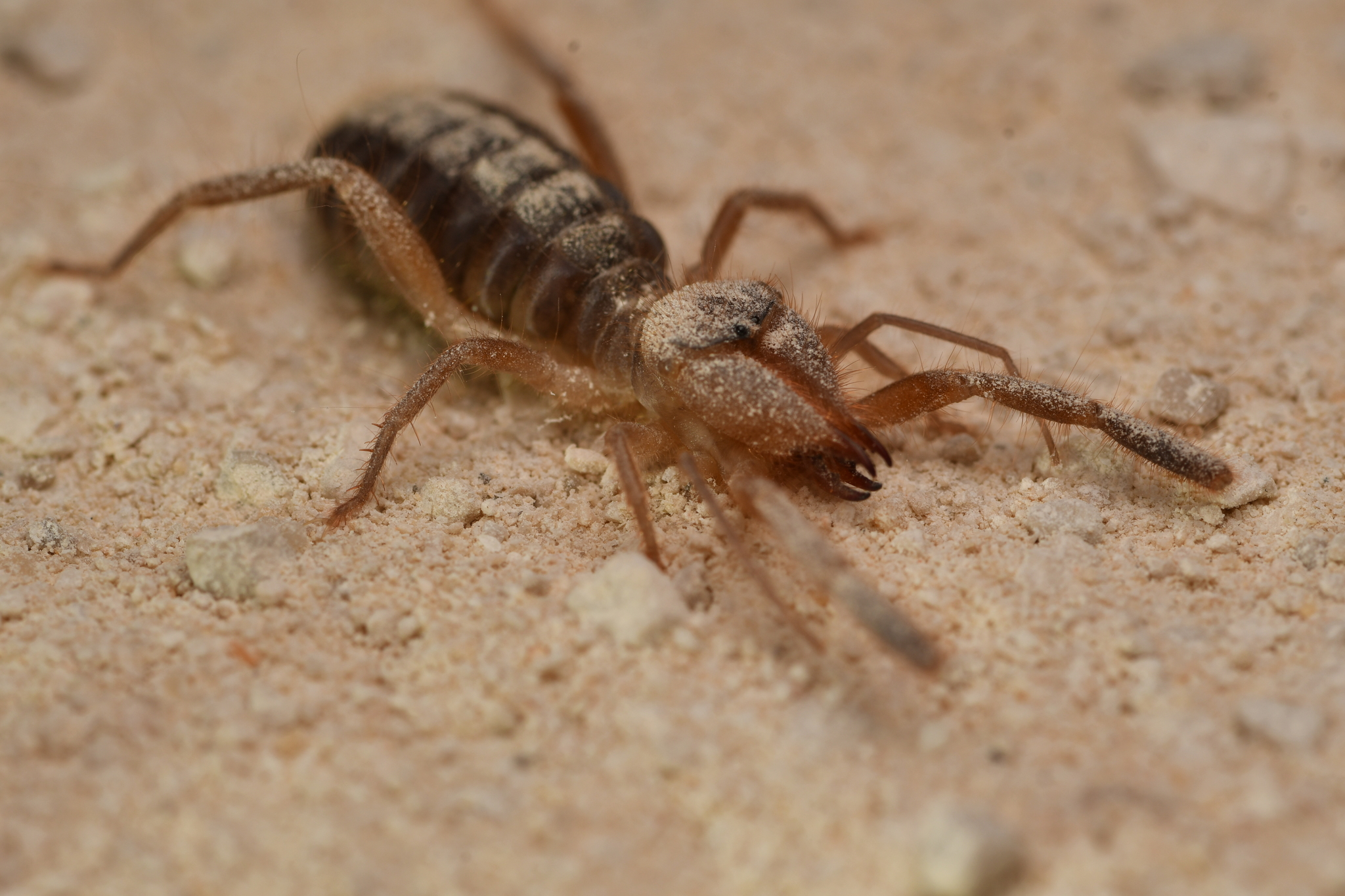

Scientific classification
- Kingdom: Animalia
- Phylum: Arthropoda
- Subphylum: Chelicerata
- Class: Arachnida
- Order: Solifugae
- Family: Daesiidae
- Genus: Gluvia
- Species: G. dorsalis

Binomial name
- Gluvia dorsalis (Latreille, 1817)

Synonyms
- List: Galeodes dorsalis Latreille, 1817; Galeodes intrepidus Dufour, 1820; Gluvia striolata C.L. Koch, 1842; Gluvia minima L. Koch, 1856; Gluvia chapmani Pocock, 1903; Gluvia dorsalis conquensis Pablos, 1967

= Gluvia dorsalis =

Species of arachnid

Gluvia dorsalis is a species of arachnid and one of the species referred to as the Iberian solifuge, being the type species of genus Gluvia, which is endemic to the Iberian Peninsula.

== Description ==
Gluvia dorsalis is a solifuge, a carnivorous arachnid. The species was originally described as the "galeode dorsale"; Galeodes dorsalis, possessing a length of "d'un demi-pouce" and found in the southernmost part of Spain. It was the only valid species of its genus for over 200 years, until Gluvia brunnea was described in 2024. The two species can be distinguished by color, with G. dorsalis possessing yellow areas on its palps and legs, while G. brunnea has a completely brown dorsal region. G. dorsalis' eyes are very close-set, being "as small as half the length of the eyes". The species also lacks a hypertrophied seta ("hair") on the coxa (first leg segment) present on G. brunnea. Further diagnostic characters are exclusive to the adult males, being characters of the flagellum, mucron of the fixed finger, and most notably, a skirt-like row of bristles on the ventral part of the fourth tergite of the opisthosoma ("abdomen"). The species displays some sexual dimorphism; males have narrower propeltidia, wider malleoli, and dense spines on the sclerotized (hardest) parts of their body, while females are larger-bodied.

== Biology ==
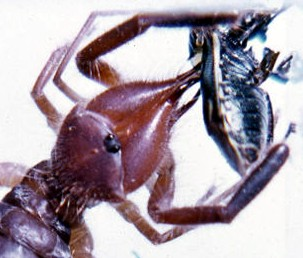
Eating a cabbage bug (Eurydema oleracea)

Gluvia dorsalis strongly prefers open areas, such as pseudo-steppes and pastures, and slopes with some low-growing shrub as cover, showing a marked preference of semi-desert biomes. Only 6% of solifuges collected in the study were found in forested areas. The species is active from late May to early November; periods with lower amounts of precipitation and higher average temperatures. Like many solifuges, it is strictly nocturnal, taking shelter in crevices or within debris during daytime. Females and juveniles were observed to excavate burrows. These solifuges mainly consume arthropods, preferring species without self-defence means such as chemical use. Various ants (Tapinoma & Messor sp.), and spiders are their preferred wild prey, with cannibalism also being observed.

=== Life cycle ===
The species' sex ratio is highly skewed towards females. Reproduction occurs at the beginning of summer; they are seasonal breeders. On average, they lay their eggs 11 days after mating, laying a clutch of 47–163 eggs in a burrow, with the females dying around a week after laying. The eggs hatch around 60 days after being laid in a laboratory setting; it is presumed that they developed twice as fast in the wild due to higher ambient temperatures. G. dorsalis is thought to be a biennial species, overwintering a few times before maturing, with a longevity of ~700 days.
