= Namibesia =

Scientific classification
- Domain: Eukaryota
- Kingdom: Animalia
- Phylum: Arthropoda
- Subphylum: Chelicerata
- Class: Arachnida
- Order: Solifugae
- Family: Daesiidae
- Genus: Namibesia; Lawrence, 1962
- Species: N. pallida

Binomial name
- Namibesia pallida Lawrence, 1962

Genus of camel spiders

Namibesia is a monotypic genus of daesiid camel spiders, first described by Reginald Frederick Lawrence in 1962. Its single species, Namibesia pallida is distributed in Namibia.
