= Valdesia =

Scientific classification
- Domain: Eukaryota
- Kingdom: Animalia
- Phylum: Arthropoda
- Subphylum: Chelicerata
- Class: Arachnida
- Order: Solifugae
- Family: Daesiidae
- Genus: Valdesia; Maury, 1981
- Species: V. simplex

Binomial name
- Valdesia simplex Maury, 1981

Genus of camel spiders

Valdesia is a monotypic genus of daesiid camel spiders, first described by Emilio Antonio Maury in 1981. Its single species, Valdesia simplex is distributed in Argentina.
