= Livia Bitton-Jackson =

American writer (1931–2023)

- Born: Elli L. Friedmann; February 28, 1931; Samorin, Czechoslovakia
- Died: May 17, 2023 (aged 92)
- Education: New York University
- Occupation: Professor of history
- Employer: City University of New York
- Known for: Holocaust survivor
- Notable work: I Have Lived a Thousand Years
- Awards: Christopher Award

Livia Bitton-Jackson (February 28, 1931 – May 17, 2023) was an author of Hungarian-Slovak origin and a Holocaust survivor. She was born as Friedmann Elvira, Elli L. Friedmann in Samorin, Czechoslovakia, She was 13 years old when she, her mother, father, aunt and brother Bubi, were taken to Ghetto Nagymagyar. Eventually, they were transported to Auschwitz, the largest German concentration camp. Her aunt and father perished in the Holocaust, but her mother and brother survived. She, her mother and brother were liberated in 1945. Bitton-Jackson came to the U.S. with her mother on a refugee boat in 1951 to join Bubi, who was studying in New York. She then studied at New York University, from which she received a Ph.D. in Hebrew Culture and Jewish History.

== Early life ==
Elli was born in Samorin, on February 28, 1931, the second child to Laura and Markus Friedmann. Samorin was a historical Hungarian town called Somorja, which was annexed to Czechoslovakia after the First World War. The majority of the population, including Friedman's family, was bi-cultural and spoke both Hungarian and Slovak. Due to the First Vienna Award in 1938, Somorja was reassigned to Hungary. In Somorja, the segregation of Jews began rapidly when the Germans invaded Hungary in 1944. Jews were prohibited from entering theaters, restaurants, grocery stores, and other public places. Two months into the German occupation, all the Jews in that area were moved to Ghetto Nagymagyar. In Ghetto Nagymagyar, all men between the ages of 18 and 45, her father included, were sent to a forced labor camp in Komárom, some fifty miles (80 km) from the ghetto. Two weeks after her father was taken, Bitton-Jackson, her aunt, mother, and brother were removed from the ghetto and taken to Dunajska Streda, a town in Slovakia and then to Auschwitz, the largest concentration camp built by the Germans in occupied Poland. She and her mother stayed there for ten days. In June 1944, Bitton-Jackson and her mother were transferred, along with 500 other women, to Plaszow, a forced labor camp near Kraków. There, their work consisted of planierung - leveling off a hilltop in preparation for construction. If they did not work properly, or violated any rule, they would be beaten by their Kapo or his assistants. After two months at Plaszow, they returned to Auschwitz. She was 13 at the time.

== Germany ==
In August 1944, Bitton-Jackson and her mother were taken from Auschwitz to a factory in the German city of Augsburg. In Augsburg, she was put to work in an assembly line in the factory, where they produced a "precision instrument that is supposed to control the distance and direction of the bomb ejected by a fighter plane". They stayed until April 1945. After this she and her mother were taken to a subsidiary camp of Dachau, in Germany, where she was reunited with her older brother Bubi, who was staying in the men's camp. Her stay here was shortened due to the Allies advance and the three surviving members of the family were taken by trains further into Germany. On the way, the guards deserted and many of the prisoners mistook this to be the liberation. However, the guards returned and fired upon those who had left the train, and ordered the others back onto the carriages. During the rest of the journey, Bitton-Jackson was able to keep her brother with herself and her mother. At one point, she spotted through the cracks in the carriage Red Cross trucks, and the soldiers informed them that the charity would be giving out food. The surviving inmates lined up close to the carriage entrance whereupon they were shot at by the SS. Bubi received a shot to the forehead, but survived. It was only after a week of traveling that the Americans discovered the trains full of dead, injured, and starving inmates.

After the liberation, Bitton-Jackson, her mother and brother stayed in Seeshaupt where she helped to nurse her brother and fellow inmates back to health.

== New York ==
After the war, she and her brother and mother returned to Šamorín, believing that her father would be waiting for them, only to discover that he was dead. Her brother then moved to New York on a visa from a school scholarship. Bitton-Jackson had the opportunity to go with her brother but chose to stay in Czechoslovakia with her mother. After the communist coup in February 1948, borders were sealed, but the two managed to leave Czechoslovakia illegally, from Bratislava to a refugee camp in Vienna, where they stayed for 8 months. They then moved to Germany, where in 1951 they finally got visas to go to America.

They traveled to America on a refugee boat, and Bitton-Jackson continued her education. She earned a B.A. from Brooklyn College in 1961 and then enrolled at New York University, where she received an MA and a Ph.D. in Hebrew Culture and Jewish History. She was a professor of history at City University of New York for 37 years.

== Israel ==
She married Dr. Leonard Jackson, whose first wife was the sister of Elie Wiesel, and in 1977, Bitton-Jackson moved to Israel, where she lived until her death. She continued teaching at CUNY for years thereafter, and made periodic trips to the U.S. for speaking engagements. In April 2009, Bitton-Jackson was invited to speak in Omaha, Nebraska, for Holocaust Remembrance Day at the Durham Museum, with videolinks to Pleasanton and at Millard West High School. She also spoke to members of the Strategic Air Command at Offutt AFB.

== Awards ==
Bitton-Jackson's memoir, Elli: Coming of Age in the Holocaust (1980) won the 1981 Christopher Award, as well as the Eleanor Roosevelt Humanitarian Award, and the Jewish Heritage Award. In 1997 Bitton-Jackson adapted Elli for a teenage audience, retitling the memoir I Have Lived a Thousand Years: Growing Up in the Holocaust. Her books have been translated into Hungarian, Slovak, German, French, Italian and Japanese.

== Publications ==
- Elli: Coming of Age in the Holocaust (1980)
- I Have Lived a Thousand Years: Growing Up in the Holocaust (1997)
- My Bridges of Hope: Six Long Years to Freedom After Auschwitz (1999)
- Hello, America: A Refugee's Journey from Auschwitz to the New World (2005)
- Saving What Remains: A Holocaust Survivor's Journey Home to Reclaim Her Ancestry (2009)
