= Eberlanzia (arachnid) =

Scientific classification
- Kingdom: Animalia
- Phylum: Arthropoda
- Subphylum: Chelicerata
- Class: Arachnida
- Order: Solifugae
- Family: Daesiidae
- Genus: Eberlanzia; Roewer, 1941

Type species
- Eberlanzia flava Roewer, 1941

Species
- 2, see text

Genus of camel spiders

Eberlanzia is a genus of daesiid camel spiders, first described by Carl Friedrich Roewer in 1941.

== Species ==
As of October 2022, the World Solifugae Catalog accepts the following two species:

- Eberlanzia benedicti Delle Cave & Simonetta, 1971 — Somalia
- Eberlanzia flava Roewer, 1941 — Namibia
