= Šamorin Roman Catholic Church =

- Somorjai Romai Katolikus templom
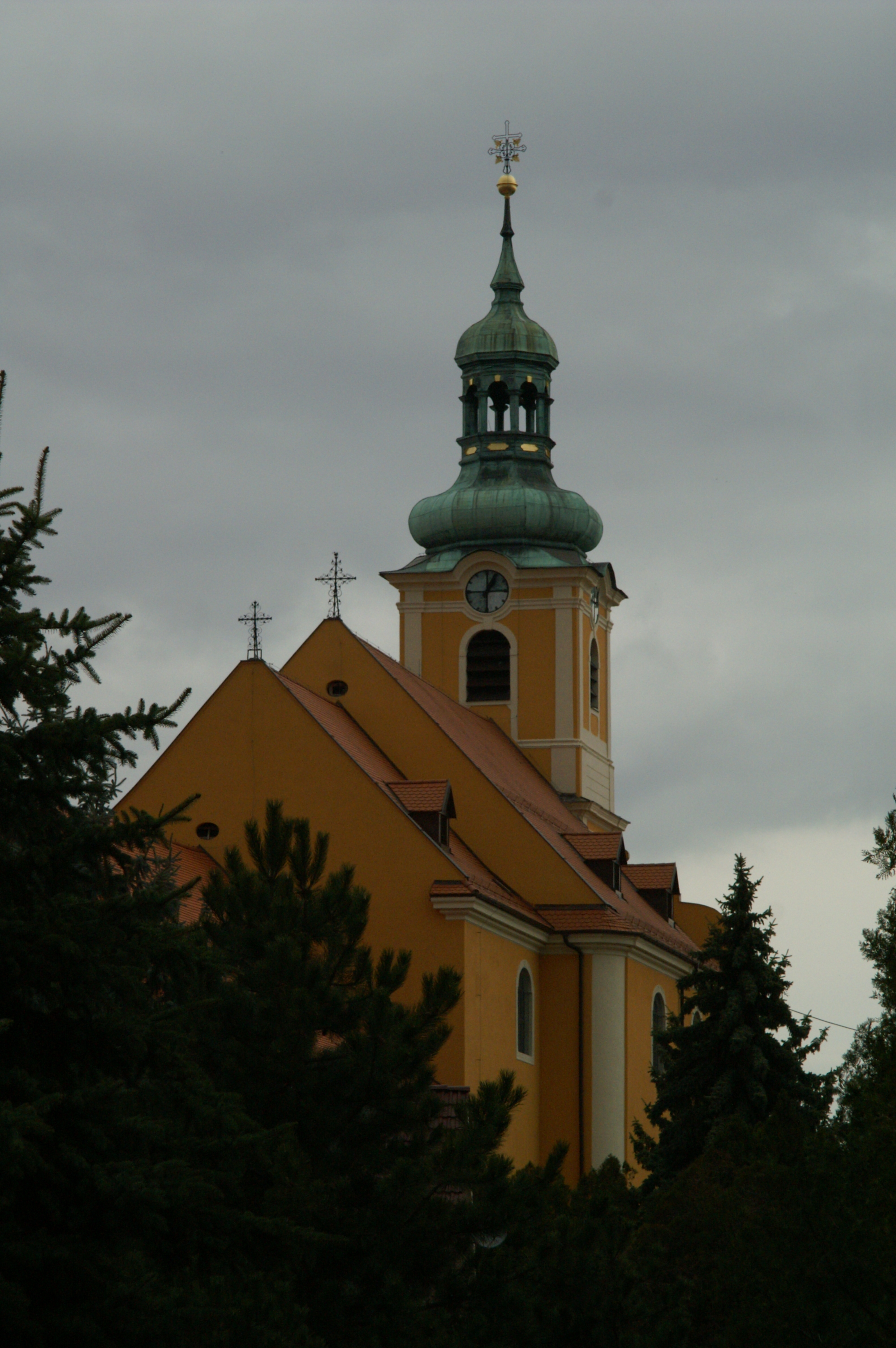
- A Roman Catholic church in Šamorín

- Location of Šamorín in the Trnava Region Šamorin Roman Catholic Church (Slovakia)
- 48°01′42″N 17°18′27″E
- Location: Dunajská Streda, Trnava
- Country: Slovakia
- Denomination: Roman Catholic
- Website: www.samorin.sk

The Šamorin Roman Catholic Church is a Roman Catholic church in the town of Šamorín in Slovakia.

== Geography ==
The church is located in the middle of town near all significant buildings.

== History ==
Roman - Catholic Church with Paulin's monastery was built in late-baroque style in 1778 by J. G. Altenburg. This church has got a single-nave hall with segmented breech of presbyter and barrel-vault with groins. Facade of the church is divided by pilasters. The portal with profiled chambranle has got thin pilasters with a volute on a sett. This sett is based on these pilasters and it is also finished by cut profiled cornice with a cross. The tower built into the pinnacle facade is hidden by a ball-shaped polygonal lantern. In the inside of the church are fresco paintings by Fr. Sigrist (1778). The interior is designed in late-baroque style and the interspace is solved in a particular way of uniformity. In the western side breech of sacrarium is stucco relief of Godfather.

The members of strictly catholic Palffy family, landlords of the town, were convinced to turn local Calvinists to the Catholic Church. The count in 1652 notified the city council, that he is about to build a monastery and that he would like to base the members of the friary of Saint Francis on his property in this area. The king Carl III. on 21 August 1720 accepted activities of Saint Francis' friary in Hungary, so it means the same for the Samorin town. Later on, these monks built, in 1778, their own monastery and church, which was the only church belonging to the Saint Frances' (Paulin's) friary in the Hungarian empire. In the school, which was based in the building of the monastery, German language was used for teaching in the second half of the 18th century.
