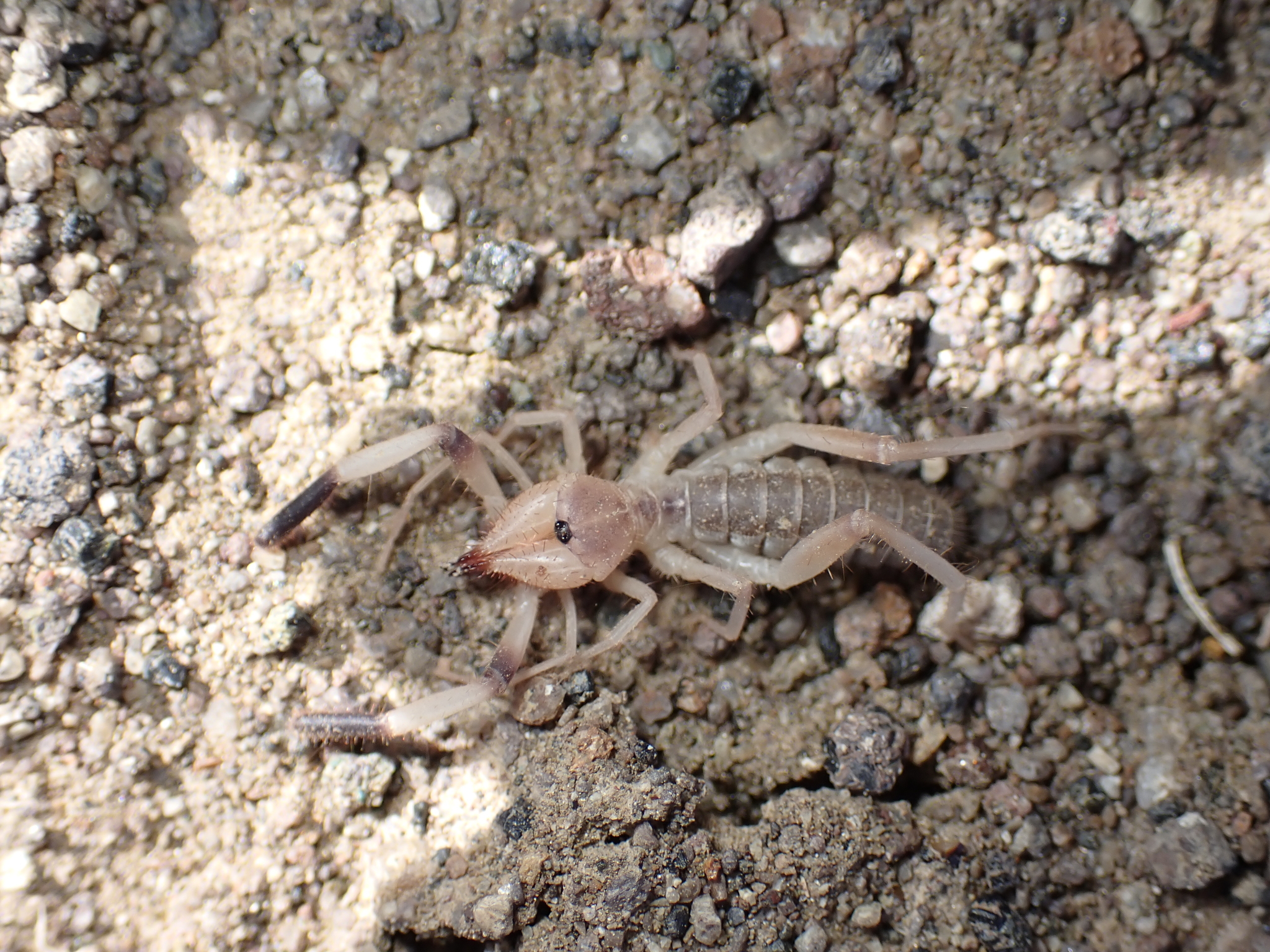
- Biton rossicus

Scientific classification
- Domain: Eukaryota
- Kingdom: Animalia
- Phylum: Arthropoda
- Subphylum: Chelicerata
- Class: Arachnida
- Order: Solifugae
- Family: Daesiidae
- Genus: Biton; Karsch, 1880

Type species
- Biton ehrenbergi Karsch, 1880

Species
- 68, see text

= Biton (arachnid) =

Genus of camel spiders

Biton is a genus of daesiid camel spiders, first described by Ferdinand Karsch in 1880.

== Species ==
As of October 2022, the World Solifugae Catalog accepts the following sixty-eight species:

- Biton adamanteus Lawrence, 1968 — Namibia, South Africa
- Biton arenicola Lawrence, 1966 — Namibia
- Biton bellulus (Pocock, 1902) — Egypt
- Biton bernardi (Pocock, 1900) — South Africa
- Biton betschuanicus (Kraepelin, 1908) — Botswana, South Africa
- Biton browni (Lawrence, 1965) — Namibia, South Africa
- Biton brunneus Roewer, 1933 — Morocco
- Biton brunnipes Pocock, 1896 — Ethiopia, Kenya, Somalia
- Biton cataractus Lawrence, 1968 — Namibia, South Africa
- Biton crassidens Lawrence, 1935 — South Africa
- Biton cursorius Roewer, 1933 — Togo
- Biton divaricatus Roewer, 1933 — Togo
- Biton ehrenbergi Karsch, 1880 — Cyprus, Egypt, Ethiopia, Greece, Israel, Italy (mainland), Saudi Arabia, Somalia, Sudan, Tunisia
- Biton fallax (Borelli, 1925) — Libya
- Biton fessanus Roewer, 1933 — Libya
- Biton fuscipes Pocock, 1897 — Ethiopia, Somalia
- Biton fuscus (Kraepelin, 1899) — Algeria
- Biton gaerdesi Roewer, 1954 — Namibia
- Biton gariesensis (Lawrence, 1931) — South Africa
- Biton haackei Lawrence, 1968 — South Africa
- Biton habereri (Kraepelin, 1929) — Chad
- Biton hottentottus (Kraepelin, 1899) — Namibia, South Africa
- Biton kolbei (Purcell, 1899) — South Africa, Zimbabwe
- Biton kraekolbei Wharton, 1981 — Namibia, South Africa
- Biton laminatus (Pocock, 1903) — Yemen
- Biton leipoldti (Purcell, 1899) — South Africa
- Biton lineatus (Pocock, 1902) — South Africa
- Biton lividus Simon, 1882 — Egypt, Eritrea, Sudan
- Biton longisetosus Lawrence, 1972 — South Africa
- Biton magnifrons (Birula, 1905) — Ethiopia, Israel
- Biton monodentatus Delle Cave, 1978 — Somalia
- Biton mossambicus Roewer, 1954 — Mozambique
- Biton namaqua (Kraepelin, 1899) — Namibia, South Africa
- Biton ovambicus (Lawrence, 1927) — Namibia
- Biton pallidus (Purcell, 1899) — South Africa
- Biton pearsoni (Hewitt, 1914) — Namibia, South Africa
- Biton persicus (Birula, 1905) — Iran
- Biton philbyi Lawrence, 1954 — Saudi Arabia
- Biton pimenteli Frade, 1940 — Angola
- Biton planirostris (Birula, 1941) — Yemen
- Biton ragazzii (Kraepelin, 1899) — Djibouti, Eritrea, Sudan
- Biton rhodesianus (Hewitt, 1914) — South Africa, Zimbabwe
- Biton roeweri (Lawrence, 1935) — Zimbabwe
- Biton rossicus (Birula, 1905) — Iran, Kazakhstan, Tajikistan, Turkmenistan, Uzbekistan
- Biton sabulosus (Pocock, 1903) — Saudi Arabia, Yemen
- Biton schelkovnikovi (Birula, 1936) — Armenia, Azerbaijan
- Biton schreineri (Purcell, 1903) — South Africa
- Biton schultzei (Kraepelin, 1908) — Botswana, South Africa
- Biton simoni (Kraepelin, 1899) — Djibouti, Somalia
- Biton striatus (Lawrence, 1928) — Namibia, South Africa
- Biton subulatus (Purcell, 1899) — South Africa
- Biton tarabulus Roewer, 1933 — Libya
- Biton tauricus Roewer, 1941 — Turkey
- Biton tenuifalcis Lawrence, 1962 — Namibia, South Africa
- Biton tigrinus Pocock, 1898 — Kenya
- Biton transvaalensis Lawrence, 1949 — South Africa
- Biton triseriatus Lawrence, 1955 — Namibia, South Africa
- Biton truncatidens Lawrence, 1954 — Saudi Arabia
- Biton tunetanus Simon, 1885 — Algeria, Israel, Libya, Tunisia
- Biton turkestanus (Roewer, 1933) — China
- Biton vachoni Lawrence, 1966 — Algeria
- Biton velox Simon, 1885 — Ethiopia, Israel, Italy, Kenya, Libya, Somalia, Tunisia
- Biton villiersi (Vachon, 1950) — Niger
- Biton villosus Roewer, 1933 — Ethiopia, Somalia
- Biton werneri Roewer, 1933 — Namibia
- Biton wicki (Birula, 1915) — Egypt, Ethiopia, Somalia, Sudan, Yemen
- Biton xerxes (Roewer, 1933) — Iran
- Biton zederbaueri (Werner, 1905) — Israel, Turkey
