= Yosef Bittón =

Chief Rabbi of Uruguay

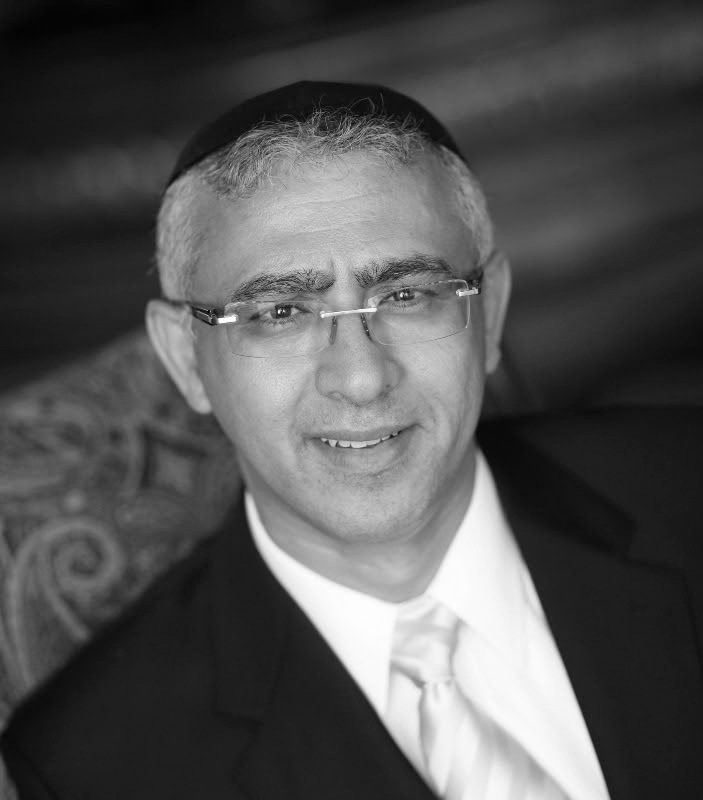
- Born: Argentina
- Education: Yeshiva University, Ben Gurion, Bar-Ilan and Emory
- Occupations: Rabbi, author
- Known for: Former Chief Rabbi of Uruguay
- Notable work: Awesome Creation, Bereshit

Rabbi Yosef Bittón is an Argentinian-born community rabbi and the former Chief Rabbi of Uruguay.

== Biography ==
=== Early life and education ===
Rabbi Yosef Bittón was born in Argentina to Argentine parents. His paternal grandparents came from Tetouan, Morocco, and his maternal grandparents were from Damascus, Syria

He began his academic studies at Yeshiva University and also studied at Bar-Ilan, where he got his first degree in the Hebrew language, Biblical studies, and Talmud. Bittón received his MA at the Hebrew University of Jerusalem and subsequently entered the direct-track doctoral program. He later attended Ben Gurion University in Beer Sheva and engaged in doctoral studies in the Department of Religion at Emory University in Atlanta, US.

Bittón received his rabbinic ordination from the Chief Rabbinate of Israel and his Dayanut ordination from Rabbi Ovadiah Yosef.

=== Rabbinical career ===
Rabbi Bittón served for more than 35 years as a community rabbi in Buenos Aires, Montevideo, and the United States.

In 1985, he served as Rabbi of Congregation Chalom. He then became the rabbi of the Agudat Dodim Community until 1996, both Sephardic congregations in Buenos Aires, Argentina. In 1996, Bittón organized a community immigration project (Aliyá) with the vice-mayor of the city of Dimona, Israel, Albert Asaf. Rabbi Bittón and his family were joined by 40 others, the majority belonging to the Agudat Dodim community of Flores, Buenos Aires. In 1998, he returned to South America as Chief Rabbi of Uruguay, where he was spiritual leader to over 15,000 families for four years.

In 2004, he moved to New York, where he lives with his wife Coty, children, and grandchildren. He was the rabbi of Congregation Shaare Rachamim in Great Neck, and in 2013 became rabbi of Congregation Ohel David and Shlomo in Brooklyn. He is currently the rabbi of the Congregation Shaare Rachamim, belonging to the United Mashadi Jewish Community of America (UMJCA), in Great Neck, New York. He is also the Director of Judaic Studies of the UMJCA Talmud Torah Program and the Judaic Studies Principal of MESA.

== Published works ==
=== Books ===
Bittón's first book was A Talmudic analysis of the story of Cinderella. His best-known book is Awesome creation, an analysis of the first three verses of Genesis, Genesis Chapter 1, verses 1–3. This book has been translated into Spanish and Portuguese, and has received coverage in multiple sources.

In 2018, he published Forgotten Giants, the story of 26 Sephardic rabbis, before and after the expulsion from Spain. He announced a second volume of the book in 2025, which details the lives of 13 additional rabbis.

He also completed a book on creation called Dinosaurs in the Bible, on Genesis Chapter 1, Verses 20–22. The book has been published in Portuguese and soon to be published in English and Spanish.

=== Daily newsletter ===
The daily email of his website, Halakha of the Day (English and Spanish), reaches 48,000 subscribers.
