= Jean-Luc Bitton =

French writer

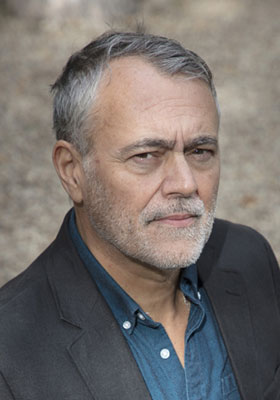
Bitton in 2019

Jean-Luc Bitton (born in 1959 in Lyon, France) is a writer and journalist. Together with Raymond Cousse, he wrote Emmanuel Bove : La Vie Comme une Ombre, a biography of the writer Emmanuel Bove. He also participated in the creation of the Bove segment of the television series A Century of Writers (1997) and has created a website devoted entirely to Bove. Bitton's 2019 biography of French poet Jacques Rigaut won Le Point magazine's biography prize in 2020.

He has published articles in the journals Jungle, Perpendicular, The Series, the Nouvelle Revue Française and Rue Saint Ambrose.

== Selected works ==
- Emmanuel Bove : La Vie Comme une Ombre, with Raymond Cousse. Preface by Peter Handke. Castor Astral (1994) ISBN 2-8592-0226-9
- Nos Amours. Un Siècle de Lettres d'Amour, Flammarion (2001) ISBN 2-08-067871-X
- La Mer de la Tranquillité: Images, with Dolorès Marat, Les Petits Matins (2005) ISBN 2-9158791-1-7
- Jacques Rigaut, le suicidé magnifique, Preface by Annie Le Brun, Gallimard (2019) ISBN 9782072713224
