= Ori Biton =

Israeli professional footballer

Ori Biton אורי ביטון
Personal information
- Date of birth: 2 October 1987 (age 39)
- Place of birth: Israel
- Position: Midfielder

Youth career
- Maccabi Tel Aviv

Senior career*
Years	Team	Apps	(Gls)
2007	Maccabi Tel Aviv		
2007–2008	→ Hapoel Ra'anana (loan)	28	(1)
2009–2010	→ Hapoel Marmorek (loan)		

International career
2005	Israel U18	3	(0)
Medal record
Representing Israel
Football
Maccabiah Games
Gold medal – first place	2005 Maccabiah	Football
- * Club domestic league appearances and goals as of 20:17, 5 April 2009 (UTC)

Ori Biton (Hebrew: אורי ביטון; born 2 October 1987) is an Israeli professional footballer who plays for Maccabi Tel Aviv.

== Honours ==
Maccabi Tel Aviv

- Israeli Noar Leumit League: 2004–05
