= Ammotrechelis =

Scientific classification
- Domain: Eukaryota
- Kingdom: Animalia
- Phylum: Arthropoda
- Subphylum: Chelicerata
- Class: Arachnida
- Order: Solifugae
- Family: Daesiidae
- Genus: Ammotrechelis; Roewer, 1934
- Species: A. goetschi

Binomial name
- Ammotrechelis goetschi Roewer, 1934

Genus of camel spiders

Ammotrechelis is a monotypic genus of daesiid camel spiders, first described by Carl Friedrich Roewer in 1934. Its single species, Ammotrechelis goetschi is distributed in Chile.
