= Dolorès Marat =

French photographer

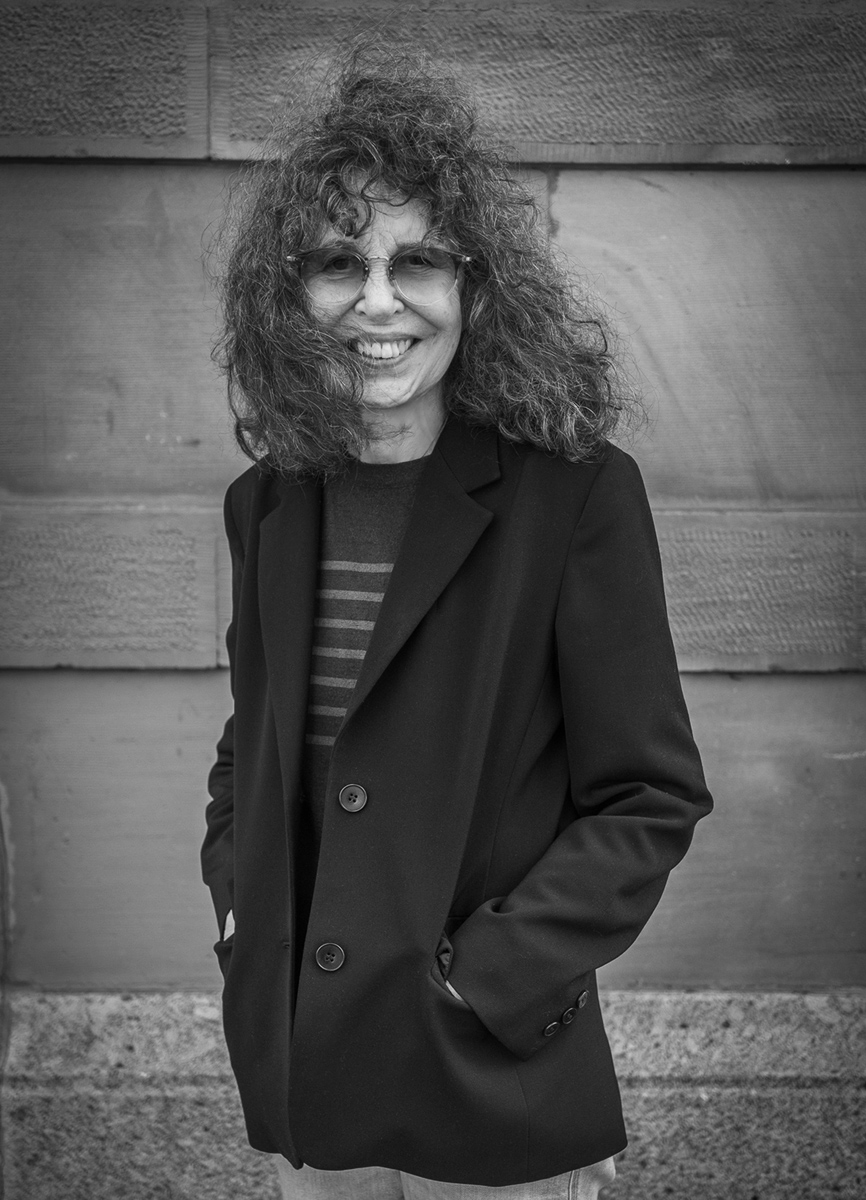
Marat in 2021

Dolorès Marat (born 1944) is a French photographer.

== Life and work ==
Marat first worked as a seamstress, then as an apprentice to a local photographer, a laboratory assistant, a salesperson in a camera shop, a photographers' printer, a lab assistant at L'Oréal magazine Votre Beauté, and a studio photographer, before finally working as an independent photographer from 1984. She began her personal work in the mid-1990s. She uses colour slide film and her prints are made using the Fresson process.

== Publications ==
- Éclipse. Paris: Contrejour, 1990.
- Rives. Paris: Marval, 1995.
- Carven : half a century of elegance, Dominique Paulvé. Paris: Gründ, 1995. ISBN 2-7000-2007-3.
- Boulevard Maritime. With Frédéric H. Fajardie. Point du jour, 2000.
- Labyrinthe. Point du jour and Dewi Lewis, 2001.
- New-York USA. With Patrick Roegiers. Paris: Marval, 2002.
- Illusion. With Marie Darrieussecq. Éditions Filigranes, 2003.
- Near Life Experience. Paris: Hors Commerce, 2003. Curated by Angelin Preljocaj, edited and with text by Éric Reinhardt.
- La mer by la tranquillité. Petits Matins, 2005. Journal by Jean-Luc Bitton, illustrated with photographs by Marat.
- Paris, correspondances. Avignon, Pionnière, 2015. With an essay by Arlette Farge.
- Palmyre et autres Orients. Avignon, Pionnière, 2016. With an essay by Dominique Janvier.
- Mezzo voce. Paris: Fario, 2018 ISBN 9791091902472. With an essay by Lionel Bourg.
- Lune rouge et autres animaux familiers Paris: Fario, 2021. ISBN 979-10-91902-74-8. With an essay by Vincent Pélissier.
- Dolorès Marat. Photo Poche. Arles: Actes Sud, 2023. ISBN 978-2-330-17886-4. With an introduction by Éric Reinhardt.

== Exhibitions ==
- Dolorès Marat, Open Eye Gallery, Liverpool, UK, 2003
- Sirocco, Centre national des arts plastiques, Paris, May–June 2013
- Festival des Promenades Photographiques, Vendôme, France, 2014
- Chromatic Disruption, Rencontres d'Arles, Arles, France, 2023
