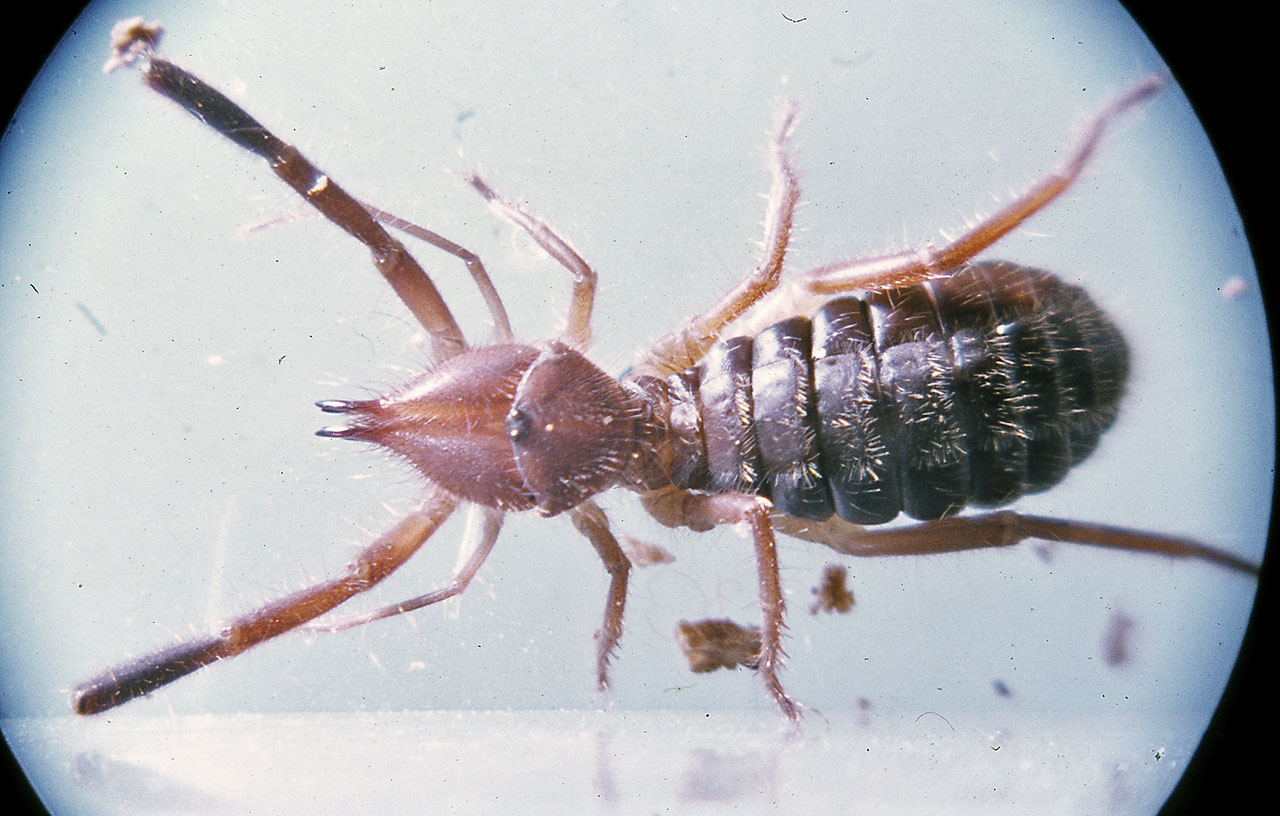
- Gluvia dorsalis

Scientific classification
- Kingdom: Animalia
- Phylum: Arthropoda
- Subphylum: Chelicerata
- Class: Arachnida
- Order: Solifugae
- Family: Daesiidae; Kraepelin, 1899

= Daesiidae =

Daesiidae Temporal range: Eocene–recent

Family of spider-like animals

Daesiidae is a family of solifugids, which are widespread in Africa and the Middle East. Members of the family are also present in India, Italy, South America, the Balkans, and the single species Gluvia dorsalis in the Iberian Peninsula. A single fossil species is known from Eocene Baltic amber.

== Genera ==
As of September 2022, the World Solifugae Catalog accepts the following twenty-nine genera:

- Ammotrechelis Roewer, 1934
- Biton Karsch, 1880
- Bitonota Roewer, 1933
- Bitonupa Roewer, 1933
- Blossia Simon, 1880
- Blossiana Roewer, 1933
- Ceratobiton Delle Cave & Simonetta, 1971
- Daesiola Roewer, 1933
- Eberlanzia Roewer, 1941
- Gluvia C.L. Koch, 1842
- Gluviella Caporiacco, 1948
- Gluviola Roewer, 1933
- Gluviopsida Roewer, 1933
- Gluviopsilla Roewer, 1933
- Gluviopsis Kraepelin, 1899
- Gluviopsona Roewer, 1933
- Gnosippus Karsch, 1880
- Haarlovina Lawrence, 1956
- Hemiblossia Kraepelin, 1899
- Hemiblossiola Roewer, 1933
- Hodeidania Roewer, 1933
- Mumaella Harvey, 2002
- Namibesia Lawrence, 1962
- Syndaesia Maury, 1980
- Tarabulida Roewer, 1933
- Triditarsula Roewer, 1933
- Triditarsus Roewer, 1933
- Valdesia Maury, 1981
- †Palaeoblossia Dunlop, Wunderlich & Poinar, 2004
