= Thomas Bytton =

Dean of Wells

Thomas Bytton was the Dean of Wells between 1284 and 1292.
