= Hemiptera in the 10th edition of Systema Naturae =

In the 10th edition of Systema Naturae, Carl Linnaeus classified the arthropods, including insects, arachnids and crustaceans, among his class "Insecta". True bugs and thrips were brought together under the name Hemiptera.

== Cicada (cicadas) ==
- Cicada laternaria – Fulgora lanternaria
- Cicada candelaria – Pyrops candelarius
- Cicada phosphorea – Raphirhinus phosphoreus
- Cicada noctivida – Mitrops noctivida
- Cicada lucernaria – Homalodisca lucernaria
- Cicada foliata – Membracis foliata
- Cicada fronditia – Stegaspis fronditia
- Cicada squamigera – Enchenopa squamigera
- Cicada crux – Hemikyptha crux
- Cicada cornuta – Centrotus cornutus
- Cicada aurita – Ledra aurita
- Cicada ciliaris – Hamaza ciliaris
- Cicada quadrifasciata – Cardioscarta quadrifasciata
- Cicada bifasciata – Planaphrodes bifasciata
- Cicada fornicata – Paranistria fornicata
- Cicada stridula – Platypleura stridula
- Cicada orni
- Cicada repanda – Pycna repanda
- Cicada reticulata – Aetalion reticulatum
- Cicada tibicen – Tibicen tibicen
- Cicada septendecim – Magicicada septendecim, periodical cicada
- Cicada violacea – Pinheya violacea
- Cicada coleoptrata – Lepyronia coleoptrata
- Cicada spumaria, Cicada leucophthalma, Cicada leucocephala, Cicada lateralis, Cicada flava – Philaenus spumarius
- Cicada nervosa – Cixius nervosus
- Cicada albifrons – Anoscopus albifrons
- Cicada striata – Psammotettix striatus
- Cicada lineata – Neophilaenus lineatus
- Cicada interrupta – Evacanthus interruptus
- Cicada vittata – Eupteryx vittata
- Cicada aptera – Halticus apterus
- Cicada phalaenoides – Poekilloptera phalaenoides
- Cicada lanata – Lystra lanata
- Cicada rubra – Sphenorhina rubra
- Cicada viridis – Cicadella viridis
- Cicada aurata – Eupteryx aurata
- Cicada ulmi – Ribautiana ulmi
- Cicada rosae – Edwardsiana rosae

== Notonecta (backswimmers) ==
- Notonecta glauca
- Notonecta striata – Sigara striata
- Notonecta minutissima – Micronecta minutissima

== Nepa (water scorpions) ==
- Nepa grandis - Lethocerus grandis
- Nepa rubra - Nepa cinerea
- Nepa fusca - Laccotrephes brachialis
- Nepa atra
- Nepa cinerea
- Nepa cimicoides - Ilyocoris cimicoides
- Nepa linearis – Ranatra linearis

== Cimex (shield bugs & bedbugs) ==
- Cimex lectularius – bedbug
- Cimex stockerus – Chrysocoris stockerus
- Cimex scarabaeoides – Thyreocoris scarabaeoides
- Cimex maurus – Eurygaster maura
- Cimex lineatus – Graphosoma lineatum
- Cimex arabs – Edessa arabs
- Cimex serratus – Edessa serrata
- Cimex stolidus – Edessa stolida
- Cimex histrio, Cimex peregrinator – Dinocoris histrio
- Cimex littoralis – Salda littoralis
- Cimex rugosus – Nabis rugosus
- Cimex clavicornis – Copium clavicorne
- Cimex corticalis – Aradus corticalis
- Cimex betulae – Aradus betulae
- Cimex erosus – Phymata erosa
- Cimex filicis – Monalocoris filicis
- Cimex cardui – Tingis cardui
- Cimex bidens – Picromerus bidens
- Cimex rufipes – Pentatoma rufipes
- Cimex marginatus – Coreus marginatus
- Cimex bipustulatus – Leptoscelis bipustulatus
- Cimex ypsilon – Mormidea ypsilon
- Cimex punctatus – Rhacognathus punctatus
- Cimex haemorrhoidalis – Acanthosoma haemorrhoidale
- Cimex valgus – Elasmopoda valga
- Cimex quadrispinosus – Ricolla quadrispinosa
- Cimex acantharis – Heza acantharis
- Cimex viridulus – Nezara viridula, southern green stink bug
- Cimex bipunctatus – Stagonomus bipunctatus
- Cimex sexpunctatus – Hyrmine sexpunctata
- Cimex griseus – Elasmucha grisea
- Cimex interstinctus – Elasmostethus interstinctus
- Cimex baccarum – Dolycoris baccarum
- Cimex dumosus – Jalla dumosa
- Cimex variolosus – Dinocoris variolosus
- Cimex juniperinus – Chlorochroa juniperina
- Cimex caeruleus – Zicrona caerulea
- Cimex lineola – Largus lineola
- Cimex oleraceus – Eurydema oleracea
- Cimex biguttatus – Adomerus biguttatus
- Cimex bicolor – Tritomegas bicolor
- Cimex ornatus – Eurydema ornata
- Cimex ruber – Deraeocoris ruber
- Cimex acuminatus – Aelia acuminata
- Cimex leucocephalus – Strongylocoris leucocephalus
- Cimex minutus – Orius minutus
- Cimex personatus – Reduvius personatus
- Cimex annulatus – Rhynocoris annulatus
- Cimex ater – Capsus ater
- Cimex gothicus – Capsodes gothicus
- Cimex indus – Nematopus indus
- Cimex hyoscyami – Corizus hyoscyami
- Cimex equestris – Lygaeus equestris
- Cimex apterus – Pyrrhocoris apterus
- Cimex aegyptius – Scantius aegyptius
- Cimex andreae – Dysdercus andreae
- Cimex kalmii, Cimex umbratilis – Orthops kalmii
- Cimex pratensis – Lygus pratensis
- Cimex campestris – Orthops campestris
- Cimex crassicornis – Stictopleurus crassicornis
- Cimex saltatorius – Saldula saltatoria
- Cimex arenarius – Trapezonotus arenarius
- Cimex pini – Rhyparochromus pini
- Cimex rolandri – Aphanus rolandri
- Cimex nigripes – Calliclopius nigripes
- Cimex laevigatus – Stenodema laevigatum
- Cimex dolabratus – Leptopterna dolabrata
- Cimex striatus – Miris striatus
- Cimex erraticus – Notostira erratica
- Cimex ferus – Nabis ferus
- Cimex populi – Phytocoris populi
- Cimex ulmi – Phytocoris ulmi
- Cimex sylvestris – Ligyrocoris sylvestris
- Cimex bimaculatus – Closterotomus fulvomaculatus
- Cimex calcaratus – Alydus calcaratus
- Cimex abietis – Eremocoris abietis
- Cimex kermesinus – Ugnius kermesinus
- Cimex lacustris – Gerris lacustris, common water strider
- Cimex stagnorum – Hydrometra stagnorum
- Cimex vagabundus – Empicoris vagabundus
- Cimex tipularius – Neides tipularius
- Cimex coryli, Cimex mutabilis – Phylus coryli

== Aphis (aphids) ==
- Aphis ribis – Cryptomyzus ribis
- Aphis ulmi – Tetraneura ulmi
- Aphis pastinacae – Cavariella pastinacae
- Aphis sambuci
- Aphis rumicis
- Aphis lychnidis – Brachycaudus lychnidis
- Aphis padi – Rhopalosiphum padi
- Aphis rosae – Macrosiphum rosae rose aphid
- Aphis tiliae – Eucallipterus tiliae
- Aphis brassicae – Brevicoryne brassicae, cabbage aphid
- Aphis craccae
- Aphis lactucae – Hyperomyzus lactucae
- Aphis cirsii – Uroleucon cirsii
- Aphis cardui – Brachycaudus cardui
- Aphis tanaceti – Uroleucon tanaceti
- Aphis absinthii – Macrosiphoniella absinthii
- Aphis jaceae – Uroleucon jaceae
- Aphis betulae – Glyphina betulae
- Aphis roboris – Lachnus roboris
- Aphis quercus – Stomaphis quercus
- Aphis pini – Cinara pini
- Aphis salicis – Pterocomma salicis
- Aphis populi – Pachypappa populi
- Aphis bursaria – Pemphigus bursarius
- Aphis urticae – Orthezia urticae

== Chermes (woolly aphids) ==
- Chermes graminis - nomen dubium
- Chermes ulmi - Eriosoma ulmi
- Chermes cerastii - Trioza cerastii
- Chermes pyri - Cacopsylla pyri
- Chermes buxi - Psylla buxi
- Chermes urticae - Trioza urticae
- Chermes betulae - Psylla betulae
- Chermes alni - Psylla alni
- Chermes quercus - nomen dubium
- Chermes abietis - Adelges abietis
- Chermes salicis - nomen dubium
- Chermes fraxini - Psyllopsis fraxini
- Chermes aceris - Rhinocola aceris
- Chermes ficus- Homotoma ficus

== Coccus (scale insects) ==
(Note: The current names of all Linnaeus' Coccus species are taken from Gertsson (2008))

- Coccus hesperidum
- Coccus aonidum – Chrysomphalus aonidum
- Coccus quercus – Kermes quercus
- Coccus ilicis – Kermes ilicis
- Coccus betulae, Coccus carpini, Coccus oxyacanthae & Coccus vitis – Pulvinaria vitis
- Coccus ulmi – Lepidosaphes ulmi
- Coccus coryli & Coccus tiliae – Eulecanium tiliae
- Coccus rusci – Ceroplastes rusci
- Coccus salicis – Chionaspis salicis
- Coccus polonicus, Coccus pilosellae – Polish cochineal (Porphyrophora polonica)
- Coccus phalaridis – [nomen dubium]
- Coccus cacti – Protortonia cacti

== Thrips (thrips) ==
- Thrips physapus
- Thrips minutissima – Thrips minutissimus
- Thrips juniperina – Thrips juniperinus
- Thrips fasciata – Aeolothrips fasciatus
