= List of Tingis species =

This is a list of 137 species in the genus Tingis.

== Tingis species ==
- Tingis abundans Drake and Hambleton, 1945
- Tingis acris Drake, 1947
- Tingis aegyptiaca Priesner, 1951
- Tingis aemula Drake, 1947
- Tingis aetheria Drake and Ruhoff, 1960
- Tingis afemeljanovi Golub, 2006
- Tingis afrana Duarte Rodrigues, 1982
- Tingis agrana Drake and Livingstone, 1964
- Tingis ajugarum (Frey-Gessner, 1872)
- Tingis alberensis Péricart, 1979
- Tingis altaica Golub, 1977
- Tingis americana Drake, 1922
- Tingis ampliata (Herrich-Schaeffer, 1838)
- Tingis amplicosta (Montandon, 1897)
- Tingis angustata (Herrich-Schaeffer, 1838)
- Tingis auriculata (Costa, 1847)
- Tingis ballotae Seidenstücker, 1972
- Tingis beesoni Drake, 1928
- Tingis beieri Drake, 1935
- Tingis bianchii Golub, 1977
- Tingis biseriata (Horváth, 1902)
- Tingis bodenheimeri Lindberg, 1930
- Tingis brevicornis (Horváth, 1902)
- Tingis bucharica Baehr, 1983
- Tingis buddleiae Drake, 1930
- Tingis canariensis Péricart, 1982
- Tingis capillata Kiritshenko, 1914
- Tingis cappadocica Horváth, 1906
- Tingis cardui (Linnaeus, 1758)
- Tingis caucasia (Jakovlev, 1880)
- Tingis caucasica (Jakovlev, 1880)
- Tingis chazeaui Guilbert, 1997
- Tingis christianriegeri Pagola-Carte and Günther, 2014
- Tingis ciliaris (Puton, 1879)
- Tingis colombiana Drake, 1929
- Tingis comosa (Takeya, 1931)
- Tingis consaepta Drake and Poor, 1939
- Tingis coomani Drake, 1947
- Tingis cornigera Golub and Akramovskaja, 1975
- Tingis corumbiana Drake, 1926
- Tingis crispata (Herrich-Schaeffer, 1838)
- Tingis curvipilis Golub, 1977
- Tingis demissa Horváth, 1906
- Tingis denudata Horváth, 1906
- Tingis deserta Qi and Nonnaizab, 1995
- Tingis deserticola Horváth, 1906
- Tingis drakei Hacker, 1929
- Tingis elongata (Fieber, 1861)
- Tingis emeljanovi Golub, 1977
- Tingis florissantensis Cockerell, 1914
- Tingis foleyi Bergevin, 1929
- Tingis fuentei Horváth, 1906
- Tingis gamboana Drake and Hambleton, 1945
- Tingis geniculata (Fieber, 1844)
- Tingis granadensis Horváth, 1906
- Tingis grisea Germar, 1835
- Tingis griseola (Puton, 1879)
- Tingis hackeri Drake, 1947
- Tingis heissi Golub, 2006
- Tingis hellenica (Puton, 1877)
- Tingis helvina (Jakovlev, 1876)
- Tingis heterotricha Golub, 1982
- Tingis hurdae Drake, 1947
- Tingis impensa Drake, 1947
- Tingis insularis (Horváth, 1902)
- Tingis irregularis (Montrouzier, 1861)
- Tingis juvenca (Horváth, 1902)
- Tingis kerzhneri Golub, 2006
- Tingis kirinana Drake, 1948
- Tingis laetabilis (Horváth, 1903)
- Tingis lanigera (Puton, 1886)
- Tingis lasiocera Matsumura, 1907
- Tingis latus Guilbert, 2002
- Tingis leptochila Horváth, 1906
- Tingis linnavuorii Péricart, 1985
- Tingis liturata (Fieber, 1844)
- Tingis longicurvipilis Nonnaizab, 1988
- Tingis lusitanica Duarte Rodrigues, 1978
- Tingis maculata (Herrich-Schaeffer, 1838)
- Tingis maderensis (Reuter, 1890)
- Tingis marrubii Vallot, 1829
- Tingis matsumurai Takeya, 1962
- Tingis mesasiatica Golub, 1978
- Tingis miyamotoi Lee, 1976
- Tingis muiri Drake, 1947
- Tingis neotropicalis Monte, 1940
- Tingis nigra Qi and Nonnaizab, 1989
- Tingis nyogana Drake, 1955
- Tingis obscura Heer, 1853
- Tingis oliveirae Drake & Hambleton, 1938
- Tingis oliveirai Drake and Hambleton, 1938
- Tingis ottomana Péricart and Önder, 1982
- Tingis pallidula Stusák and Stehlík, 1979
- Tingis paranana Drake, 1954
- Tingis parvoroe Guilbert, 1999
- Tingis pauperata (Puton, 1879)
- Tingis perkensi Drake, 1947
- Tingis pilosa Hummel, 1825
- Tingis platynota Golub, 1977
- Tingis premnae Livingstone and Jeyanthibai, 1994
- Tingis pusilla (Jakovlev, 1874)
- Tingis ragusana (Fieber, 1861)
- Tingis renovata Golub, 1977
- Tingis reticulata Herrich-Schaeffer, 1835
- Tingis reuteri Horváth, 1906
- Tingis ribesi Golub and Linnavuori, 2011
- Tingis riegeri Golub, 2014
- Tingis robusta Golub, 1977
- Tingis rotundicollis (Jakovlev, 1883)
- Tingis rotundipennis Horváth, 1911
- Tingis saueri Drake and Hambleton, 1939
- Tingis scutigerula Golub, 1977
- Tingis seidenstueckeri Péricart, 1982
- Tingis shaowuana Drake and Maa, 1953
- Tingis sideritis Stusák, 1973
- Tingis silvacata Drake, 1926
- Tingis similis (Douglas and Scott, 1869)
- Tingis sinuaticollis (Jakovlev, 1883)
- Tingis stachydis (Fieber, 1844)
- Tingis stepposa Golub, 1977
- Tingis strictula (Puton, 1878)
- Tingis stupidula Horváth, 1906
- Tingis suavis (Horváth, 1902)
- Tingis synuri Takeya, 1962
- Tingis tecomae Monte, 1940
- Tingis temperei Péricart, 1979
- Tingis teretis Drake, 1947
- Tingis tonkinana Drake, 1947
- Tingis torpida (Horváth, 1902)
- Tingis toxopeusi Drake, 1960
- Tingis trichonota (Puton, 1874)
- Tingis triseriata Golub, 1982
- Tingis valida (Puton, 1878)
- Tingis veteris Drake, 1942
- Tingis waui Guilbert, 2006
- Tingis yasumatsui Lee, 1967
- Tingis zhadiana Golub, 1978
