= Tingis (disambiguation) =

Tingis, or Tingi, was an ancient Roman colony near present-day Tangier, Morocco.

Tingis may also refer to:

- Tangier, Morocco (Latin name during the Roman Empire)
- Tingis (bug), a genus of lace bugs
