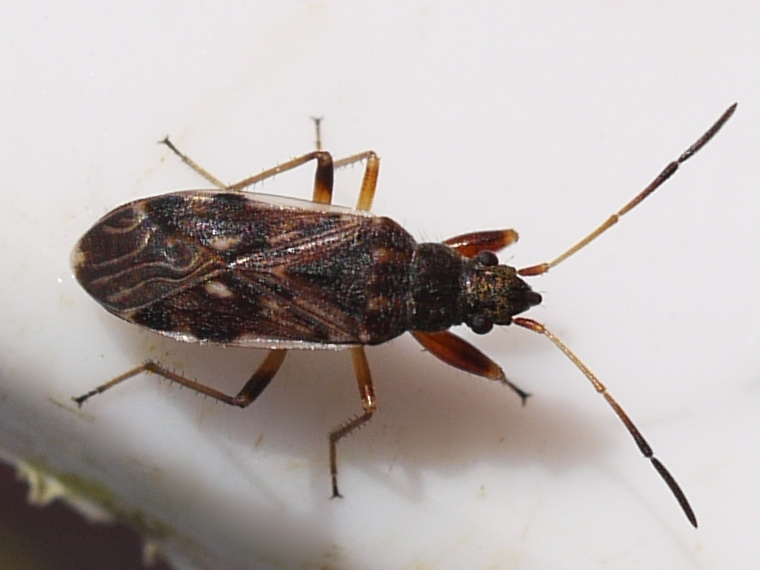
- Ligyrocoris diffusus, Wisconsin

Scientific classification
- Kingdom: Animalia
- Phylum: Arthropoda
- Clade: Pancrustacea
- Class: Insecta
- Order: Hemiptera
- Suborder: Heteroptera
- Family: Rhyparochromidae
- Subfamily: Rhyparochrominae
- Tribe: Myodochini
- Genus: Ligyrocoris; Stål, 1872

= Ligyrocoris =

Genus of true bugs

Ligyrocoris is a genus of dirt-colored seed bugs in the family Rhyparochromidae. There are about 13 described species in Ligyrocoris, found in the Northern hemisphere.

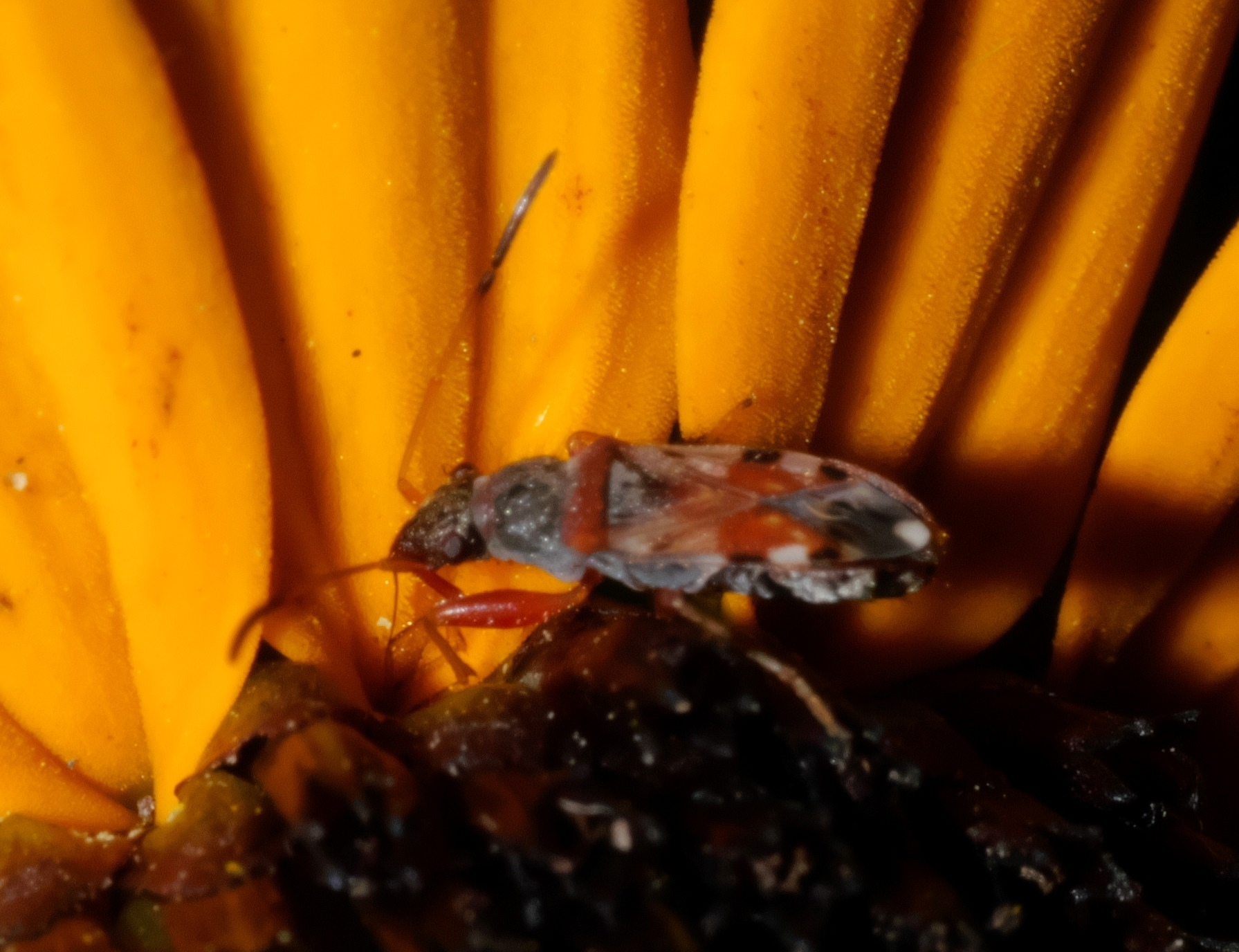
Ligyrocoris barberi, Oklahoma

== Species ==
These 13 species belong to the genus Ligyrocoris:

- Ligyrocoris balteatus Stal, 1874
- Ligyrocoris barberi Sweet, 1986
- Ligyrocoris caricis Sweet, 1963
- Ligyrocoris delitus Distant, 1893
- Ligyrocoris depictus Barber, 1921
- Ligyrocoris diffusus Uhler, 1871
- Ligyrocoris latimarginatus Barber, 1921
- Ligyrocoris litigiosus (Stal, 1862)
- Ligyrocoris obscurus Barber, 1921
- Ligyrocoris occultus Barber, 1953
- Ligyrocoris slossoni Barber, 1914
- Ligyrocoris sylvestris Linnaeus, 1758
- † Ligyrocoris exsuctus Scudder, 1890
