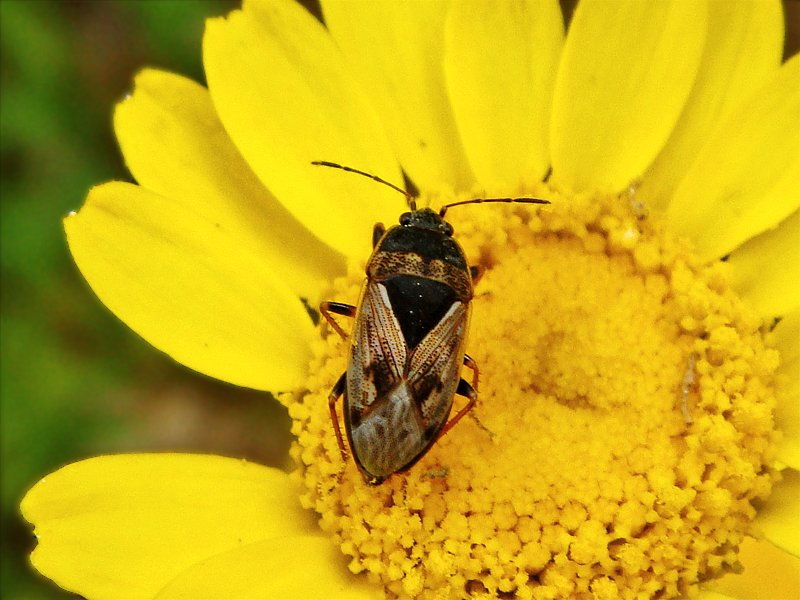
- Trapezonotus arenarius

Scientific classification
- Kingdom: Animalia
- Phylum: Arthropoda
- Class: Insecta
- Order: Hemiptera
- Suborder: Heteroptera
- Family: Rhyparochromidae
- Tribe: Gonianotini
- Genus: Trapezonotus; Fieber, 1860

= Trapezonotus =

Genus of true bugs

Trapezonotus is a genus of dirt-colored seed bugs in the family Rhyparochromidae. There are about 19 described species in Trapezonotus.

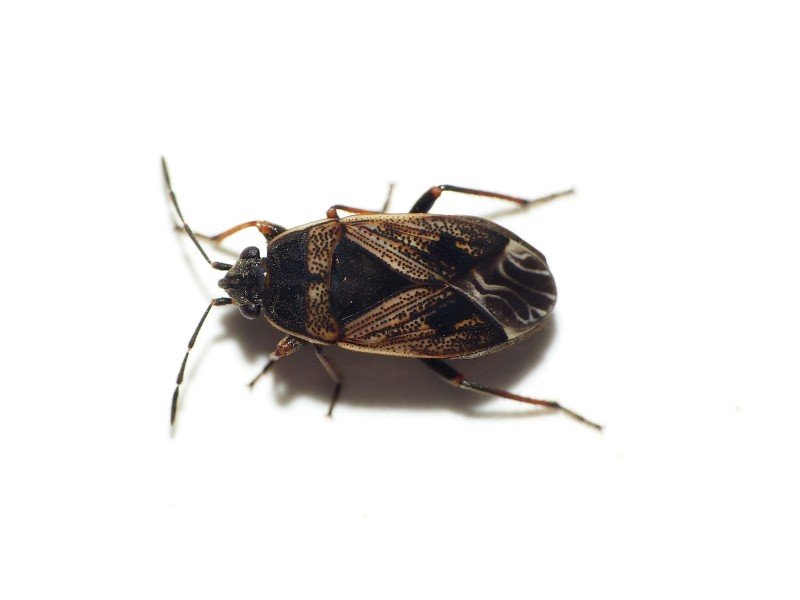
Trapezonotus dispar

== Species ==
These 19 species belong to the genus Trapezonotus:

- Trapezonotus aeneiventris Kiritshenko, 1931
- Trapezonotus alticolus Zheng & Zou, 1981
- Trapezonotus anorus (Flor, 1860)
- Trapezonotus arenarius Linnaeus, 1758
- Trapezonotus compar Seidenstucker, 1971
- Trapezonotus derivatus Barber, 1918
- Trapezonotus desertus Seidenstucker, 1951
- Trapezonotus dispar Stal, 1872
- Trapezonotus diversus Barber, 1918
- Trapezonotus inglorius Vinokurov, 1990
- Trapezonotus lattini Scudder, 2008
- Trapezonotus singularis Kiritshenko & Scudder, 1969
- Trapezonotus subtilis Jakovlev, 1889
- Trapezonotus ullrichi (Fieber, 1837)
- Trapezonotus vandykei Van Duzee, 1937
- † Trapezonotus exterminatus Scudder, 1890
- † Trapezonotus riguus Statz & Wagner, 1950
- † Trapezonotus striatus Statz & Wagner, 1950
- † Trapezonotus stygialis Scudder, 1890
