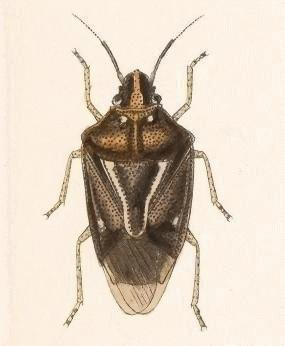

Scientific classification
- Kingdom: Animalia
- Phylum: Arthropoda
- Clade: Pancrustacea
- Class: Insecta
- Order: Hemiptera
- Suborder: Heteroptera
- Family: Pentatomidae
- Tribe: Pentatomini
- Genus: Mormidea
- Species: M. pictiventris

Binomial name
- Mormidea pictiventris Stål, 1862

= Mormidea pictiventris =

Species of true bug

Mormidea pictiventris is a species of stink bug in the family Pentatomidae. It is found in Central America, North America, and South America.
