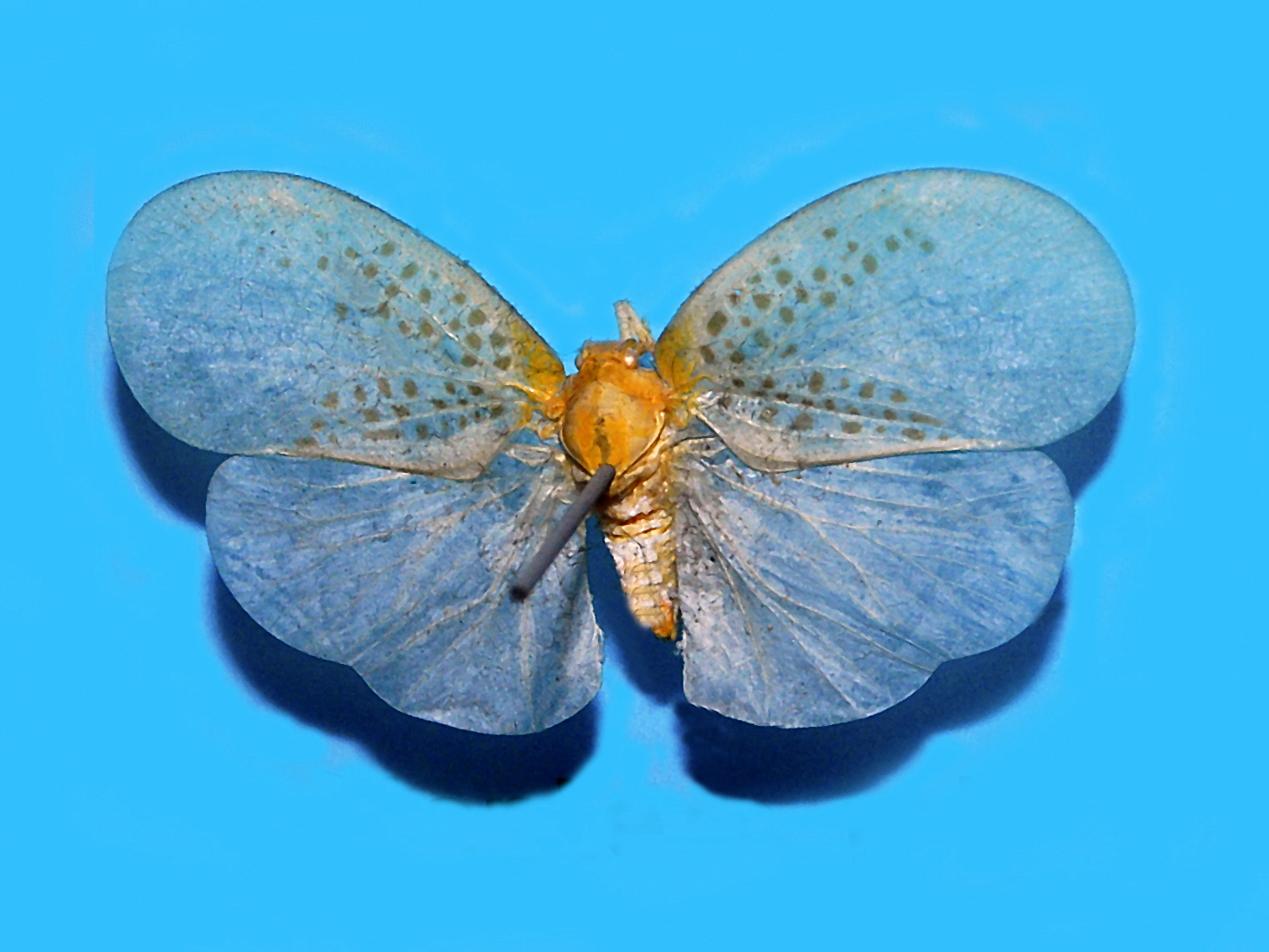
- Poekilloptera minor

Scientific classification
- Kingdom: Animalia
- Phylum: Arthropoda
- Class: Insecta
- Order: Hemiptera
- Suborder: Auchenorrhyncha
- Infraorder: Fulgoromorpha
- Family: Flatidae
- Subfamily: Flatinae
- Genus: Poekilloptera; Latreille, 1796

Synonyms
- Poeciloptera Latreille, 1804 (Emend.); Paekillopterus Duméril, 1806 (Missp.); Paecillopterus Froriep, 1806 (Missp.); Poekiloptera Rafinesque, 1815 (Missp.); Poecilloptera Latreille, 1817 (Missp.); Poekiloptere Duméril, 1820 (Missp.); Paecilloptera Schinz, 1823 (Missp.); Pocilloptera Latreille, 1828 (Missp.); Paeciloptera Gray, 1832 (Missp.); Triodites Gistel, 1848; Paciloptera Rathvon, 1869 (Missp.); Poesiloptera Matsumura, 1899 (Missp.); Paekilopterus Schulze, Kükenthal & Heider, 1933 (Missp.); Poekillopetera Daniel, 1946 (Missp.); Poeciloptora Metcalf, 1957 (Missp.)

= Poekilloptera =

Genus of planthoppers

Poekilloptera is a genus of South American planthoppers in the subfamily Flatinae and is the sole genus in the tribe Poekillopterini.

== Species ==
- Poekilloptera aperta (Melichar, 1901)
- Poekilloptera aurantiaca (Melichar, 1901)
- Poekilloptera fritillaria (Erichson, 1848)
- Poekilloptera melichari (Jacobi, 1904)
- Poekilloptera miliaria (Jacobi, 1904)
- Poekilloptera minor (Melichar, 1901)
- Poekilloptera modesta (Guérin-Méneville, 1834)
- Poekilloptera phalaenoides (Linnaeus, 1758)
- Poekilloptera sicula (Costa, 1840)
