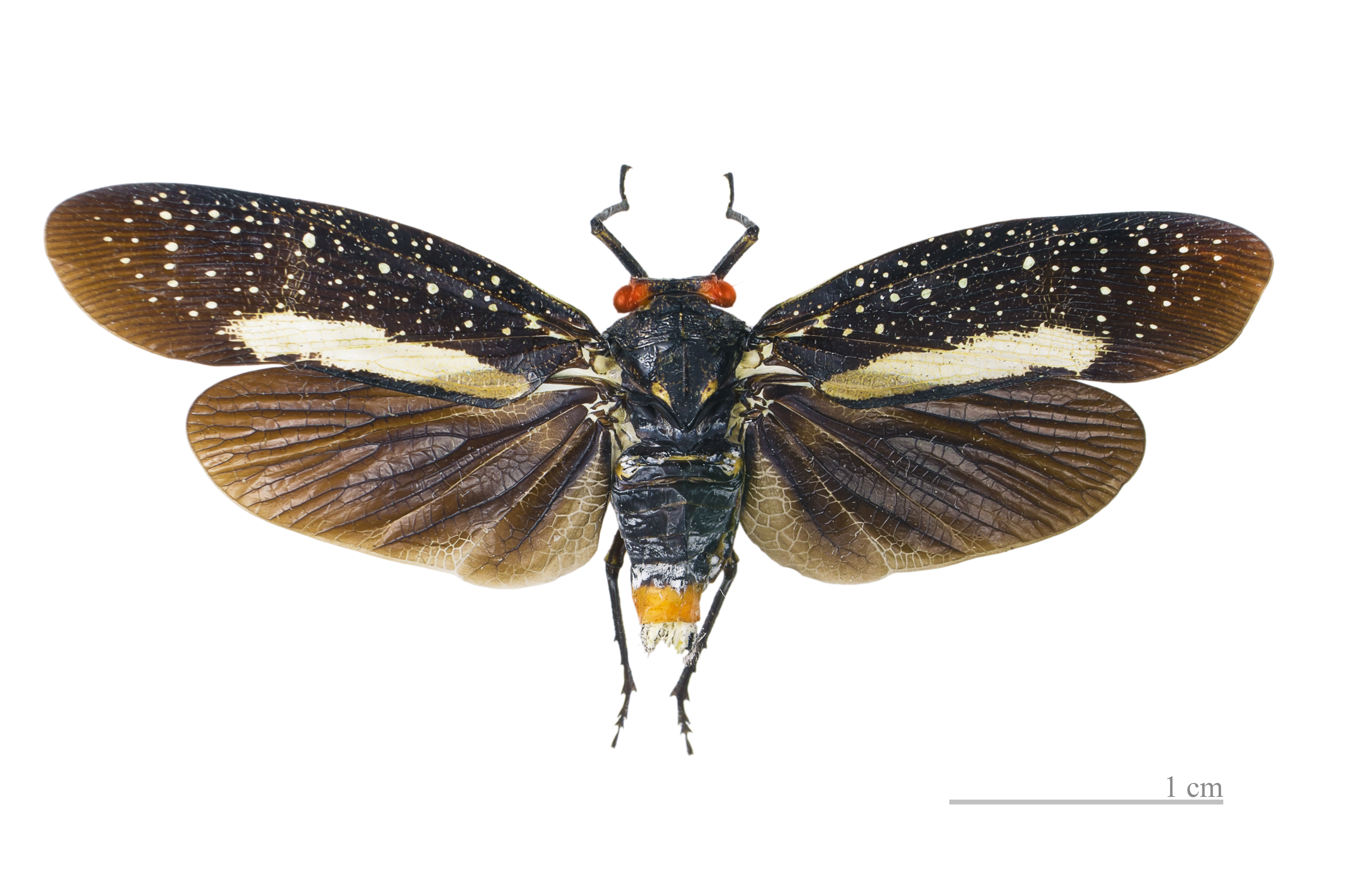
- Lystra lanata

Scientific classification
- Domain: Eukaryota
- Kingdom: Animalia
- Phylum: Arthropoda
- Class: Insecta
- Order: Hemiptera
- Suborder: Auchenorrhyncha
- Infraorder: Fulgoromorpha
- Family: Fulgoridae
- Subfamily: Poiocerinae
- Genus: Lystra; Fabricius, 1803

= Lystra (planthopper) =

Genus of planthoppers

Lystra is a genus of planthoppers in the family Fulgoridae, subfamily Poiocerinae. Species are distributed from North America to Brazil.

== Species ==
- Lystra cerifera Villada, 1881
- Lystra lanata (Linnaeus, 1758)
- Lystra pulverulenta (Olivier, 1791)
- Lystra striatula (Fabricius, 1794)
