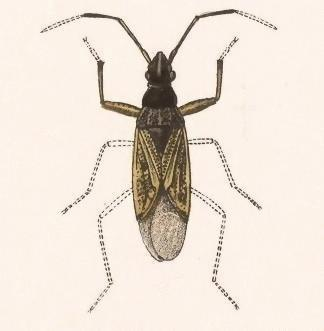

Scientific classification
- Domain: Eukaryota
- Kingdom: Animalia
- Phylum: Arthropoda
- Class: Insecta
- Order: Hemiptera
- Suborder: Heteroptera
- Family: Rhyparochromidae
- Tribe: Myodochini
- Genus: Ligyrocoris
- Species: L. litigiosus

Binomial name
- Ligyrocoris litigiosus (Stal, 1862)

= Ligyrocoris litigiosus =

Species of insect

Ligyrocoris litigiosus is a species of dirt-colored seed bug in the family Rhyparochromidae. It is found in the Caribbean Sea, Central America, North America, and South America.
