= Cryptomyzus =

Scientific classification
- Kingdom: Animalia
- Phylum: Arthropoda
- Class: Insecta
- Order: Hemiptera
- Suborder: Sternorrhyncha
- Family: Aphididae
- Genus: Cryptomyzus; Oestlund, 1923

Genus of true bugs

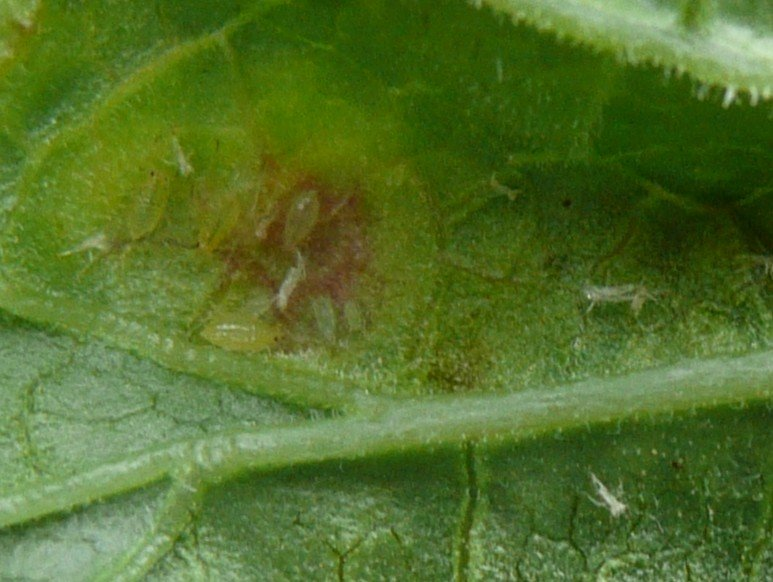

Cryptomyzus is a genus of true bugs belonging to the family Aphididae.

The species of this genus are found in Europe and Eastern Asia.

Species:

- Cryptomyzus galeopsidis
- Cryptomyzus korschelti
- Cryptomyzus ribis
