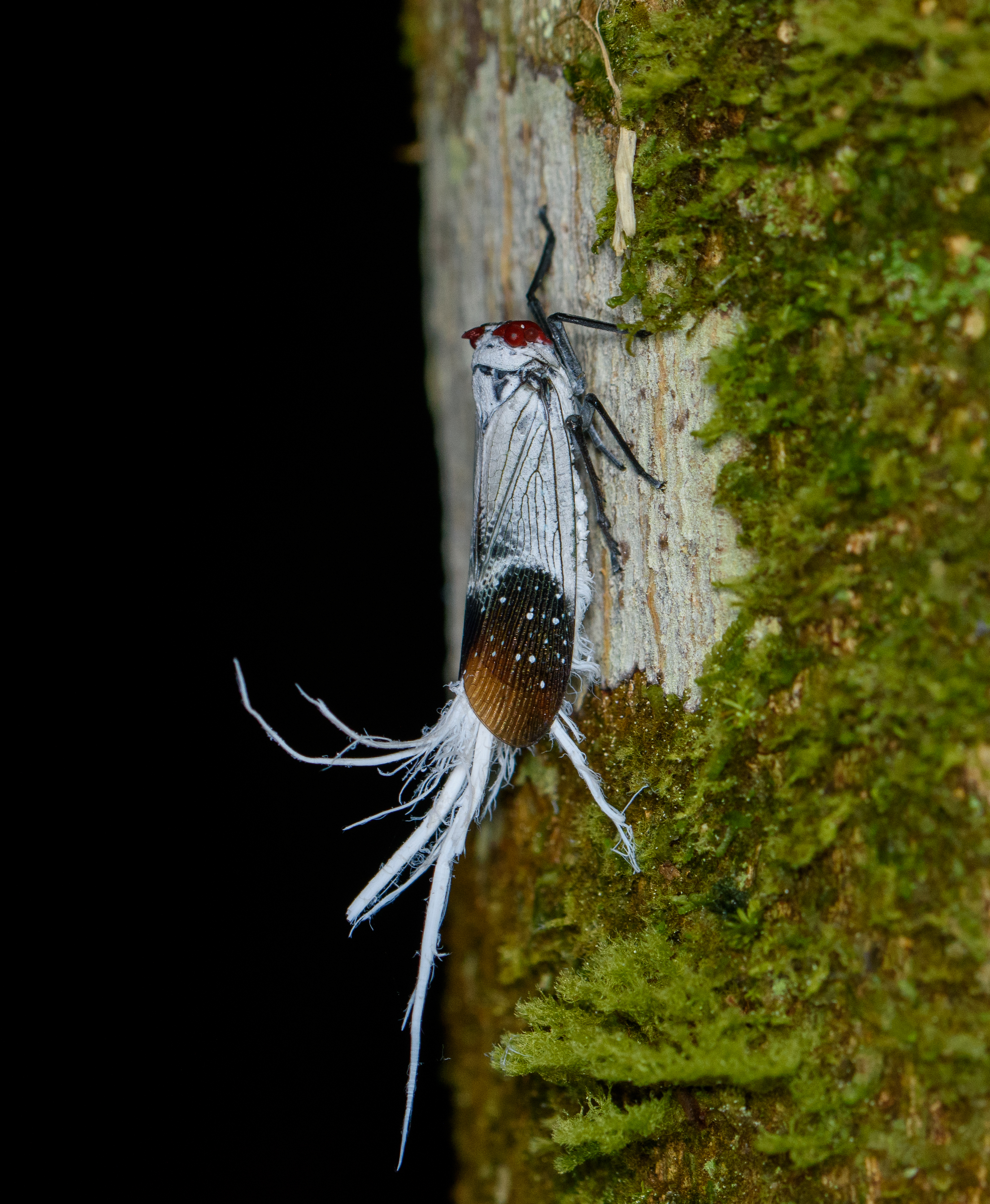

Scientific classification
- Kingdom: Animalia
- Phylum: Arthropoda
- Class: Insecta
- Order: Hemiptera
- Suborder: Auchenorrhyncha
- Infraorder: Fulgoromorpha
- Family: Fulgoridae
- Genus: Lystra
- Species: L. pulverulenta

Binomial name
- Lystra pulverulenta (Olivier, 1791)

Synonyms
- Fulgora pulverulenta Olivier, 1791

= Lystra pulverulenta =

Species of insect

Lystra pulverulenta is a species of planthopper in the genus Lystra. It is found in South America.

== Identification ==
With a waxed head and thorax, it has an elaborate long "tail of wax". The basal 2/3rds of the forewing is whole waxed, by which it can be separated from L. lanata. The remainder of the forewing is black.

== Distribution ==
The species is found in Brazil, Suriname, and French Guinea.
