= Ligyrocoris diffusus =

Scientific classification
- Domain: Eukaryota
- Kingdom: Animalia
- Phylum: Arthropoda
- Class: Insecta
- Order: Hemiptera
- Suborder: Heteroptera
- Family: Rhyparochromidae
- Tribe: Myodochini
- Genus: Ligyrocoris
- Species: L. diffusus

Binomial name
- Ligyrocoris diffusus Uhler, 1871

Species of true bug

Ligyrocoris diffusus is a species of dirt-colored seed bug in the family Rhyparochromidae. It is found in Central America and North America.
