= Ligyrocoris latimarginatus =

Scientific classification
- Domain: Eukaryota
- Kingdom: Animalia
- Phylum: Arthropoda
- Class: Insecta
- Order: Hemiptera
- Suborder: Heteroptera
- Family: Rhyparochromidae
- Tribe: Myodochini
- Genus: Ligyrocoris
- Species: L. latimarginatus

Binomial name
- Ligyrocoris latimarginatus Barber, 1921

Species of true bug

Ligyrocoris latimarginatus is a species of dirt-colored seed bug in the family Rhyparochromidae. It is found in North America.
