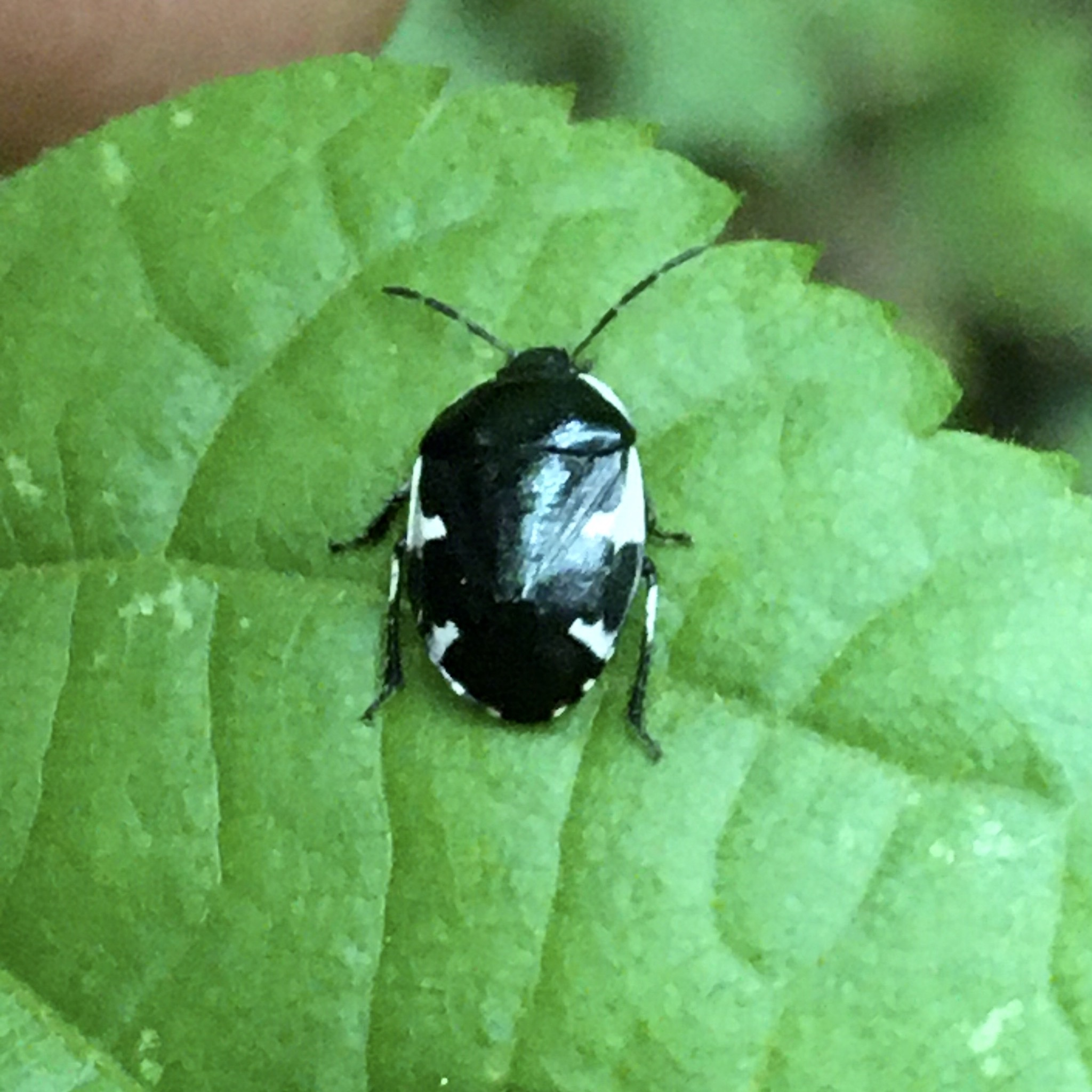

Scientific classification
- Kingdom: Animalia
- Phylum: Arthropoda
- Class: Insecta
- Order: Hemiptera
- Suborder: Heteroptera
- Family: Cydnidae
- Genus: Tritomegas
- Species: T. sexmaculatus

Binomial name
- Tritomegas sexmaculatus (Rambur, 1839)

= Tritomegas sexmaculatus =

Species of insect

Tritomegas sexmaculatus (Rambur's pied shieldbug) is a shield bug in the genus Tritomegas, which has length of 6–8 mm.

== Range ==
Tritomegas sexmaculatus occurs from the west coast of Europe to Iran. It colonised Britain relatively recently, with the first record in 2011, but has spread rapidly in the southeast since then.

Its main food plant is black horehound (Ballota nigra).
