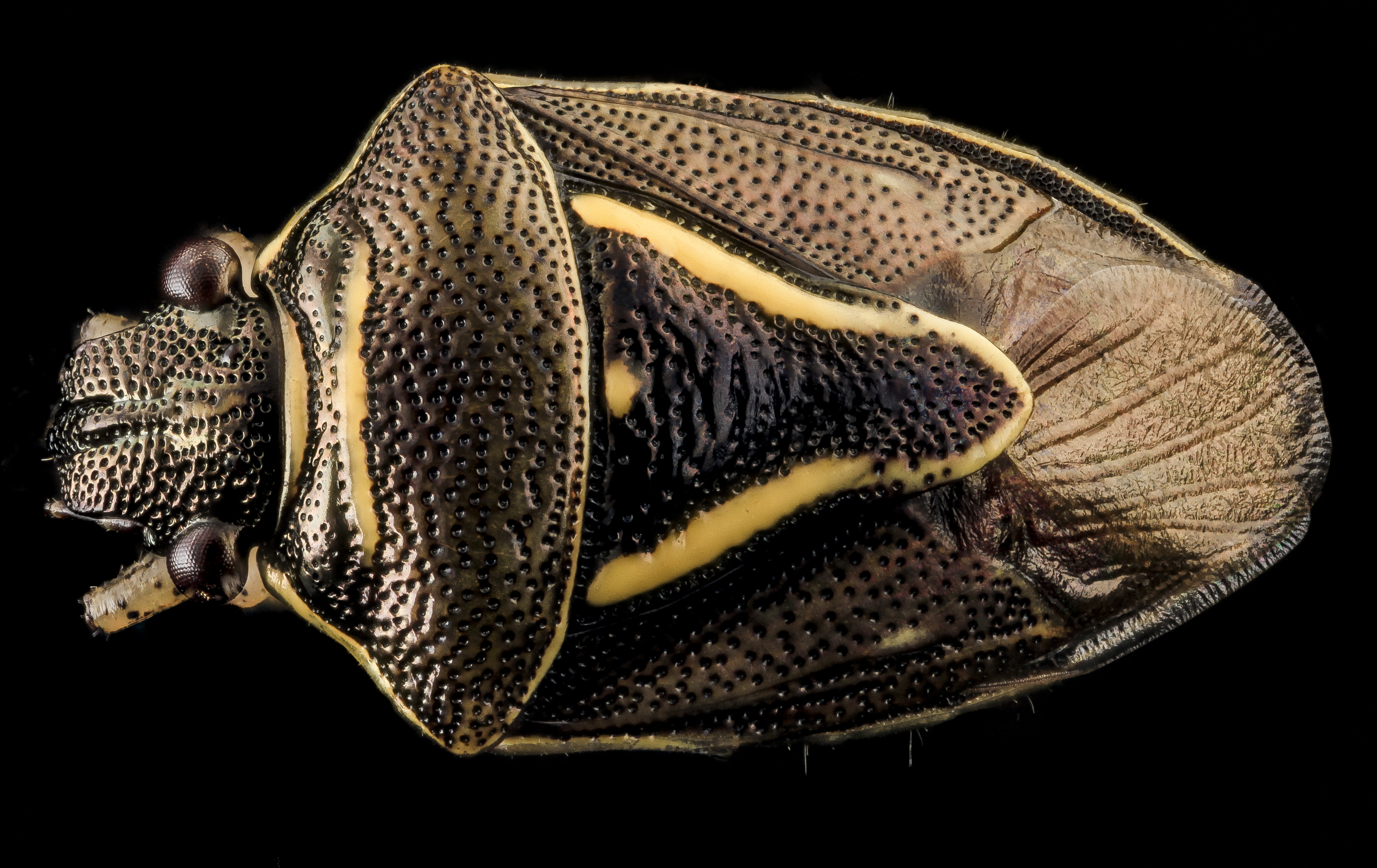

Scientific classification
- Domain: Eukaryota
- Kingdom: Animalia
- Phylum: Arthropoda
- Class: Insecta
- Order: Hemiptera
- Suborder: Heteroptera
- Family: Pentatomidae
- Genus: Mormidea
- Species: M. lugens

Binomial name
- Mormidea lugens (Fabricius, 1775)

= Mormidea lugens =

Species of true bug

Mormidea lugens is a species of stink bug in the family Pentatomidae found in the Caribbean, Central America, and Eastern North America. In Illinois, adults have been observed emerging from overwintering sites in late April, and continue to be observed until early November, and appear to be bivoltine in this area. Eggs are approximately 0.7 millimetres (0.028 in) in diameter, pale yellow, and laid in small clusters of 6 to 11 eggs (mean = 9.6). Adults are bronze in color, with a white-yellow border around the scutellum, and are 5.0–7.2 millimetres (0.20–0.28 in) in length. In laboratory conditions, at approximately 24 °C (75 °F), development from eggs to adults has been documented to take between 39 and 50 days, and appears to be affected by the species of host plant. Mormidea lugens has been documented to feed on timothy, sedges (including Carex shortiana, C. amphibola, C. normalis), as well as deer-tongue grass (Panicum clandestinum), and Bosc's panic-grass (P. boscii). It has been collected from pale sedge (C. blanda) and wide-leaved spiderwort (Tradescantia subaspera) but has not observed feeding on these species, and deer-tongue grass appears to be an insufficient food source for development.

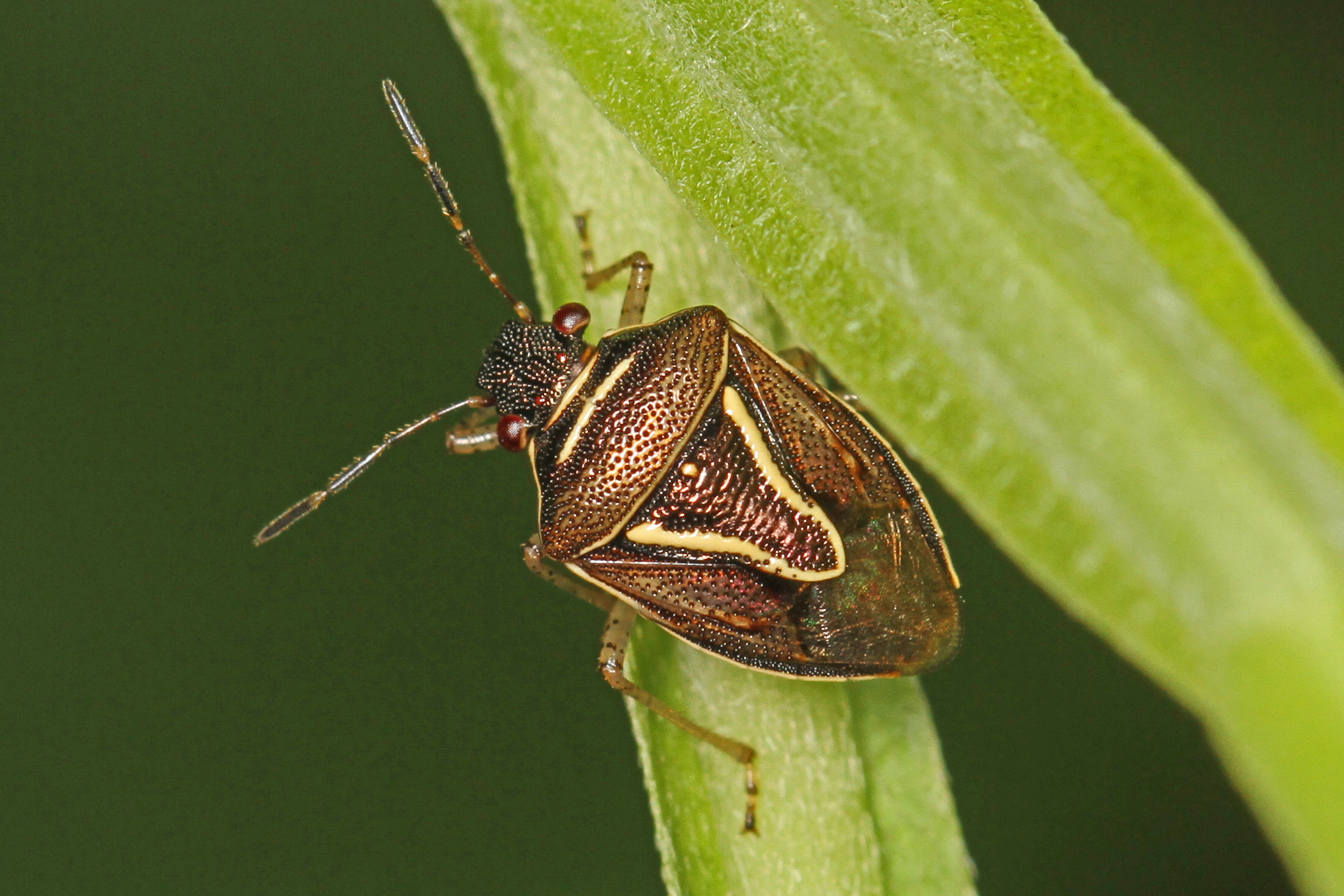
