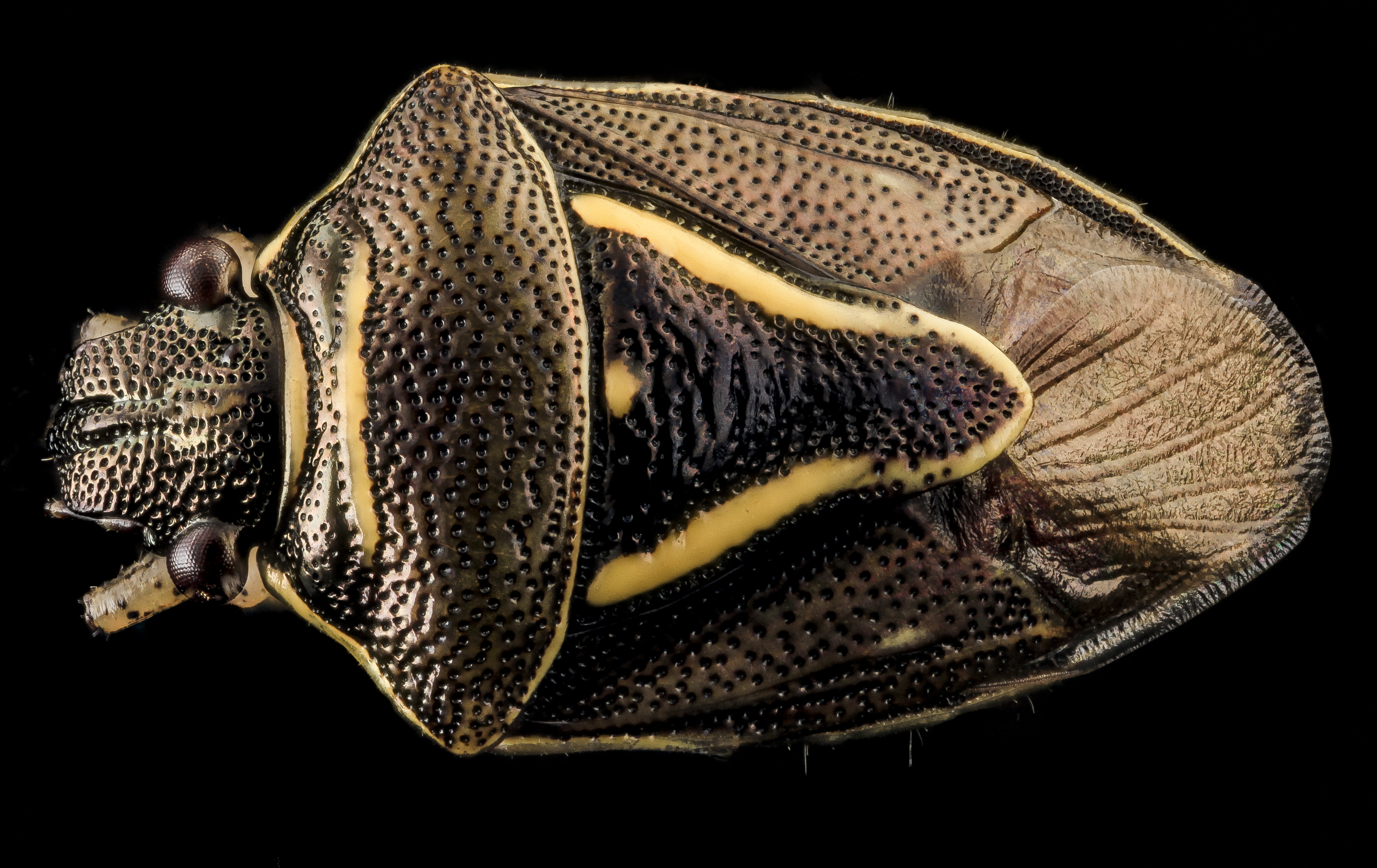
- Mormidea lugens

Scientific classification
- Domain: Eukaryota
- Kingdom: Animalia
- Phylum: Arthropoda
- Class: Insecta
- Order: Hemiptera
- Suborder: Heteroptera
- Family: Pentatomidae
- Tribe: Pentatomini
- Genus: Mormidea; Amyot & Serville, 1843

= Mormidea =

Genus of true bugs

Mormidea is a genus of stink bugs in the family Pentatomidae. There are about five described species in Mormidea.

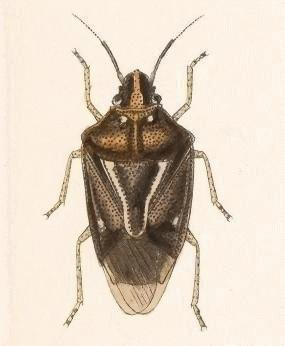
Mormidea pictiventris

== Species ==
These five species belong to the genus Mormidea:

- Mormidea cubrosa Dallas, 1851
- Mormidea lugens (Fabricius, 1775)
- Mormidea pama Rolston, 1978
- Mormidea pictiventris Stål, 1862
- Mormidea ypsilon (Linnaeus, 1758)
