= Mormidea cubrosa =

Scientific classification
- Domain: Eukaryota
- Kingdom: Animalia
- Phylum: Arthropoda
- Class: Insecta
- Order: Hemiptera
- Suborder: Heteroptera
- Family: Pentatomidae
- Tribe: Pentatomini
- Genus: Mormidea
- Species: M. cubrosa

Binomial name
- Mormidea cubrosa Dallas, 1851

Species of true bug

Mormidea cubrosa is a species of stink bug in the family Pentatomidae. It is found in the Caribbean Sea, Central America, North America, and South America.
