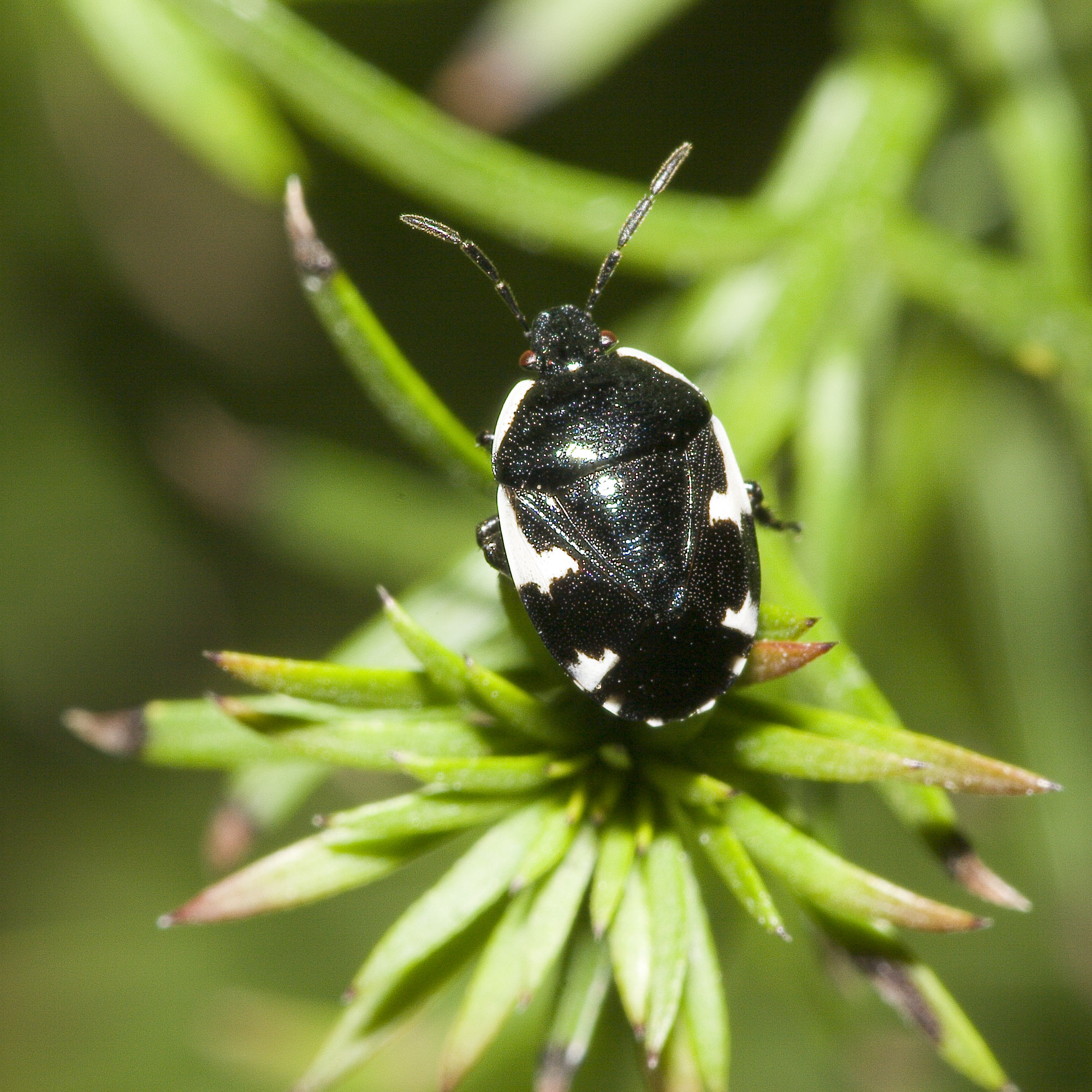

Scientific classification
- Domain: Eukaryota
- Kingdom: Animalia
- Phylum: Arthropoda
- Class: Insecta
- Order: Hemiptera
- Suborder: Heteroptera
- Family: Cydnidae
- Genus: Tritomegas; Amyot & Serville, 1843

Species
- See text

= Tritomegas =

Genus of true bugs

Tritomegas is a genus of shield bugs.

== Species ==
- Tritomegas bicolor (Linnaeus, 1758) - the pied shieldbug
- Tritomegas micans (Horváth, 1899)
- Tritomegas rotundipennis (Dohrn, 1862)
- Tritomegas sexmaculatus (Rambur, 1839)
- Tritomegas theryi (Lindberg, 1932)
