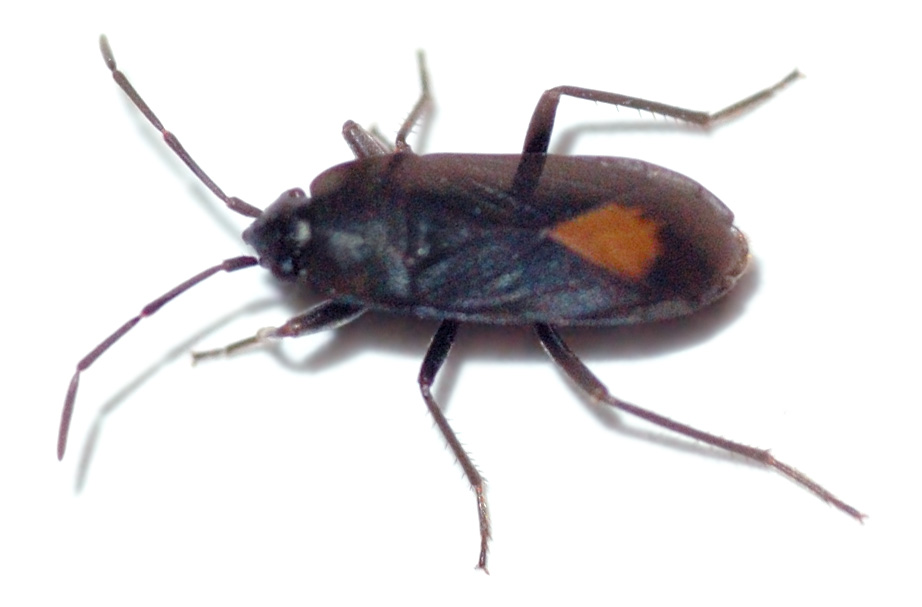
- Aphanus rolandri

Scientific classification
- Kingdom: Animalia
- Phylum: Arthropoda
- Class: Insecta
- Order: Hemiptera
- Suborder: Heteroptera
- Family: Rhyparochromidae
- Subfamily: Rhyparochrominae
- Tribe: Gonianotini
- Genus: Aphanus; Laporte & de Castelnau, 1832

= Aphanus =

Genus of true bugs

Aphanus is a genus of dirt-colored seed bugs in the family Rhyparochromidae. There are more than 20 described species in Aphanus.

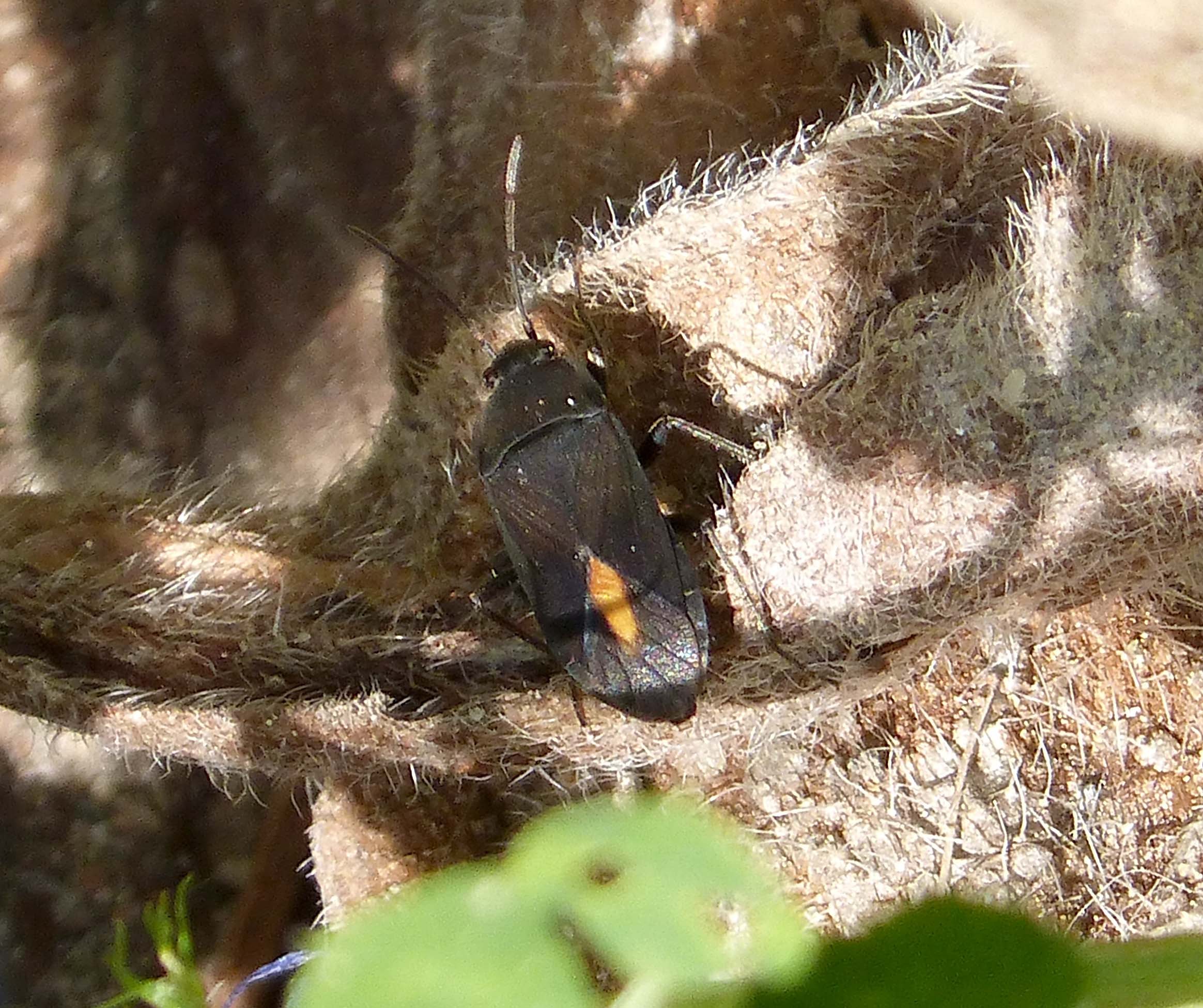
Aphanus rolandri

== Species ==
These 21 species belong to the genus Aphanus:

- Aphanus carpenteri (Slater, 1964)
- Aphanus oculatus (Germar, 1837)
- Aphanus rolandri Linnaeus, 1758
- Aphanus zucholdi (Giebel *, 1856)
- † Aphanus antiquus (Heyden, 1859)
- † Aphanus boyeri (Hope *, 1847)
- † Aphanus coloratus (Germar & Berendt, 1856)
- † Aphanus contractus Theobald, 1937
- † Aphanus cruciatus (Heer *, 1861)
- † Aphanus detectus (Forster *, 1891)
- † Aphanus dilatatus Theobald, 1937
- † Aphanus dryadum (Heer, 1853)
- † Aphanus grassei (Piton & Theobald, 1935)
- † Aphanus heeri (Giebel *, 1856)
- † Aphanus morio (Heer, 1853)
- † Aphanus nigropedis (Jordan, 1967)
- † Aphanus oblongus (Heer, 1853)
- † Aphanus obsoletus (Heer, 1853)
- † Aphanus petrensis (Scudder, 1890)
- † Aphanus pulchellus (Heer, 1853)
- † Aphanus senius (Germar & Berendt, 1856)
