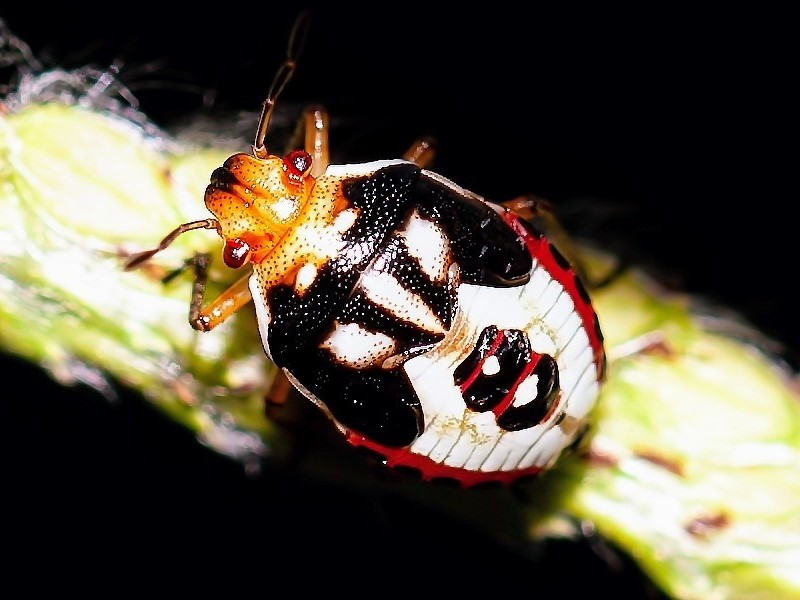

Scientific classification
- Domain: Eukaryota
- Kingdom: Animalia
- Phylum: Arthropoda
- Class: Insecta
- Order: Hemiptera
- Suborder: Heteroptera
- Family: Pentatomidae
- Tribe: Pentatomini
- Genus: Mormidea
- Species: M. pama

Binomial name
- Mormidea pama Rolston, 1978

= Mormidea pama =

Species of true bug

Mormidea pama is a species of stink bug in the family Pentatomidae. It is found in the Caribbean, Central America, North America, and South America.
