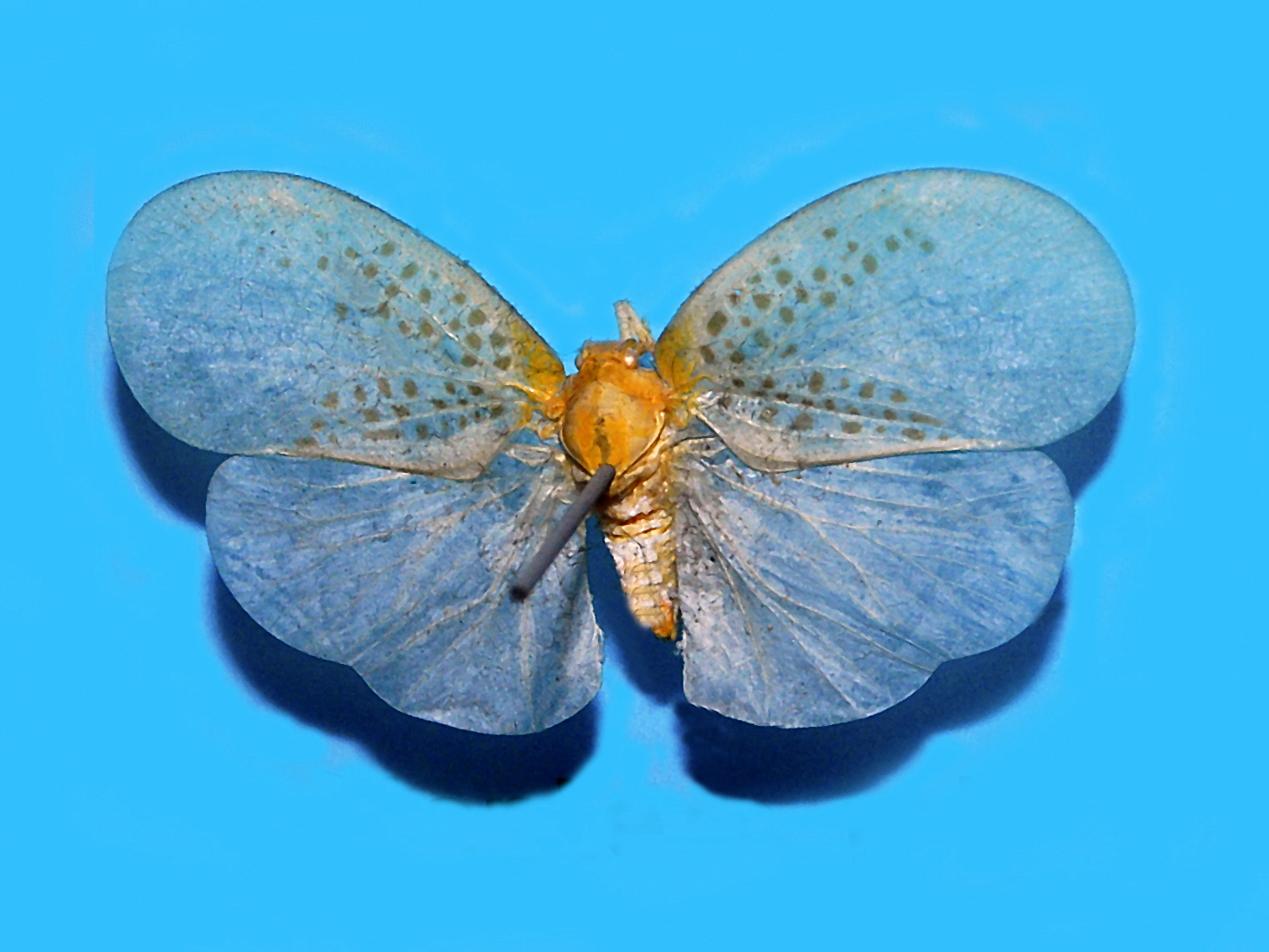
- Poekilloptera minor. Museum specimen

Scientific classification
- Kingdom: Animalia
- Phylum: Arthropoda
- Clade: Pancrustacea
- Class: Insecta
- Order: Hemiptera
- Suborder: Auchenorrhyncha
- Infraorder: Fulgoromorpha
- Family: Flatidae
- Genus: Poekilloptera
- Species: P. minor

Binomial name
- Poekilloptera minor Melichar, 1901

Synonyms
- Poeciloptera minor Jacobi, 1904; Poeciloptera phalaenoides minor Melichar, 1923

= Poekilloptera minor =

Species of planthopper

Poekilloptera minor is a species of planthopper in the family Flatidae, occurring in Brazil, Colombia and Venezuela.
