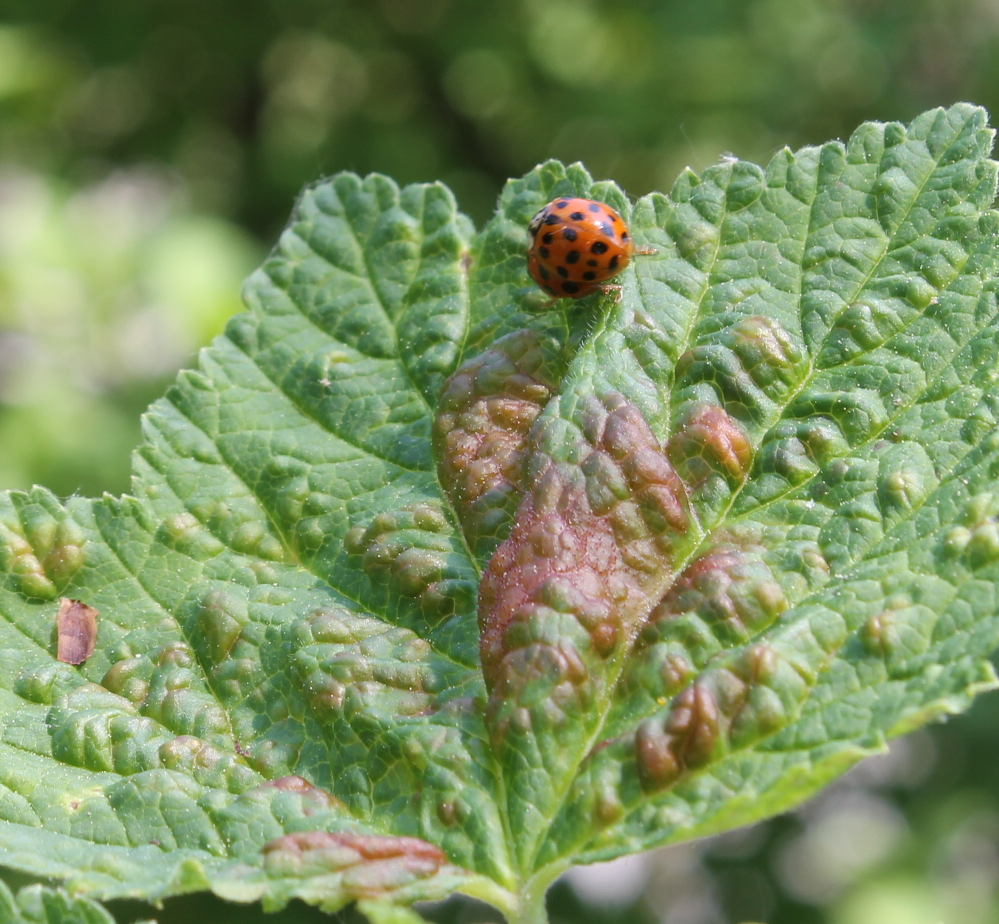

Scientific classification
- Kingdom: Animalia
- Phylum: Arthropoda
- Class: Insecta
- Order: Hemiptera
- Suborder: Sternorrhyncha
- Family: Aphididae
- Genus: Cryptomyzus
- Species: C. ribis

Binomial name
- Cryptomyzus ribis (Linnaeus, 1758)

Synonyms
- Aphis ribis Linnaeus, 1758

= Cryptomyzus ribis =

Species of true bugs

Cryptomyzus ribis is a species of true bug found in Europe and described by the Swedish taxonomist, Carl Linnaeus in 1758. The larvae feed on the leaves of currant bushes (Ribes species), especially red currant, creating abnormal plant growths, known as galls.

== Description ==
Signs of Cryptomyzus ribis are domed blisters on the leaves of, mainly red and white currant bushes. Soon after the leaves open in the spring, the galls are yellow and turn red by the early summer. Leaves can also be crinkled, with a colony of yellow-greenish aphids living in the hairy depressions on the underside of the leaves. Cultivars of red currants are preferred. Adults are 1–2 millimetres (0.039–0.079 in) long. During the summer some mature aphids leave the galls and migrate to a secondary host, hedge woundwort (Stachys sylvatica), while others stay on currants. All produce several generations, and in the autumn, females lay overwintering eggs on currant twigs, which hatch the following spring.

Red currant (Ribes rubrum) is the preferred species (including varieties of white currant), but the aphid has also been recorded on mountain currant (Ribes alpinum), wild black currant (Ribes americanum), golden currant (Ribes aureum), blackcurrant (Ribes nigrum), Canadian gooseberry (Ribes oxyacanthoides), rock currant (Ribes petraeum) and European gooseberry (Ribes uva-crispa).

Other species

Damage, such as buckled, crumpled, inrolled and distorted leaves, can be caused by other species of aphids, but without the thickening of tissue are not considered to be true galls.

== Distribution ==
Cryptomyzus ribis is found in most of mainland Europe, with the exception of Albania, Austria, Croatia, Gibraltar, Liechtenstein, Luxembourg, Portugal and Turkey.
