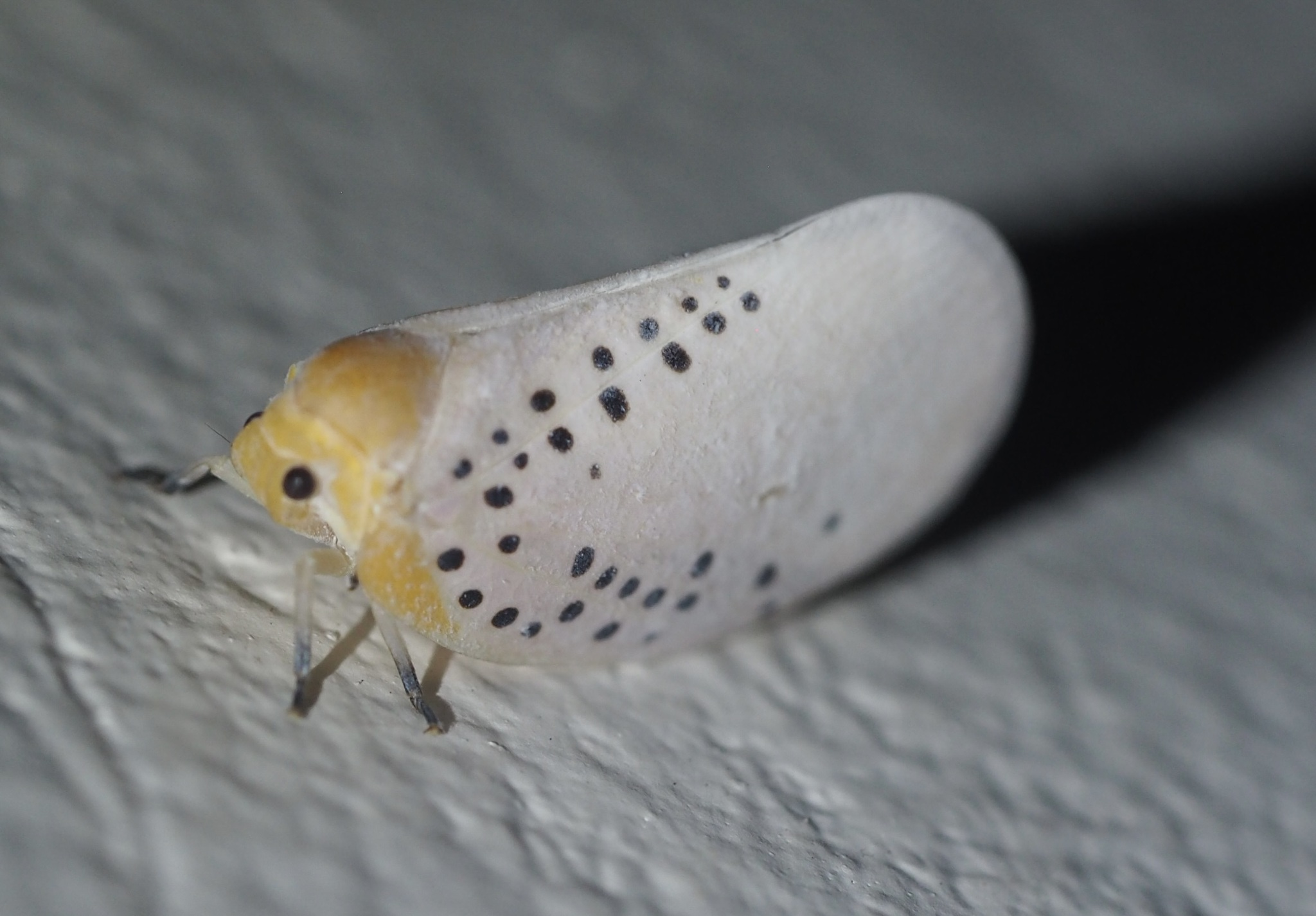

Scientific classification
- Kingdom: Animalia
- Phylum: Arthropoda
- Class: Insecta
- Order: Hemiptera
- Suborder: Auchenorrhyncha
- Infraorder: Fulgoromorpha
- Family: Flatidae
- Genus: Poekilloptera
- Species: P. phalaenoides

Binomial name
- Poekilloptera phalaenoides (Linnaeus, 1758)

Synonyms
- Cicada phalaenoides, Linnaeus, 1758; Fulgora phalaenoides, Oliver, 1791; Flata phalaenoides, (Linnaeus, 1758); Poecilloptera phalaenoides, Germar, 1818

= Poekilloptera phalaenoides =

Species of planthopper

Poekilloptera phalaenoides is a species of planthopper in the family Flatidae. The species can be found in Central America and South America.
