= Pterocomma salicis =

Scientific classification
- Kingdom: Animalia
- Phylum: Arthropoda
- Clade: Pancrustacea
- Class: Insecta
- Order: Hemiptera
- Suborder: Sternorrhyncha
- Family: Aphididae
- Genus: Pterocomma
- Species: P. salicis

Binomial name
- Pterocomma salicis (Linnaeus, 1758)

Species of true bug

Pterocomma salicis, the black willow bark aphid, is a species of aphid in the family Aphididae.
