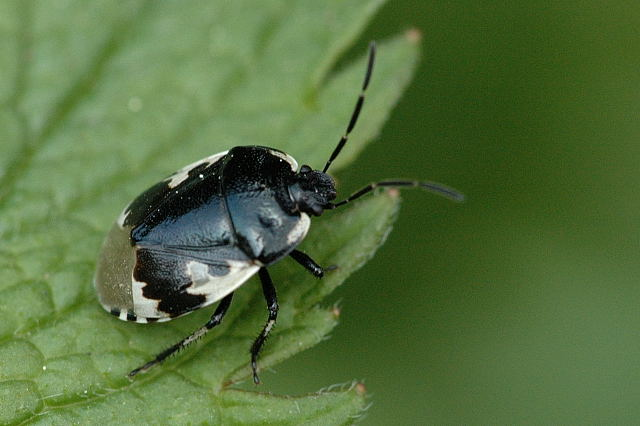

Scientific classification
- Kingdom: Animalia
- Phylum: Arthropoda
- Class: Insecta
- Order: Hemiptera
- Suborder: Heteroptera
- Family: Cydnidae
- Genus: Tritomegas
- Species: T. bicolor

Binomial name
- Tritomegas bicolor (Linnaeus, 1758)

Synonyms
- Sehirus bicolor (Linnaeus, 1758); Cimex bicolor Linnaeus, 1758

= Tritomegas bicolor =

Species of true bug

Tritomegas bicolor, the pied shield bug, is a species of burrowing bug found in Europe. The adult is black and white and 5.5–7 mm (0.22–0.28 in) long.

Tritomegas bicolor

It is found across North Africa, Europe and Central Asia, although in the British Isles, it becomes rarer towards the north, and is absent from Scotland and Ireland. T. bicolor lives mainly on the ground, but is also visible on its host plants — chiefly Lamium (dead nettles) and Ballota nigra (black horehound).
