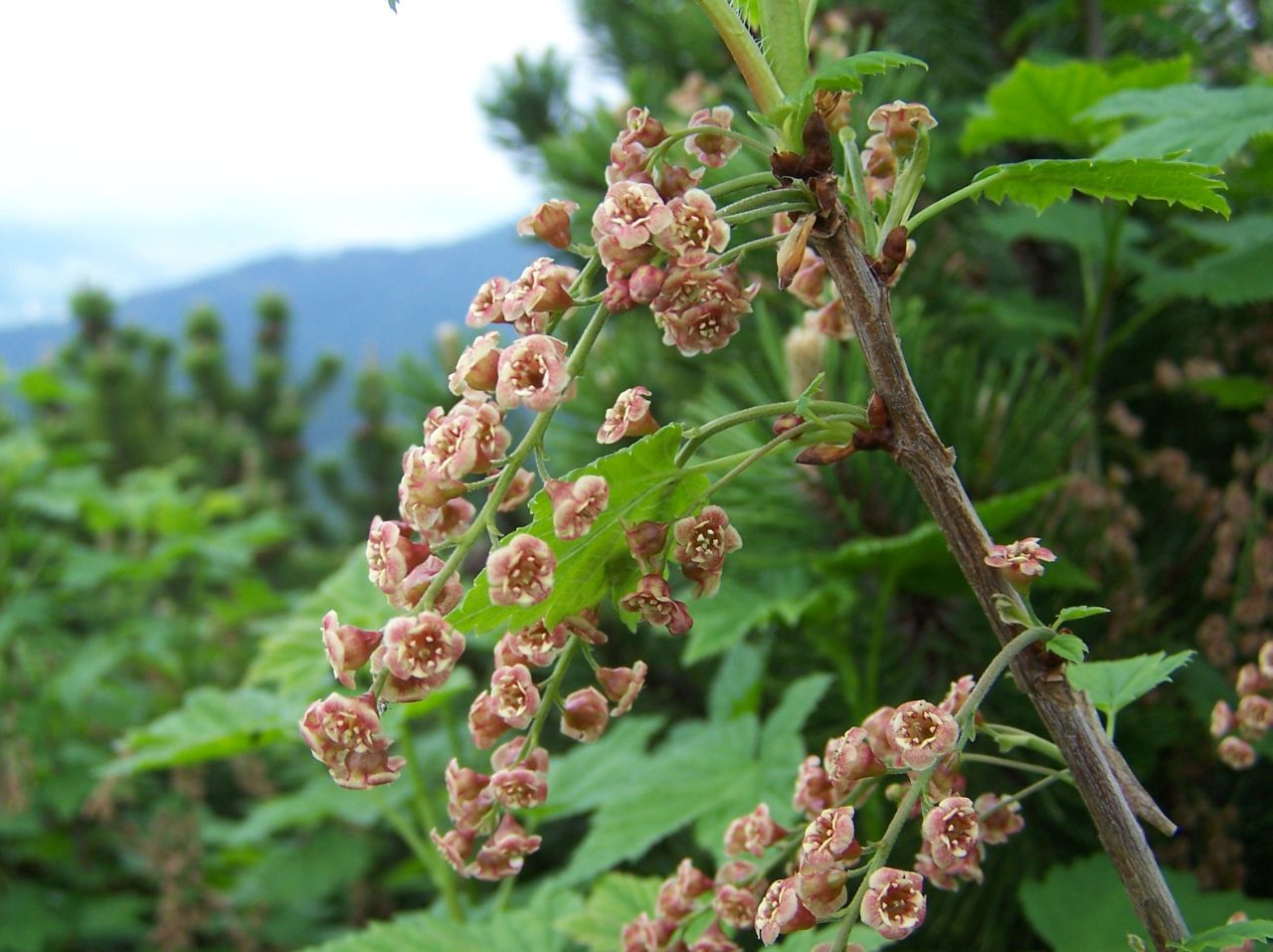

Scientific classification
- Kingdom: Plantae
- Clade: Tracheophytes
- Clade: Angiosperms
- Clade: Eudicots
- Order: Saxifragales
- Family: Grossulariaceae
- Genus: Ribes
- Species: R. petraeum

Binomial name
- Ribes petraeum Wulf.

Synonyms
- Ribes atropurpureum C.A.Mey.

= Ribes petraeum =

Species of currant

Ribes petraeum, the rock currant, rock redcurrant, or Bieberstein's rock currant is a species of Ribes found in Europe.
