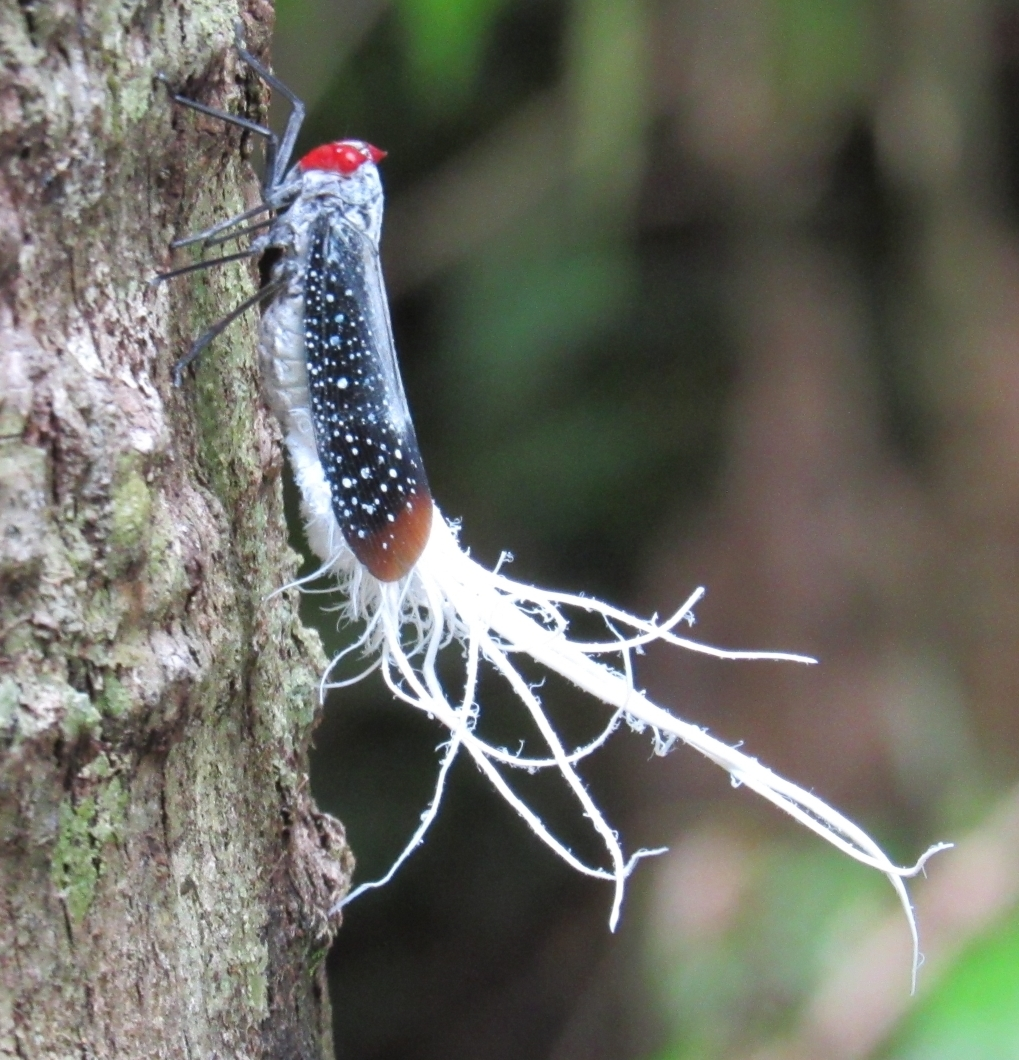

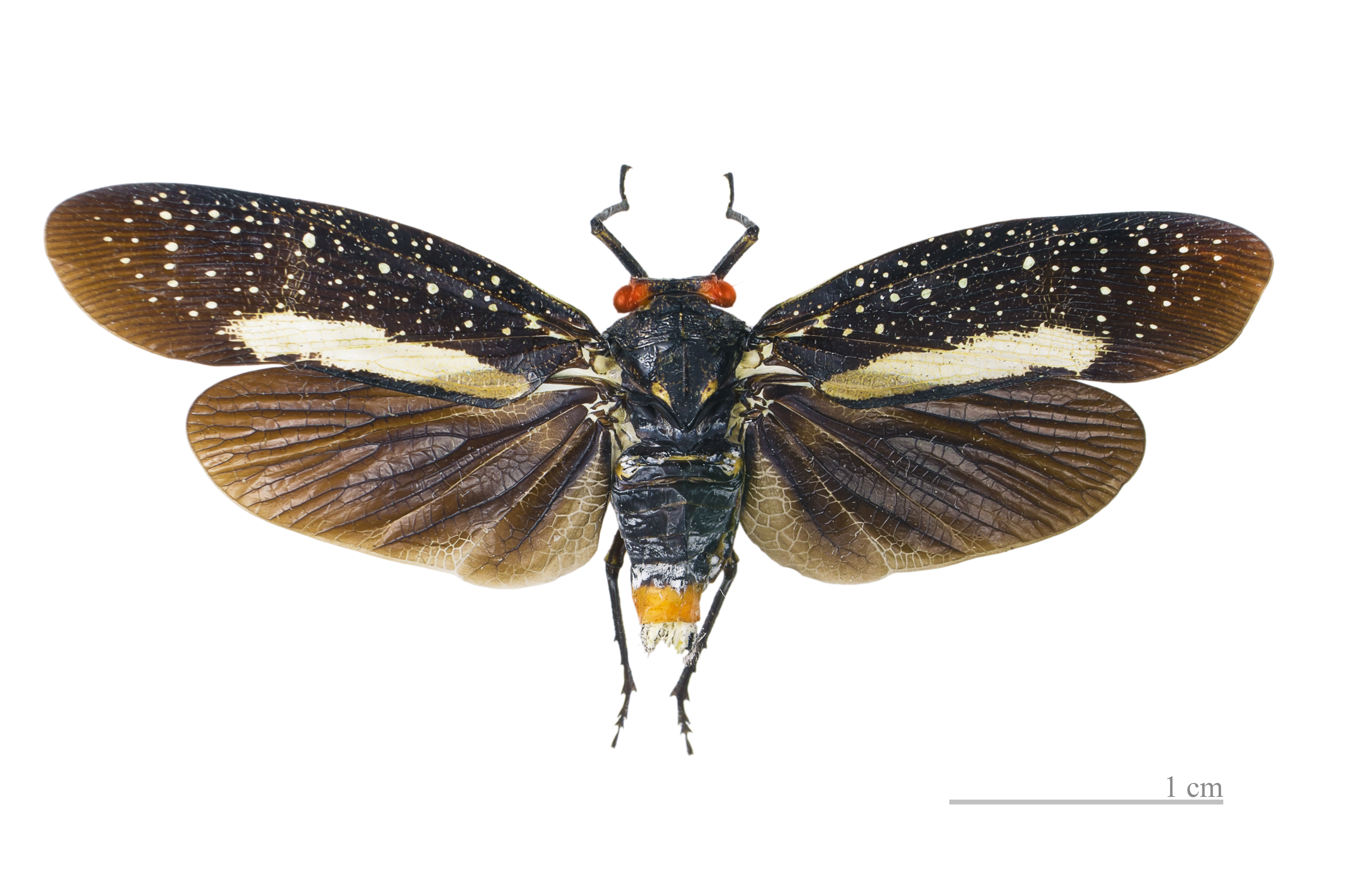

Scientific classification
- Kingdom: Animalia
- Phylum: Arthropoda
- Class: Insecta
- Order: Hemiptera
- Suborder: Auchenorrhyncha
- Infraorder: Fulgoromorpha
- Family: Fulgoridae
- Genus: Lystra
- Species: L. lanata

Binomial name
- Lystra lanata (Linnaeus, 1758)

= Lystra lanata =

Species of insect

Lystra lanata is a planthopper species in the genus Lystra. Originally described by Carl Linnaeus by its basionym Cicada lanata.

== Description ==
Lystra lanata has black wings with blue spots and red sides to its head. It can be differentiated from Lystra pulverulenta by the white area of the wing being confined to an edge.

== Range ==
This species is found in Brazil, French Guiana, French West Indies, Guyana, Mexico, and Suriname.

== Host ==
A host plant of this species is the tree Simarouba amara. L. lanata was witnessed gathering in a group on this tree at a locality near where the Napo and Yagua rivers join.
