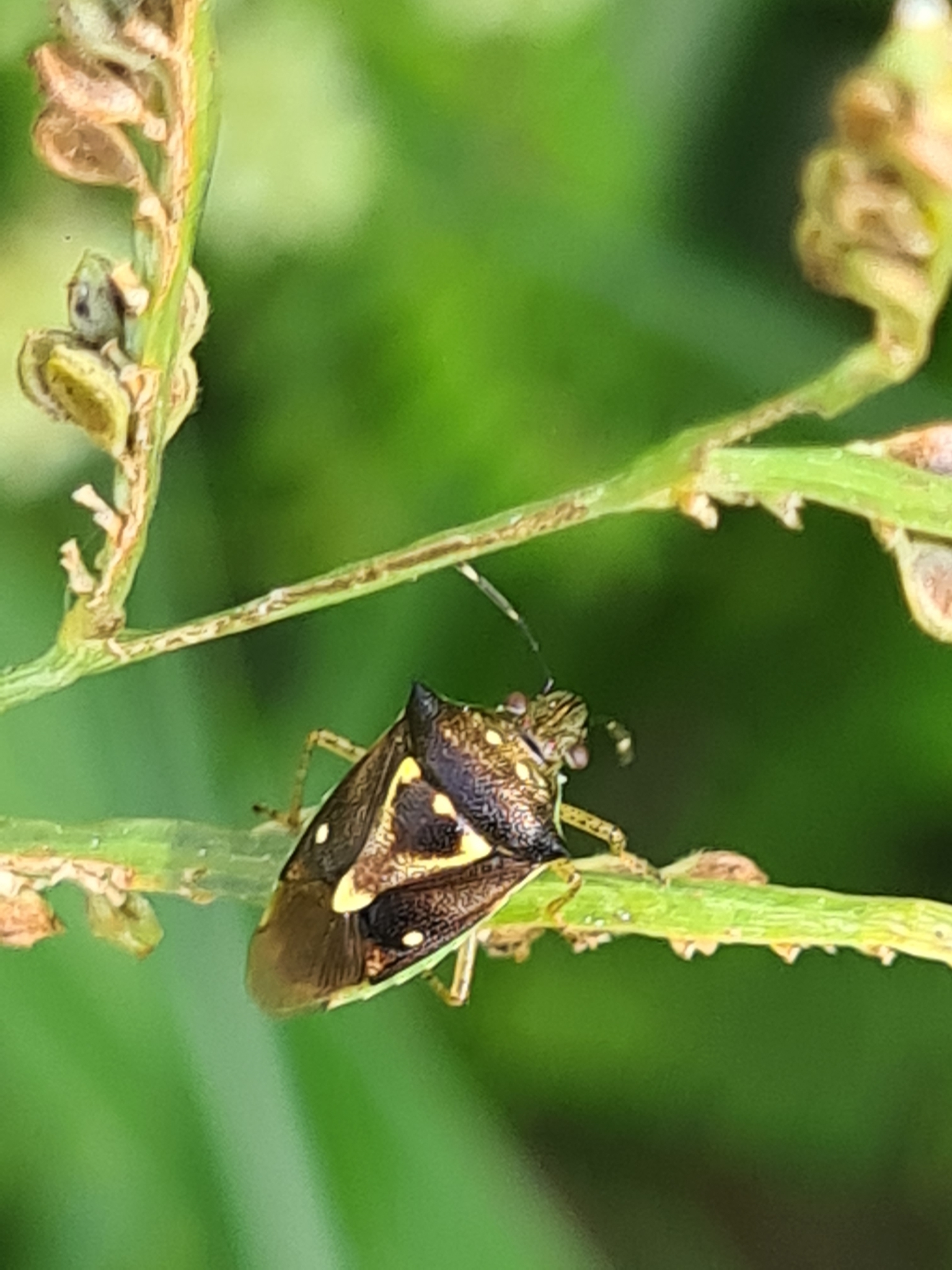

Scientific classification
- Kingdom: Animalia
- Phylum: Arthropoda
- Class: Insecta
- Order: Hemiptera
- Suborder: Heteroptera
- Family: Pentatomidae
- Tribe: Pentatomini
- Genus: Mormidea
- Species: M. ypsilon

Binomial name
- Mormidea ypsilon (Linnaeus, 1758)

Synonyms
- Cimex ypsilon Linnaeus, 1758

= Mormidea ypsilon =

Species of true bug

Mormidea ypsilon is a species of stink bug in the family Pentatomidae found in Mexico, Central and South American countries as well as the Lesser Antilles.

== Taxonomy ==
This species was first described by Carl Linnaeus in 1758 and named Cimex ypsilon.

== Description ==
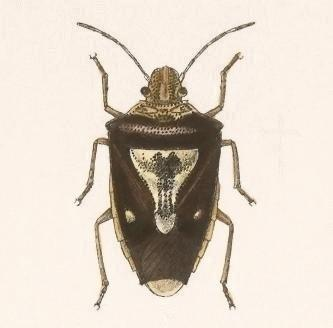
Illustration in Biologia Centrali-Americana of Mormidea ypsilon

The length of this beetle is between 7 and 9 mm. It is coloured brown with yellow hints and has a prominent pale cream to yellow Y shaped mark on the scutellum. The shoulders of the pronotum may be narrowly rounded or alternatively have spines.

== Distribution ==
This species is present in Argentina, Brazil, Colombia, Guatemala, British Guiana, Honduras, Mexico, Nicaragua, Panama, Suriname, Uruguay and the Lesser Antilles.
