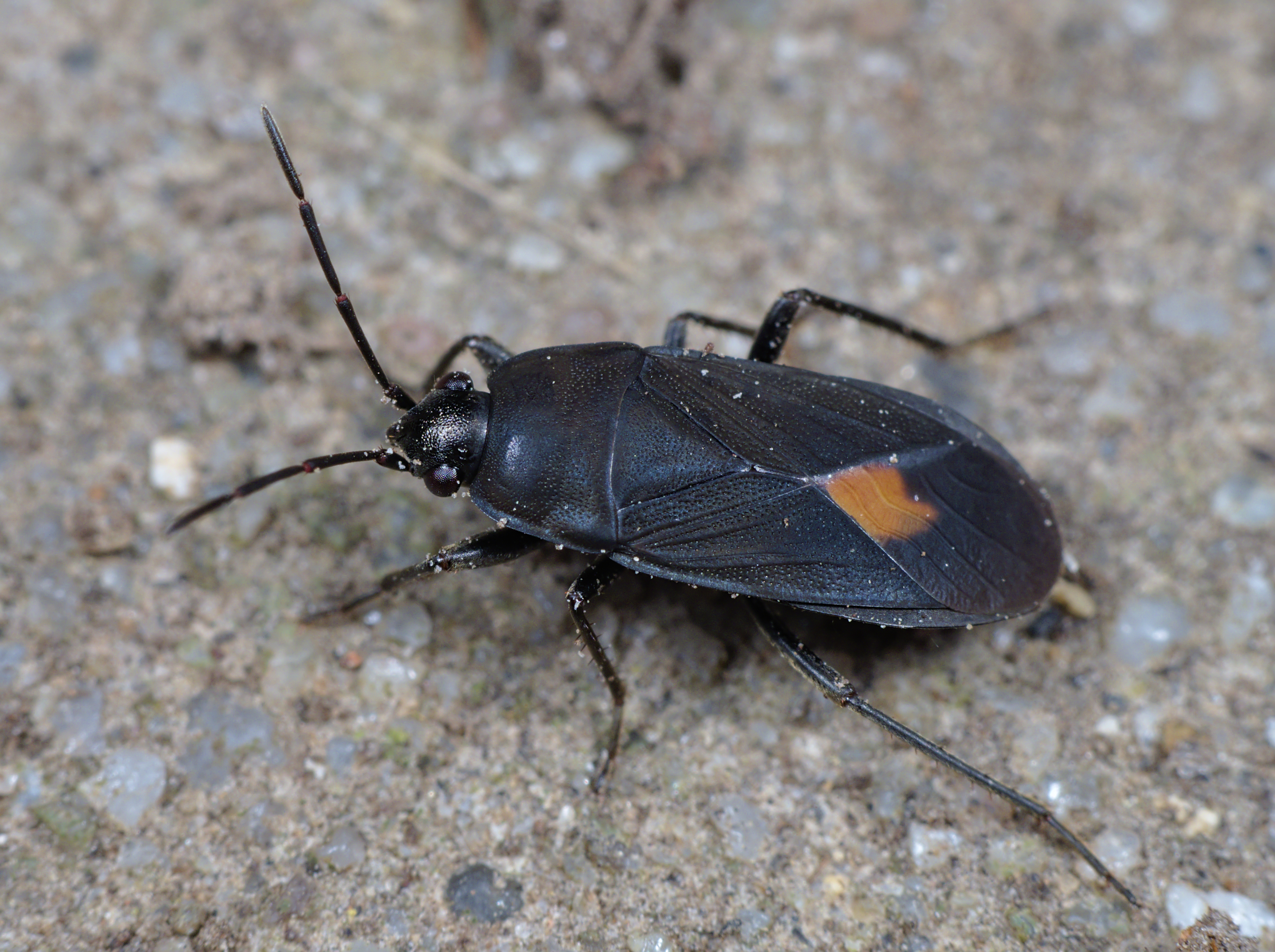
- Aphanus rolandri

Scientific classification
- Kingdom: Animalia
- Phylum: Arthropoda
- Clade: Pancrustacea
- Class: Insecta
- Order: Hemiptera
- Suborder: Heteroptera
- Family: Rhyparochromidae
- Subfamily: Rhyparochrominae
- Tribe: Gonianotini
- Genus: Aphanus
- Species: A. rolandri

Binomial name
- Aphanus rolandri Linnaeus, 1758

= Aphanus rolandri =

Species of dirt-colored seed bug

Aphanus rolandri is a species of dirt-colored seed bug in the family Rhyparochromidae, found in the Palearctic.

== Etymology ==
The species was named after Daniel Rolander, a Swedish biologist and one of the Apostles of Linnaeus. Rolander and Linnaeus had had a severe falling-out, one of the reasons for which was cited to be Rolander's refusal to submit his specimen collections from Suriname to Linnaeus. Linnaeus therefore named the species rolandri after him, while Aphanus derives from the Greek word "aphanis" ἀφανής, meaning hidden or obscure. It was intended as an insult to his student.

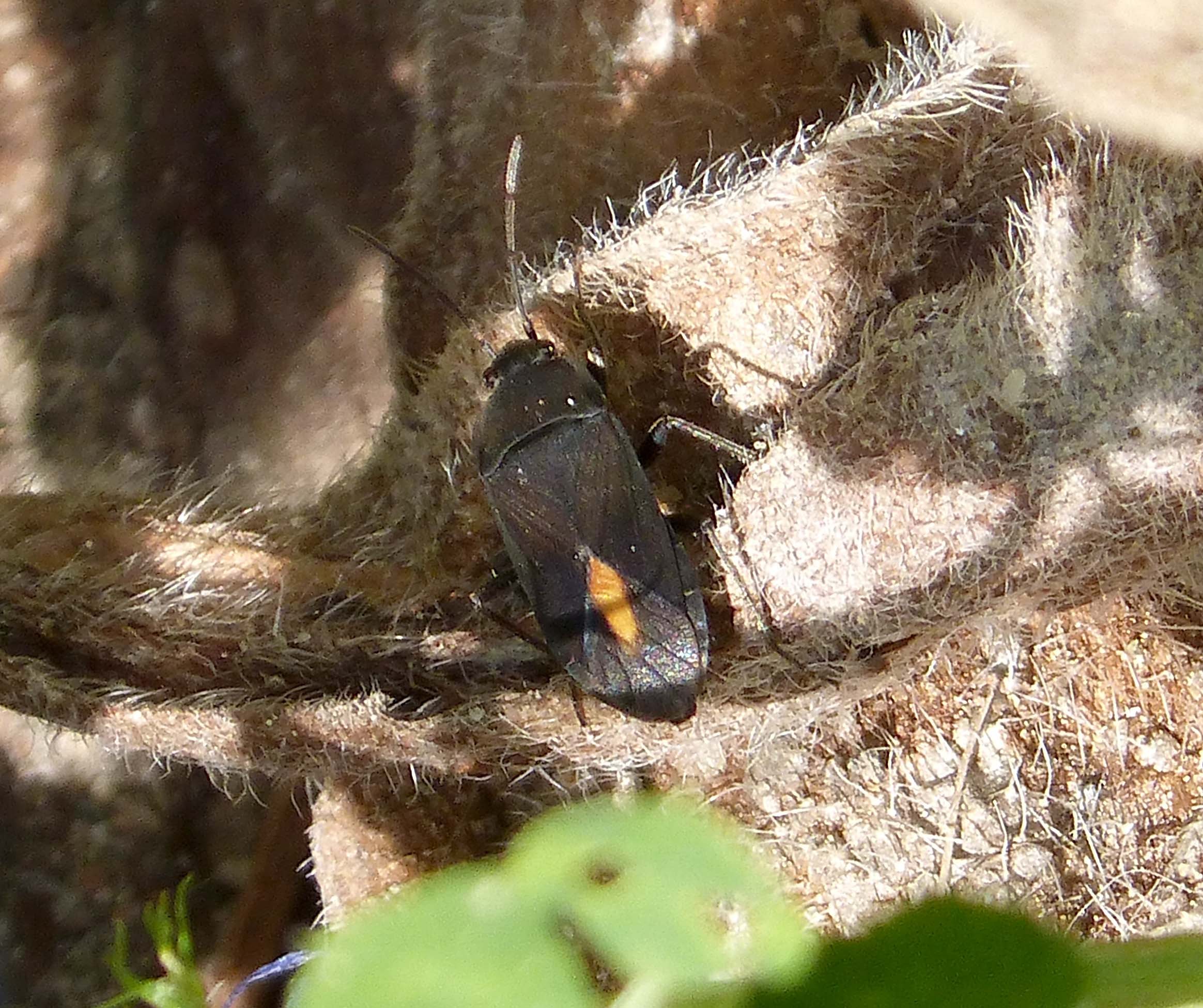
Aphanus rolandri

== Subspecies ==
These four subspecies belong to the species Aphanus rolandri:

- Aphanus rolandri angustulus (Reuter, 1880)
- Aphanus rolandri nitidulus (Reuter, 1885)
- Aphanus rolandri opacus (Reuter, 1885)
- Aphanus rolandri rolandri Linnaeus, 1758
