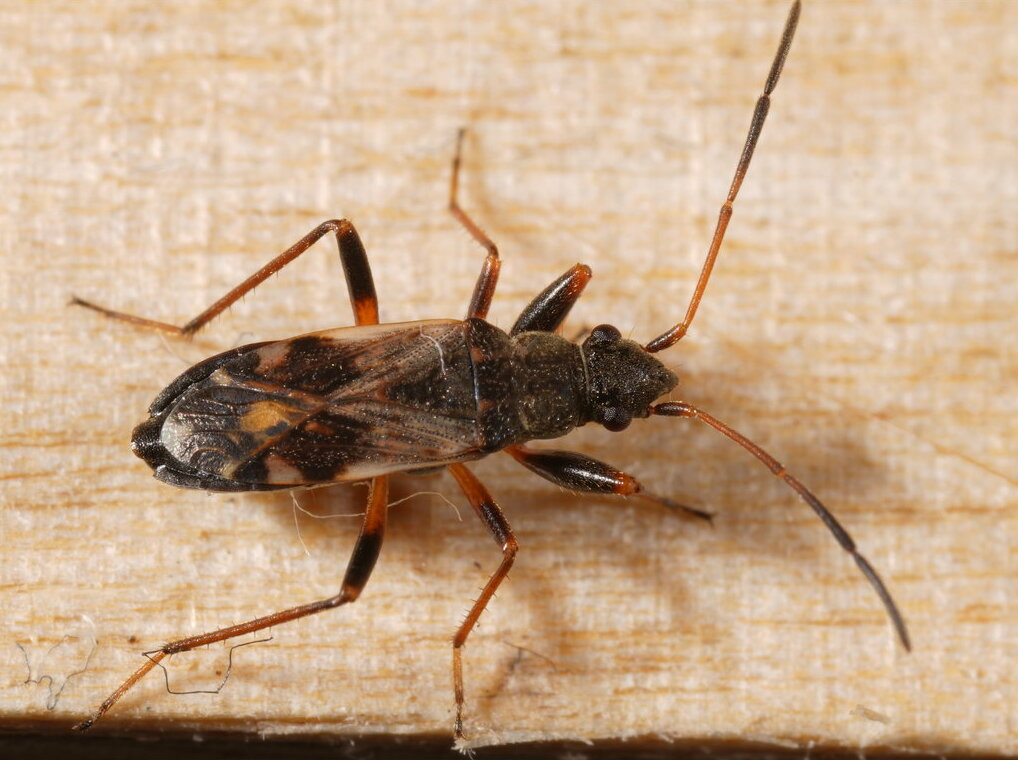

Scientific classification
- Kingdom: Animalia
- Phylum: Arthropoda
- Class: Insecta
- Order: Hemiptera
- Suborder: Heteroptera
- Family: Rhyparochromidae
- Genus: Ligyrocoris
- Species: L. sylvestris

Binomial name
- Ligyrocoris sylvestris (Linnaeus, 1758)

Synonyms
- Cimex sylvestris Linnaeus, 1758

= Ligyrocoris sylvestris =

Species of true bug

Ligyrocoris sylvestris is a species of dirt-colored seed bug in the family Rhyparochromidae. It is found in Africa, Europe and Northern Asia (excluding China), North America, and Southern Asia.
