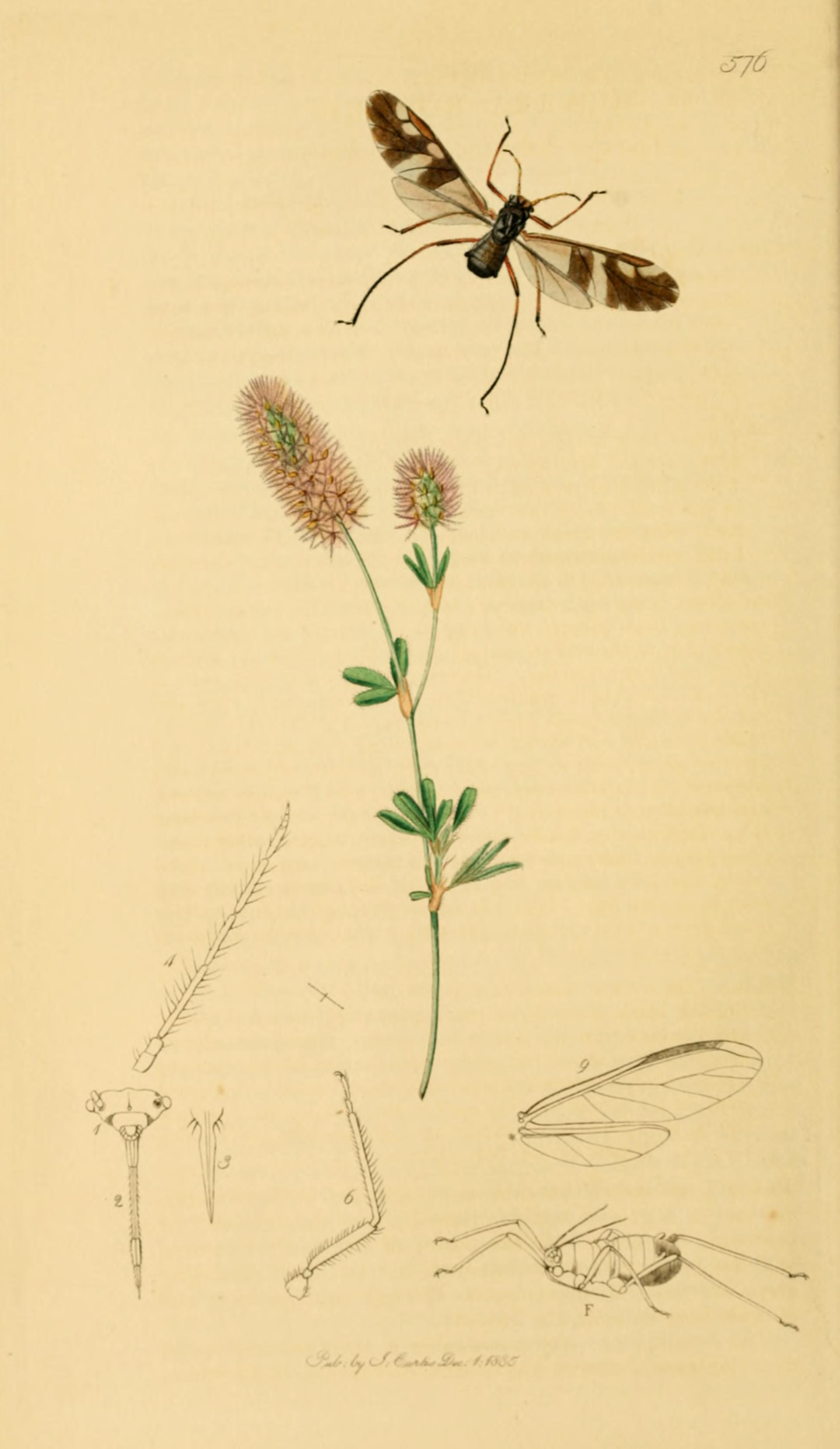

Scientific classification
- Domain: Eukaryota
- Kingdom: Animalia
- Phylum: Arthropoda
- Class: Insecta
- Order: Hemiptera
- Suborder: Sternorrhyncha
- Family: Aphididae
- Genus: Lachnus
- Species: L. roboris

Binomial name
- Lachnus roboris (Linnaeus, 1758)

= Lachnus roboris =

Species of true bug

Lachnus roboris is a species of insect belonging to the family Aphididae.

It is native to Europe.
