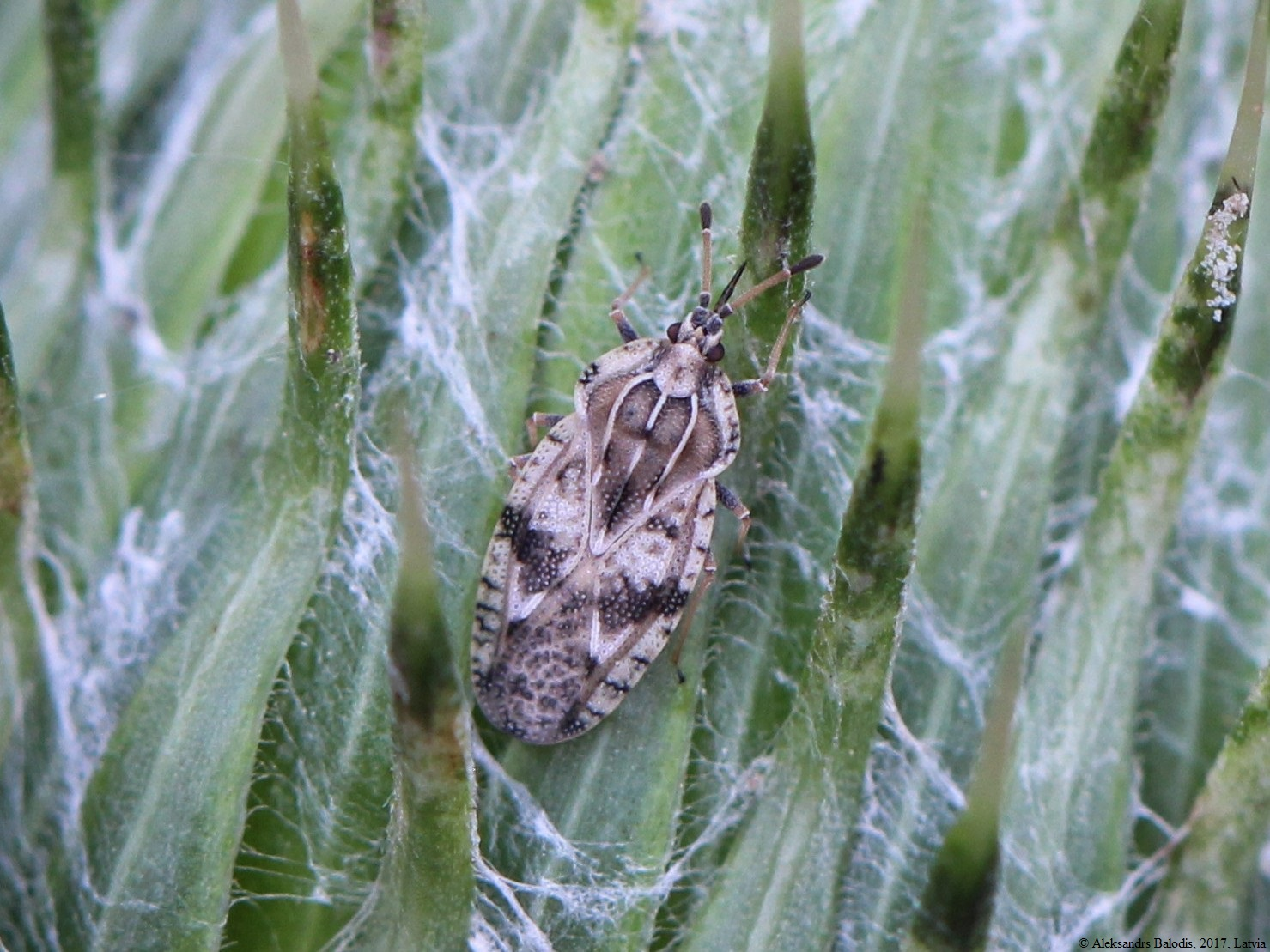

Scientific classification
- Kingdom: Animalia
- Phylum: Arthropoda
- Class: Insecta
- Order: Hemiptera
- Suborder: Heteroptera
- Family: Tingidae
- Genus: Tingis
- Species: T. cardui

Binomial name
- Tingis cardui (Linnaeus, 1758)

= Tingis cardui =

Species of true bug

Tingis cardui is a Palearctic lacewing bug. The species is widespread in almost all of Europe and lacking only in the far North. It is common also in North Africa and East Asia minor and the Middle East as well as southern Russia and the Caucasus to Siberia and the North of China. Tingis cardui lives on Cirsium, in particular on Cirsium vulgare, but also on Cirsium palustre and less frequently on Carduus nutans, Carduus crispus, and Carduus acanthoides. Overwintering occurs as an imago in the ground litter, or under loose bark. The bugs appear in April or May, and sit on the basal leaves of their food crops.

Some make dispersion flights to colonize new plants. Mating and oviposition lasts until July. The females drill their eggs individually on both sides of the leaves into the tissue of the food plant. The nymphs occur from June until September. Older nymphs are often located between the spines on the outside of the flower baskets or close to it. The adult animals of the new generation occur from late July or early August.
