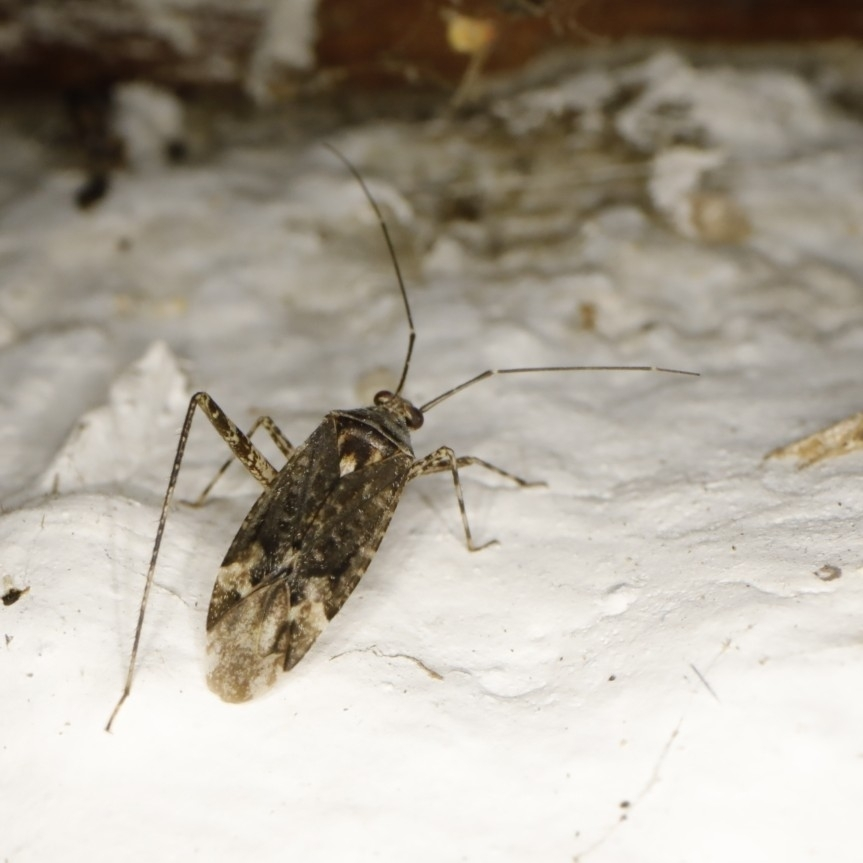
- Phytocoris populi, Suomi / Finland

Scientific classification
- Kingdom: Animalia
- Phylum: Arthropoda
- Class: Insecta
- Order: Hemiptera
- Suborder: Heteroptera
- Family: Miridae
- Genus: Phytocoris
- Species: P. populi

Binomial name
- Phytocoris populi (Linnaeus, 1758)

= Phytocoris populi =

Species of bug

Phytocoris populi is a species of plant bugs belonging to the family Miridae, subfamily Mirinae. It is widespread in Europe but absent from Albania, Andorra, Azores, Canary Islands, Cyprus, Faroe Islands and Iceland. then across the Palearctic to the Russian Far East and Siberia.

Phytocoris populi lives on various deciduous trees, especially on poplars ( Populus ) and willows (Salix ), more rarely on linden trees ( Tilia ), birches ( Betula ), alders ( Alnus ), ash trees ( Fraxinus ) or fruit trees. Both the nymphs and the imagines sit during the day predominantly in cracks of the bark on the trunk of the host plants. They feed predominantly as predators on aphids, psyllids, Psocoptera and other small invertebrates that live on the trunk of the plants. The adult bugs can be observed from July to September. They are very active in flight.
