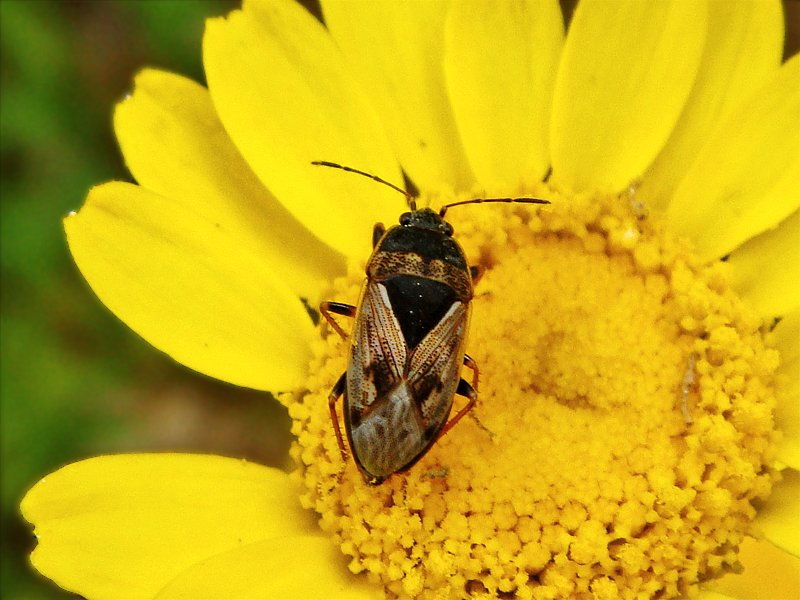

Scientific classification
- Kingdom: Animalia
- Phylum: Arthropoda
- Class: Insecta
- Order: Hemiptera
- Suborder: Heteroptera
- Family: Rhyparochromidae
- Genus: Trapezonotus
- Species: T. arenarius

Binomial name
- Trapezonotus arenarius (Linnaeus, 1758)

Synonyms
- Trapezonotus agrestis (Fallén, 1807)

= Trapezonotus arenarius =

Species of true bug

Trapezonotus arenarius is a species of dirt-colored seed bug in the family Rhyparochromidae. It is found in Africa, Europe and Northern Asia (excluding China), North America, and Southern Asia.

== Subspecies ==
These two subspecies belong to the species Trapezonotus arenarius:

- Trapezonotus arenarius arenarius Linnaeus & C., 1758^{c g}
- Trapezonotus arenarius elengantulus Kiritshenko, A.N. & G.G.E.Scudder, 1973^{c g}

Data sources: i = ITIS, c = Catalogue of Life, g = GBIF, b = Bugguide.net
