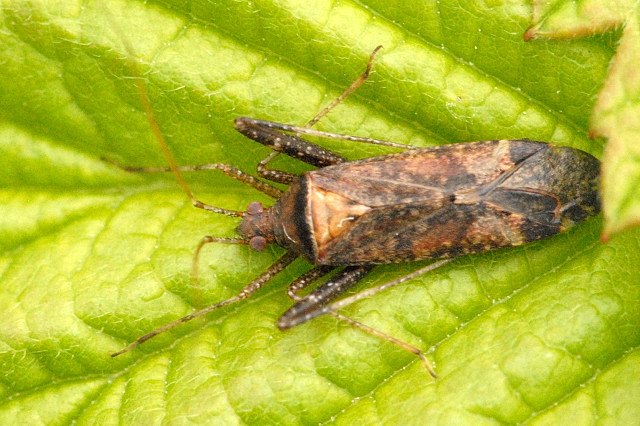

Scientific classification
- Kingdom: Animalia
- Phylum: Arthropoda
- Class: Insecta
- Order: Hemiptera
- Suborder: Heteroptera
- Family: Miridae
- Genus: Phytocoris
- Species: P. ulmi

Binomial name
- Phytocoris ulmi (Linnaeus, 1758)

= Phytocoris ulmi =

Species of true bug

Phytocoris ulmi is a species of plant bugs belonging to the family Miridae, subfamily Mirinae.

== Description ==
The species is brownish coloured and is 6–8 millimetres (0.24–0.31 in) long. Its 1st antennal segment is thin with the hairs being long.

== Distribution ==
Europe but it is mainly absent from Azores, Canary Islands, Cyprus, Faroe Islands, Greece, Iceland, Italy, Liechtenstein, Madeira, Malta, Portugal, and central part of Russia. To the east it extends to the Caucasus.

== Ecology ==
Phytocoris ulmi found in hedgerows and woods especially on hawthorn.
