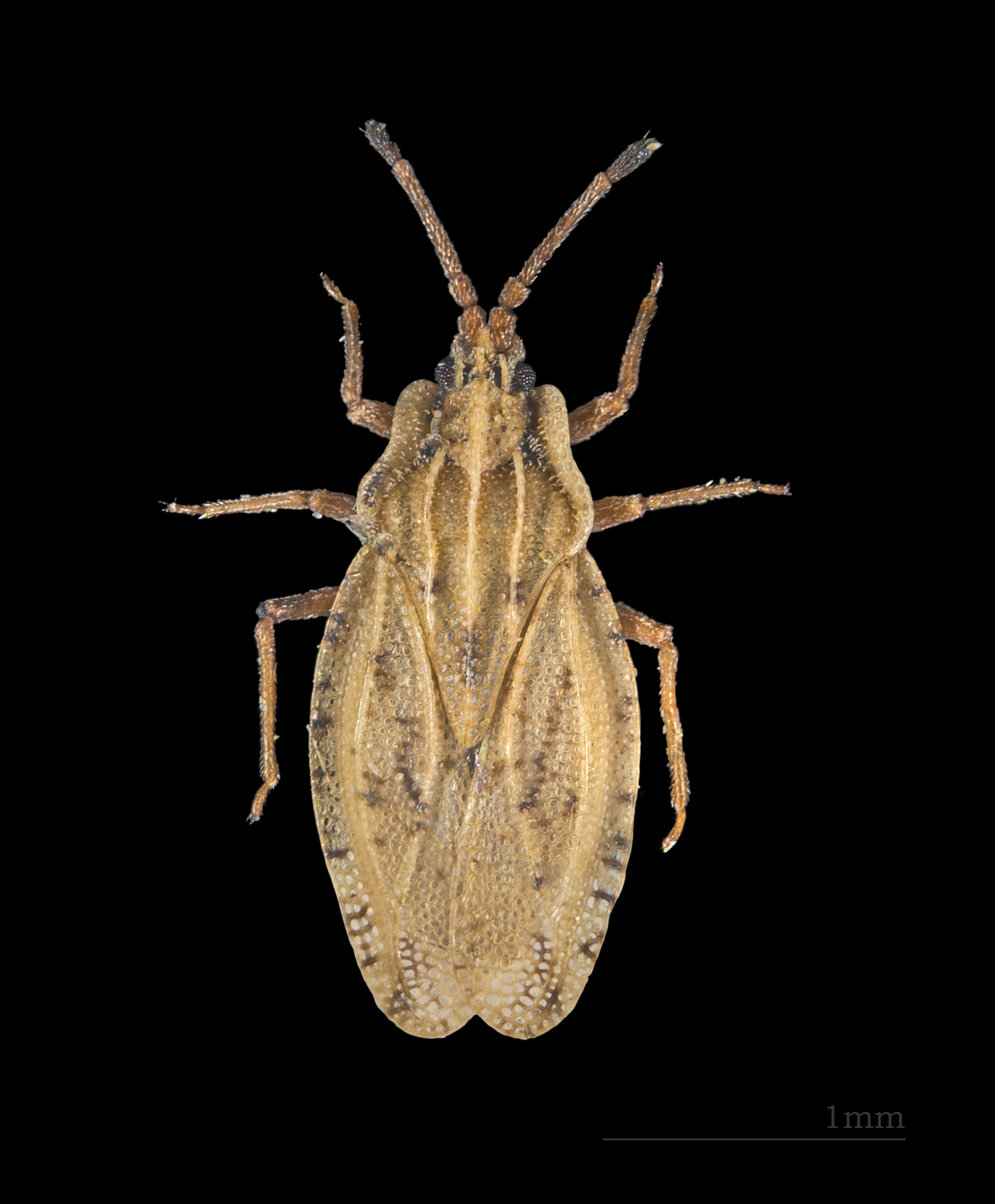
- Tingis auriculata

Scientific classification
- Domain: Eukaryota
- Kingdom: Animalia
- Phylum: Arthropoda
- Class: Insecta
- Order: Hemiptera
- Suborder: Heteroptera
- Family: Tingidae
- Tribe: Tingini
- Genus: Tingis; Fabricius, 1803

= Tingis (bug) =

Genus of true bugs

Tingis is a genus of lace bugs in the family Tingidae. There are at least 130 described species in Tingis.

== See also ==
- List of Tingis species
