= Cyrtomenus crassus =

Scientific classification
- Kingdom: Animalia
- Phylum: Arthropoda
- Class: Insecta
- Order: Hemiptera
- Suborder: Heteroptera
- Family: Cydnidae
- Tribe: Geotomini
- Genus: Cyrtomenus
- Species: C. crassus

Binomial name
- Cyrtomenus crassus Walker, 1867

Species of true bug

Cyrtomenus crassus is a species of burrowing bug in the family Cydnidae. It is found in the Caribbean Sea, Central America, and North America.
