= Rhytidoporus compactus =

Scientific classification
- Domain: Eukaryota
- Kingdom: Animalia
- Phylum: Arthropoda
- Class: Insecta
- Order: Hemiptera
- Suborder: Heteroptera
- Family: Cydnidae
- Tribe: Geotomini
- Genus: Rhytidoporus
- Species: R. compactus

Binomial name
- Rhytidoporus compactus (Uhler, 1877)

Species of true bug

Rhytidoporus compactus is a species of burrowing bug in the family Cydnidae. It is found in Central America and North America.
