= Melanaethus subpunctatus =

Scientific classification
- Domain: Eukaryota
- Kingdom: Animalia
- Phylum: Arthropoda
- Class: Insecta
- Order: Hemiptera
- Suborder: Heteroptera
- Family: Cydnidae
- Tribe: Geotomini
- Genus: Melanaethus
- Species: M. subpunctatus

Binomial name
- Melanaethus subpunctatus (Blatchley, 1926)

Species of true bug

Melanaethus subpunctatus is a species of burrowing bug in the family Cydnidae. It is found in North America.
