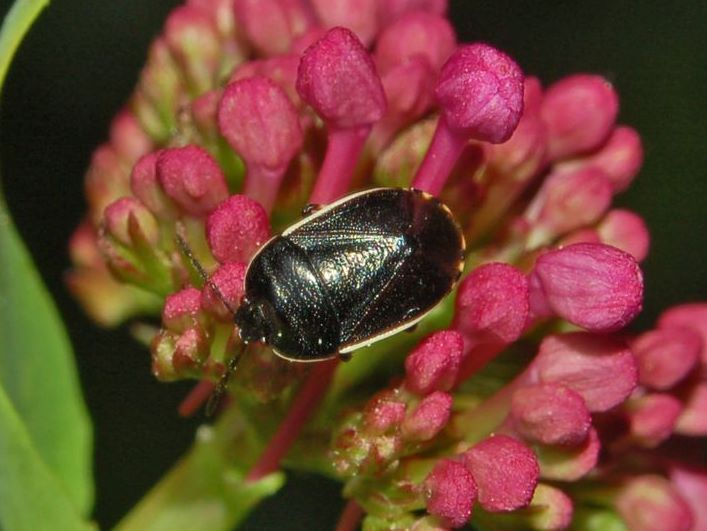
- Canthophorus dubius, upperside
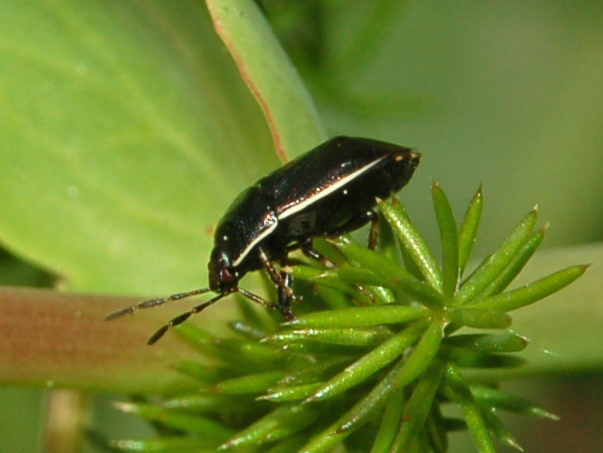
- Side view

Scientific classification
- Domain: Eukaryota
- Kingdom: Animalia
- Phylum: Arthropoda
- Class: Insecta
- Order: Hemiptera
- Suborder: Heteroptera
- Family: Cydnidae
- Subfamily: Sehirinae
- Genus: Canthophorus
- Species: C. dubius

Binomial name
- Canthophorus dubius (Scopoli, 1763)

Synonyms
- Cimex dubius (Scopoli, 1763); Cimex albomarginellus (Fabricius, 1794); Sehirus dubius (Scopoli, 1763); Canthophorus dubius (Mulsant and Rey 1866)

= Canthophorus dubius =

Species of true bug

Canthophorus dubius is a species of burrowing bug belonging to the family Cydnidae, subfamily Sehirinae.

== Distribution ==
This palearctic species is widespread in most of Europe, Asia and North Africa.

It was found in Albania, Algeria, Austria, Belgium, Bosnia and Herzegovina, Bulgaria, Croatia, Cyprus, Czech Republic, Egypt, Finland, France, Germany, United Kingdom, Greece, Hungary, Iran, Israel, Italy, Lithuania, Republic of Moldova, Poland, Romania, Russia (in the northwest of the Caucasus), Slovakia, Slovenia, Spain, Sweden, Switzerland, Syria, Turkey, Ukraine and former Yugoslavia.

== Habitat ==
These burrowing bugs inhabit grasslands and open dry-warm areas, in particular lime or sand-marshes. In the Alps you can find them up to over 1000 meters above sea level.

== Description ==
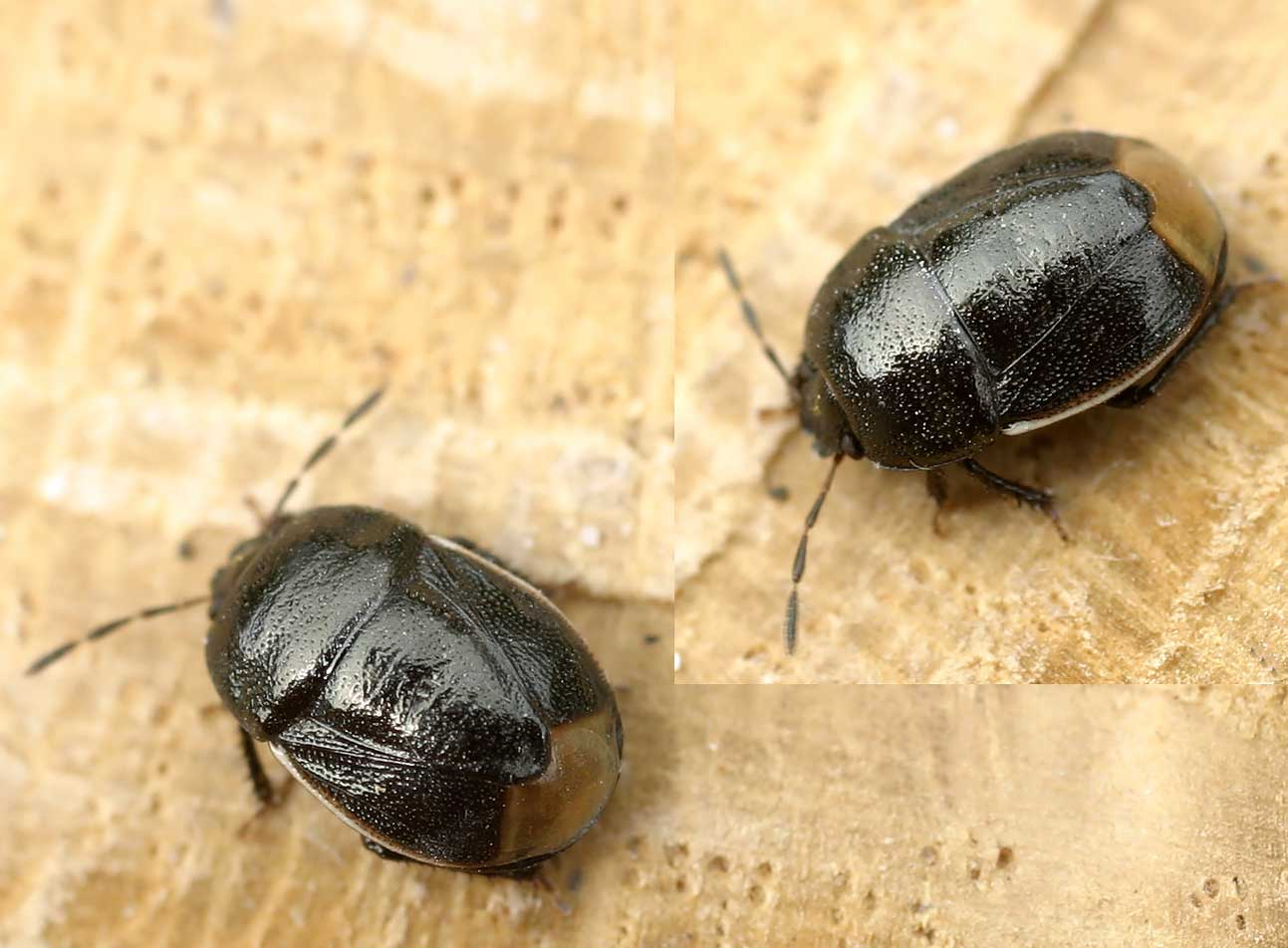
Canthophorus dubius

Canthophorus dubius can reach a length of 6–8 millimetres (0.24–0.31 in) and a width of 3.5–4.5 millimetres (0.14–0.18 in).

The body of these shieldbugs is oval, black or dark blue, sometimes metallic green or bright violet. The margins to the pronotum and corium of the hemielytra are white. Antennae are black with the second segment smaller than third. The legs are black. Membrane of the hemielytra is whitish and connexivum shows white bands.

This species is very similar to Canthophorus impressus. A certain identification requires dissection.

== Biology ==
There is one generation per year. The overwintering occurs as an adult bug under foliage and in moss near the host plants. The mating takes place in May and June. The nymphs appear from June to August, the new generation of adults from July.

Adults and larvae are trophically associated with Thesium species (Thesium alpinum, Thesium linophyllon and Thesium pyrenaicum), more rarely with other plants: wormwood (Artemisia), mint (Salvia), thyme (Thymus) etc.
