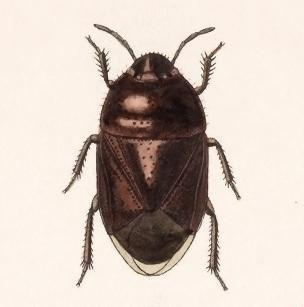

Scientific classification
- Domain: Eukaryota
- Kingdom: Animalia
- Phylum: Arthropoda
- Class: Insecta
- Order: Hemiptera
- Suborder: Heteroptera
- Family: Cydnidae
- Tribe: Geotomini
- Genus: Rhytidoporus
- Species: R. indentatus

Binomial name
- Rhytidoporus indentatus Uhler, 1877

= Rhytidoporus indentatus =

Species of insect

Rhytidoporus indentatus is a species of burrowing bug in the family Cydnidae. It is found in the Caribbean, North America, and Oceania.
