= Dallasiellus lugubris =

Scientific classification
- Kingdom: Animalia
- Phylum: Arthropoda
- Clade: Pancrustacea
- Class: Insecta
- Order: Hemiptera
- Suborder: Heteroptera
- Family: Cydnidae
- Tribe: Geotomini
- Genus: Dallasiellus
- Species: D. lugubris

Binomial name
- Dallasiellus lugubris (Stål, 1860)

Species of true bug

Dallasiellus lugubris is a species of burrowing bug in the family Cydnidae. It is found in the Caribbean Sea, Central America, North America, and South America.
