= Tominotus unisetosus =

Scientific classification
- Domain: Eukaryota
- Kingdom: Animalia
- Phylum: Arthropoda
- Class: Insecta
- Order: Hemiptera
- Suborder: Heteroptera
- Family: Cydnidae
- Tribe: Geotomini
- Genus: Tominotus
- Species: T. unisetosus

Binomial name
- Tominotus unisetosus Froeschner, 1960

Species of true bug

Tominotus unisetosus is a species of burrowing bug in the family Cydnidae. It is found in Central America and North America.
