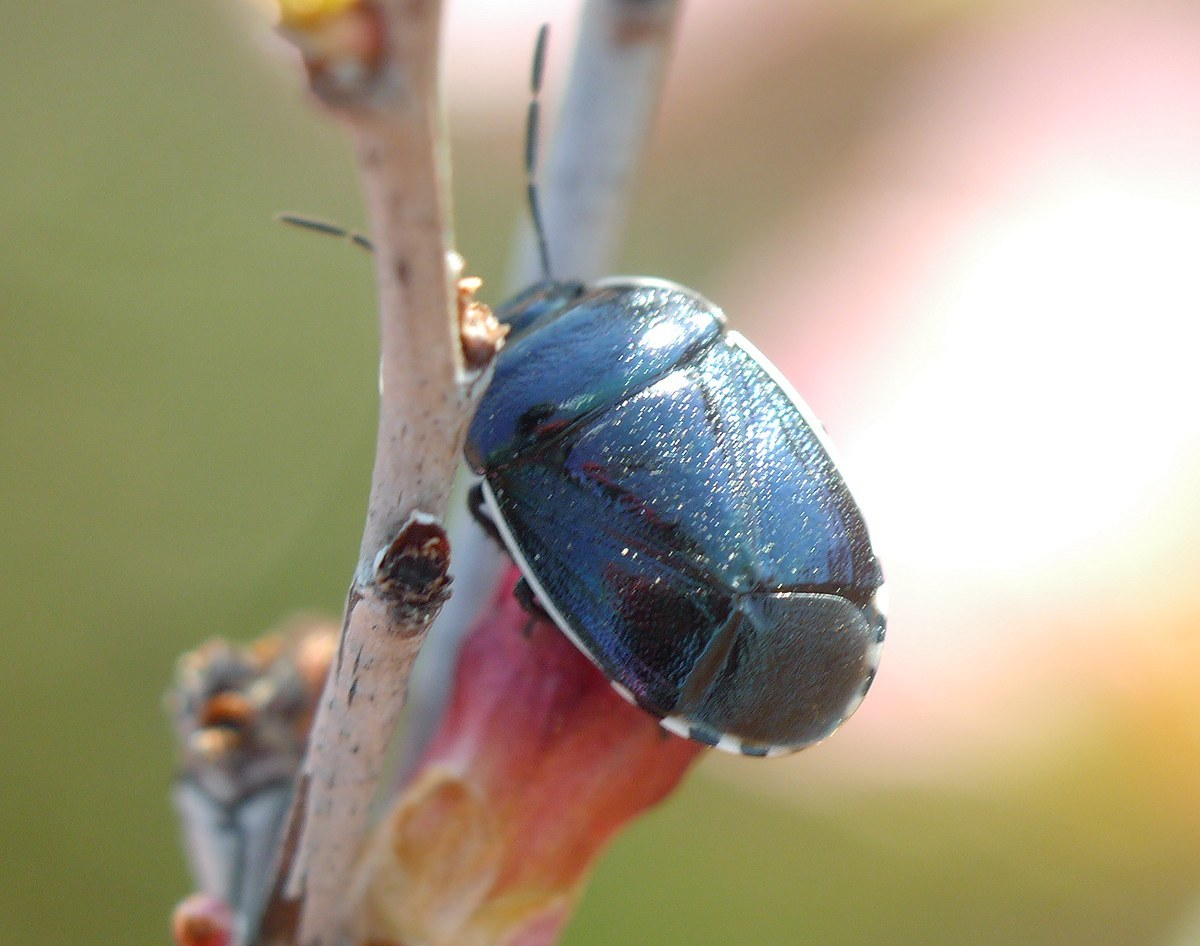
- Canthophorus melanopterus, Ukraine

Scientific classification
- Kingdom: Animalia
- Phylum: Arthropoda
- Class: Insecta
- Order: Hemiptera
- Suborder: Heteroptera
- Family: Cydnidae
- Subfamily: Sehirinae
- Genus: Canthophorus; Mulsant & Rey, 1866

Synonyms
- Sehirus Amyot & Serville, 1843

= Canthophorus =

Genus of insects

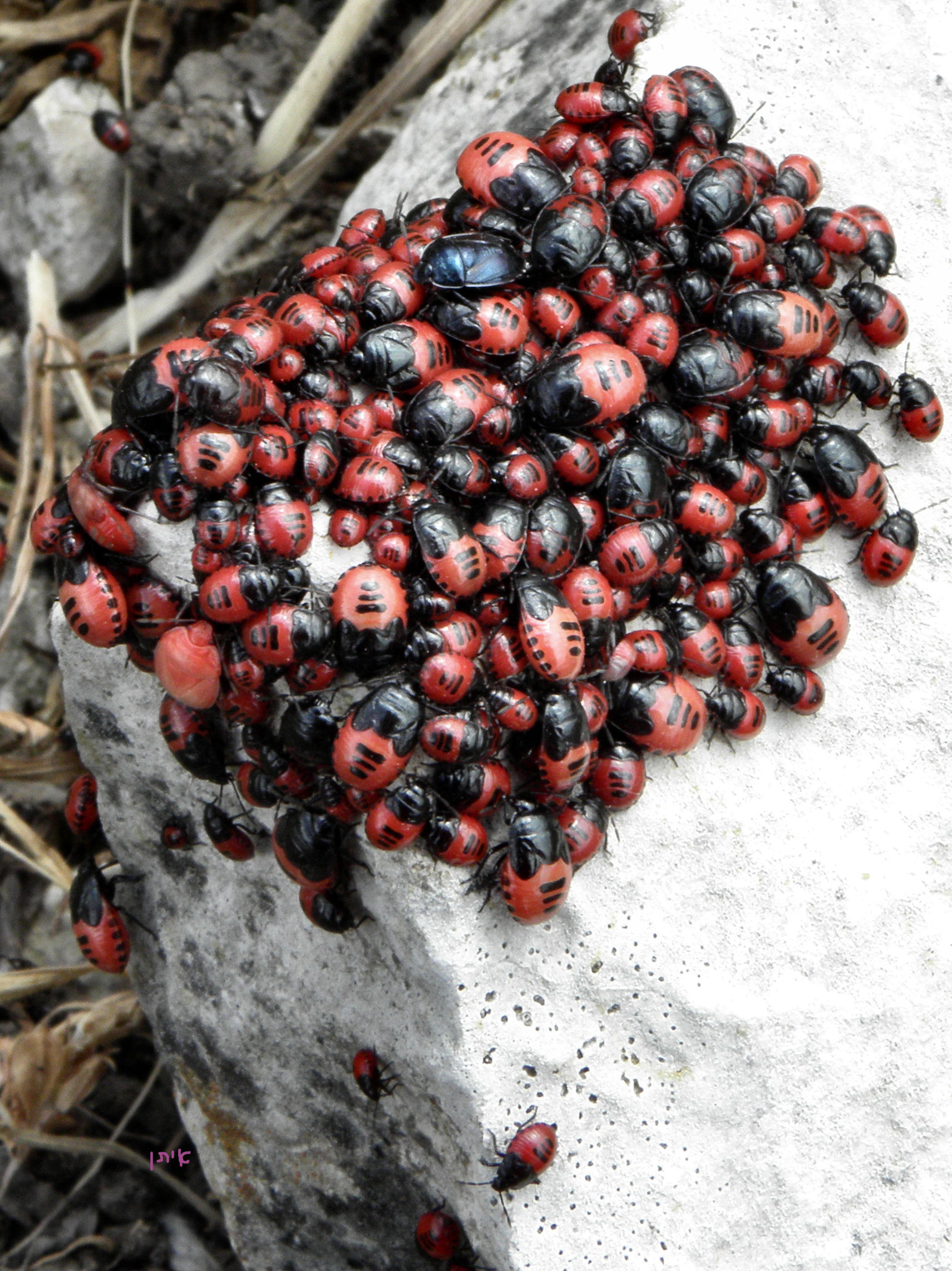
Canthophorus melanopterus

Canthophorus is a genus of burrowing bugs in the family Cydnidae. There are about eight described species in Canthophorus.

Species of this genus were formerly considered to be members of the genus Sehirus.

== Species ==
These eight species belong to the genus Canthophorus:

- Canthophorus coeruleus (Reuter, 1902)
- Canthophorus dubius (Scopoli, 1763)
- Canthophorus impressus (Horváth, 1881)
- Canthophorus melanopterus (Herrich-Schäffer, 1835)
- Canthophorus mixtus Asanova, 1964
- Canthophorus niveimarginatus Scott, 1874
- Canthophorus spec (Horvath, 1881)
- Canthophorus wagneri Asanova, 1964
