= Tominotus communis =

Scientific classification
- Domain: Eukaryota
- Kingdom: Animalia
- Phylum: Arthropoda
- Class: Insecta
- Order: Hemiptera
- Suborder: Heteroptera
- Family: Cydnidae
- Tribe: Geotomini
- Genus: Tominotus
- Species: T. communis

Binomial name
- Tominotus communis (Uhler, 1877)

Species of true bug

Tominotus communis is a species of burrowing bug in the family Cydnidae. It is found in the Caribbean Sea, Central America, and North America.
