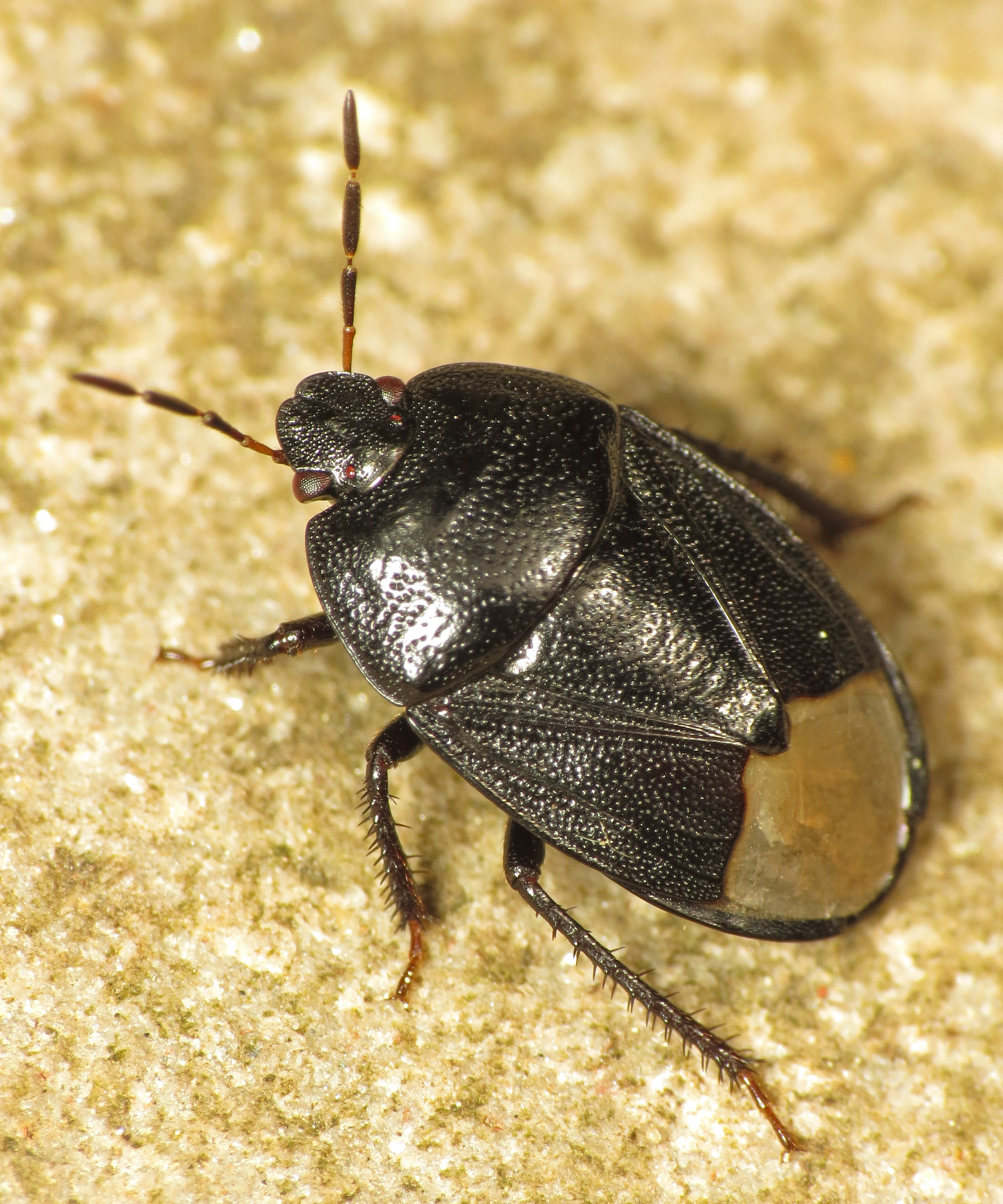

Scientific classification
- Domain: Eukaryota
- Kingdom: Animalia
- Phylum: Arthropoda
- Class: Insecta
- Order: Hemiptera
- Suborder: Heteroptera
- Family: Cydnidae
- Subfamily: Sehirinae
- Genus: Sehirus
- Species: S. luctuosus

Binomial name
- Sehirus luctuosus Mulsant & Rey, 1866

= Sehirus luctuosus =

Species of true bug

Sehirus luctuosus, the Forget-me-not Bug, is a burrowing shieldbug belonging to the family Cydnidae. It is found from Europe to Central Asia.In Central Europe it is widespread and not uncommon. They are found in the Alps on sunny slopes up to almost 2000 meters above sea level.

Adults are 6.2 to 8.3 millimeters long. They are completely black in colour and only sometimes have a bronze sheen. The second antennal segment (pedicellus) is much paler than the rest.

Sehirus luctuosus feeds on species of Anchusa. Echium vulgare, forget-me-nots Myosotis and species of violets including Viola riviniana. Pairing is at the end of April and in May. During this time the imagines are found running and flying on many different plant species. Nymphs are found on the ground below the food crops. The nymphs occur primarily in June and July, the adult animals of the new generation from late July or August. There is one generation per year.
