= Melanaethus pensylvanicus =

Scientific classification
- Domain: Eukaryota
- Kingdom: Animalia
- Phylum: Arthropoda
- Class: Insecta
- Order: Hemiptera
- Suborder: Heteroptera
- Family: Cydnidae
- Tribe: Geotomini
- Genus: Melanaethus
- Species: M. pensylvanicus

Binomial name
- Melanaethus pensylvanicus (Signoret, 1883)

Species of true bug

Melanaethus pensylvanicus is a species of burrowing bug in the family Cydnidae. It is found in North America.
