= Cyrtomenus ciliatus =

Scientific classification
- Domain: Eukaryota
- Kingdom: Animalia
- Phylum: Arthropoda
- Class: Insecta
- Order: Hemiptera
- Suborder: Heteroptera
- Family: Cydnidae
- Tribe: Geotomini
- Genus: Cyrtomenus
- Species: C. ciliatus

Binomial name
- Cyrtomenus ciliatus (Palisot, 1818)

Synonyms
- Cyrtomenus castaneus Amyot and Serville, 1843

Species of true bug

Cyrtomenus ciliatus is a species of burrowing bug in the family Cydnidae. It is found in North America.
