= Melanaethus noctivagus =

Scientific classification
- Domain: Eukaryota
- Kingdom: Animalia
- Phylum: Arthropoda
- Class: Insecta
- Order: Hemiptera
- Suborder: Heteroptera
- Family: Cydnidae
- Tribe: Geotomini
- Genus: Melanaethus
- Species: M. noctivagus

Binomial name
- Melanaethus noctivagus (Van Duzee, 1923)

Species of true bug

Melanaethus noctivagus is a species of burrowing bug in the family Cydnidae. It is found in Central America and North America.
