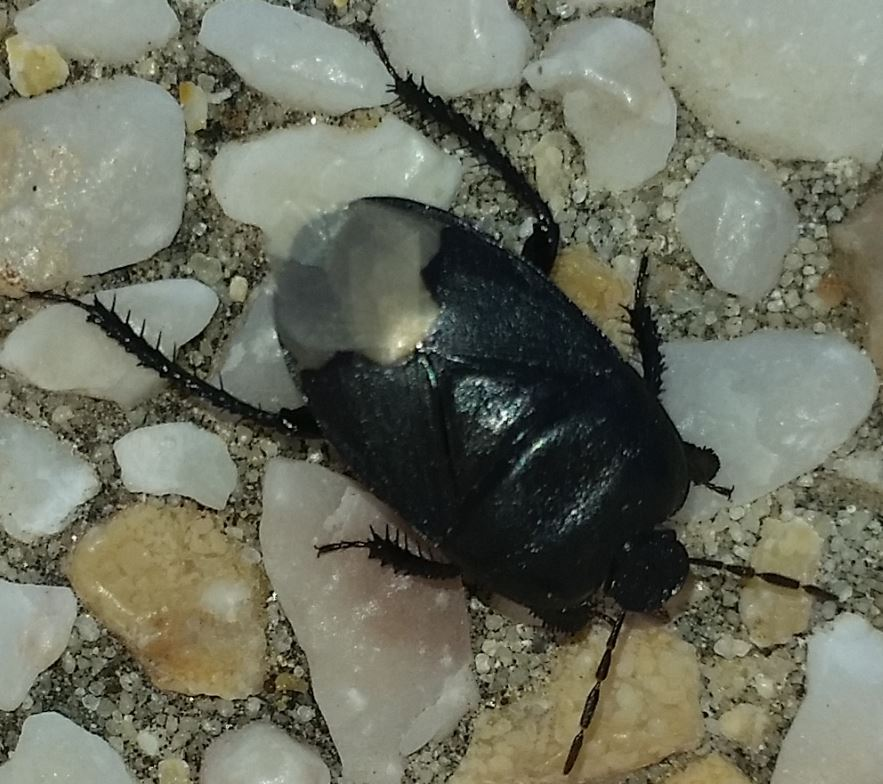

Scientific classification
- Domain: Eukaryota
- Kingdom: Animalia
- Phylum: Arthropoda
- Class: Insecta
- Order: Hemiptera
- Suborder: Heteroptera
- Family: Cydnidae
- Tribe: Cydnini
- Genus: Cydnus
- Species: C. aterrimus

Binomial name
- Cydnus aterrimus (Forster, 1771)

Synonyms
- Cydnus tristis Fabricius, 1803

= Cydnus aterrimus =

Species of true bug

Cydnus aterrimus is a species of burrowing bug in the family Cydnidae. It is found in the Caribbean, Europe and Northern Asia (excluding China), North America, and Southern Asia.

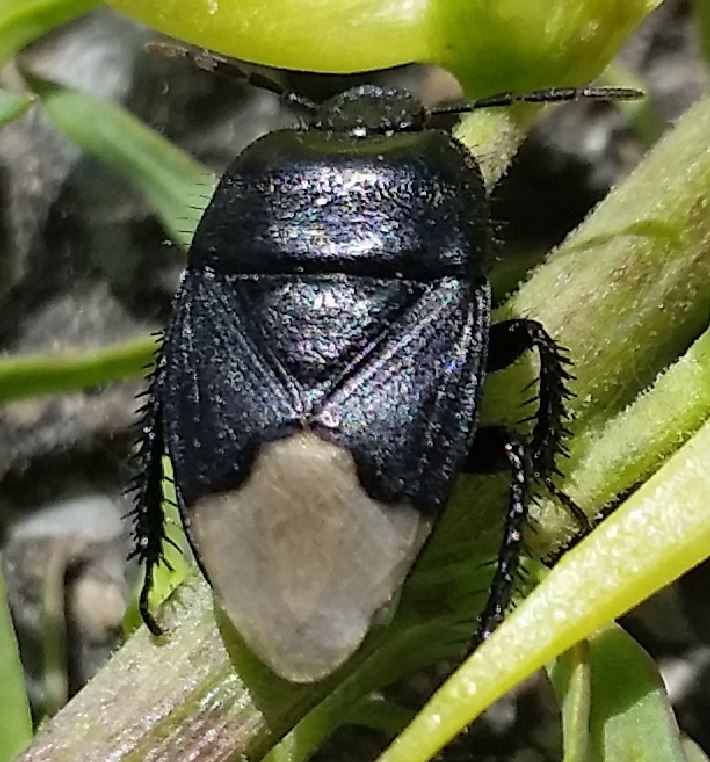

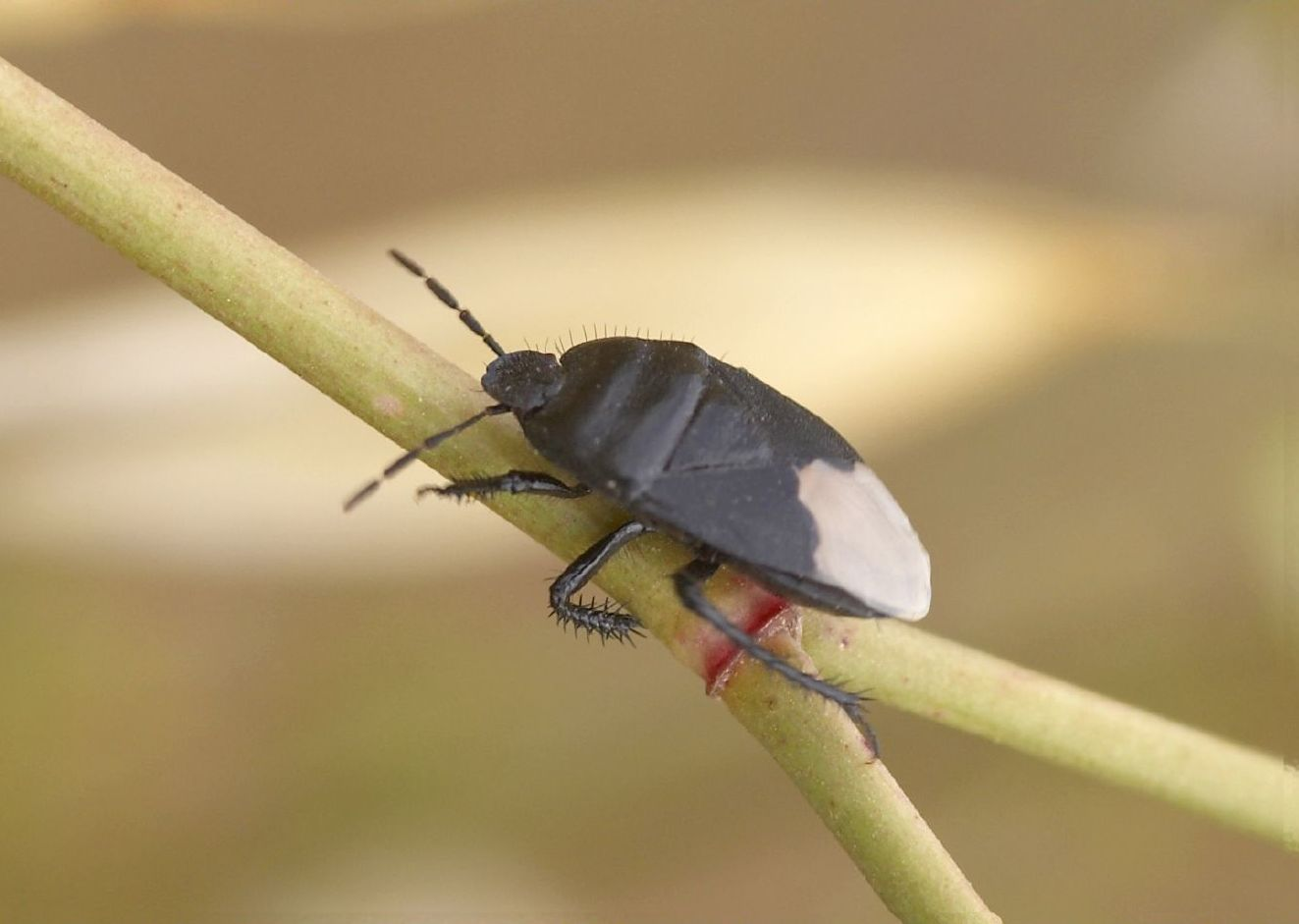
