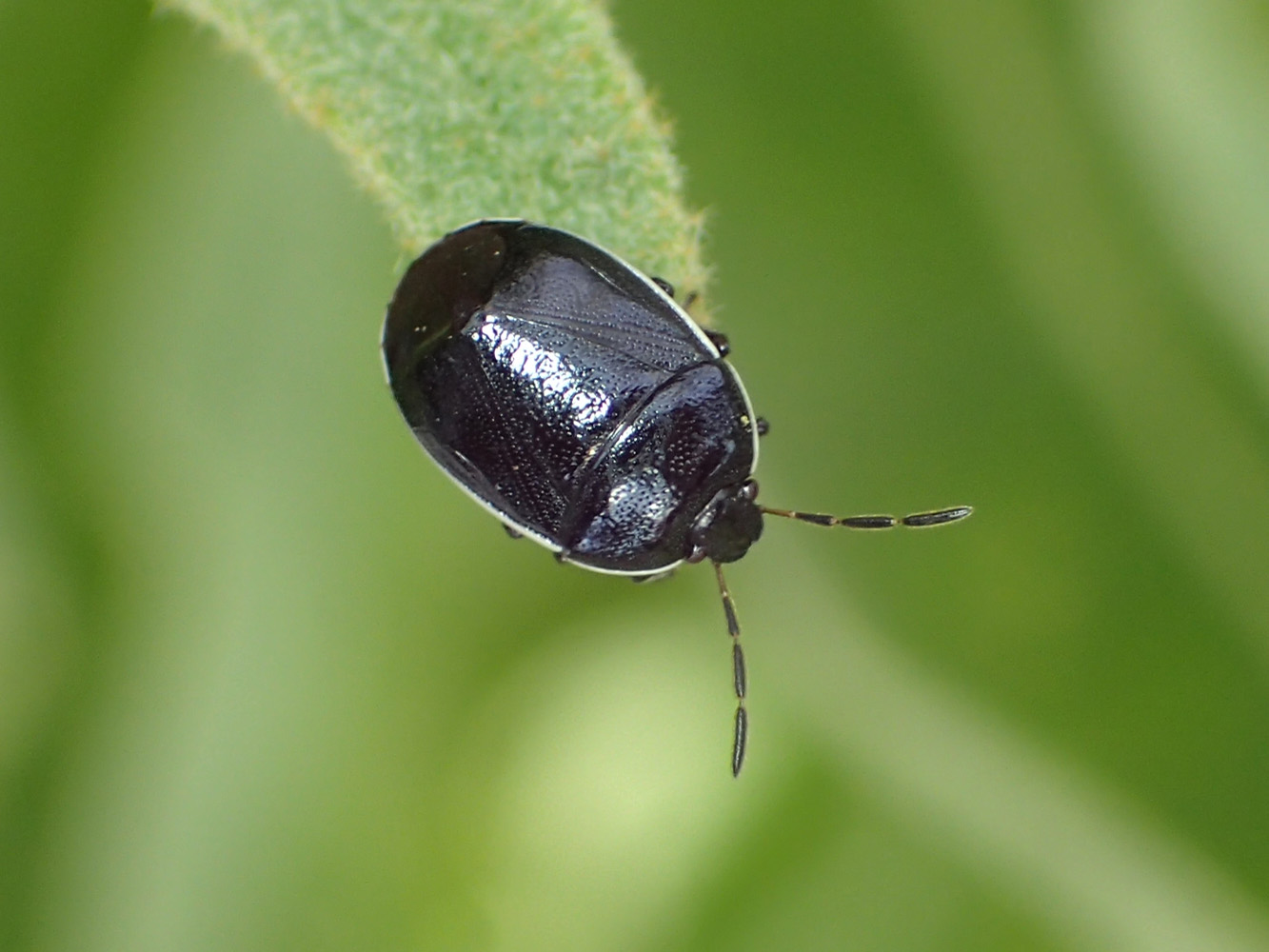
- Sehirus cinctus

Scientific classification
- Domain: Eukaryota
- Kingdom: Animalia
- Phylum: Arthropoda
- Class: Insecta
- Order: Hemiptera
- Suborder: Heteroptera
- Family: Cydnidae
- Subfamily: Sehirinae
- Genus: Sehirus
- Species: S. cinctus

Binomial name
- Sehirus cinctus (Palisot, 1811)

= Sehirus cinctus =

Species of true bug

Sehirus cinctus, also known as the white-margined burrower bug, is within the genus of burrowing bugs belonging to the family Cydnidae, subfamily Sehirinae. Belonging to the suborder Heteroptera, they are true bugs. They feed on plants in the Urticaceae (nettle) and Lamiaceae (mint) families. These bugs are somewhat unusual in that they exhibit brooding behavior. The female deposits eggs, about 120–150, in shallow burrows and watches over them. After the young hatch, the mother will bring food to them in the burrow for 1–3 days, after which the young will leave and forage on their own. Females can have up to two broods, and parental care is initiated from chemical cues in the eggs.
