= Geotomus =

Scientific classification
- Domain: Eukaryota
- Kingdom: Animalia
- Phylum: Arthropoda
- Class: Insecta
- Order: Hemiptera
- Suborder: Heteroptera
- Family: Cydnidae
- Tribe: Geotomini
- Genus: Geotomus; Mulsant & Rey, 1866

Genus of insects

Geotomus is a genus of true bugs belonging to the family Cydnidae.

The species of this genus are found in Eurasia and Northern America.

Species:

- Geotomus alexandria (Distant, 1911)
- Geotomus angustus Wagner, 1953
- Geotomus antennatus Signoret, 1883
- Geotomus brunnipennis Wagner, 1953
- Geotomus ciliatitylus Signoret, 1881
- Geotomus convexus
- Geotomus elongatus (Herrich-Schäffer, 1840)
- Geotomus jucundus Buchanan White, 1877
- Geotomus longicornis Wagner, 1953
- Geotomus palustris
- Geotomus petiti Wagner, 1954
- Geotomus proximus Signoret, 1883
- Geotomus punctulatus (Costa, 1847)
- Geotomus radialis
- Geotomus regnieri Vidal, 1937
- Geotomus subtristis Buchanan White, 1877
