= Melanaethus =

Scientific classification
- Domain: Eukaryota
- Kingdom: Animalia
- Phylum: Arthropoda
- Class: Insecta
- Order: Hemiptera
- Suborder: Heteroptera
- Family: Cydnidae
- Subfamily: Cydninae
- Tribe: Geotomini
- Genus: Melanaethus; Uhler, 1876

Genus of true bugs

Melanaethus is a genus of burrowing bugs in the family Cydnidae. There are about 15 described species in Melanaethus.

== Species ==
These 15 species belong to the genus Melanaethus:

- Melanaethus anthracinus (Uhler, 1877)
- Melanaethus cavicollis (Blatchley, 1924)
- Melanaethus crenatus (Signoret, 1883)
- Melanaethus externus Froeschner
- Melanaethus mixtus Froeschner
- Melanaethus noctivagus (Van Duzee, 1923)
- Melanaethus pensylvanicus (Signoret, 1883)
- Melanaethus planifrons Froeschner, 1960
- Melanaethus punctatissimus (Signoret, 1883)
- Melanaethus robustus Uhler, 1877
- Melanaethus spinolae (Signoret, 1863)
- Melanaethus subglaber (Walker, 1867)
- Melanaethus subpunctatus (Blatchley, 1926)
- Melanaethus uhleri (Signoret, 1883)
- Melanaethus wolcotti Froeschner & Maldonado
