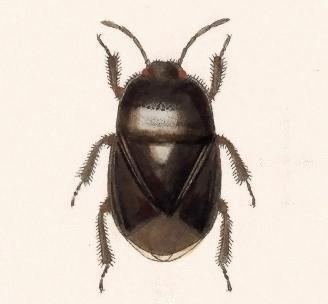
- Cyrtomenus grossus

Scientific classification
- Domain: Eukaryota
- Kingdom: Animalia
- Phylum: Arthropoda
- Class: Insecta
- Order: Hemiptera
- Suborder: Heteroptera
- Family: Cydnidae
- Subfamily: Cydninae
- Tribe: Geotomini
- Genus: Cyrtomenus; Amyot & Serville, 1843

Subgenera
- Cyrtomenus (Cyrtomenus) Amyot & Serville, 1843; Cyrtomenus (Syllobus) Signoret, 1879

= Cyrtomenus =

Genus of true bugs

Cyrtomenus is a genus of burrowing bugs in the family Cydnidae. There are about nine described species in Cyrtomenus.

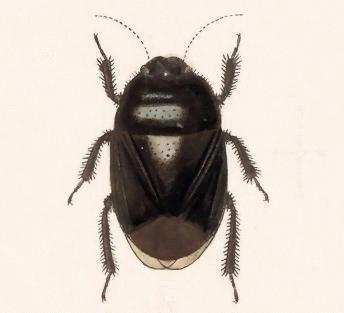
Cyrtomenus teter

== Species ==
These nine species belong to the genus Cyrtomenus:

- Cyrtomenus bergi Froeschner
- Cyrtomenus ciliatus (Palisot, 1818)
- Cyrtomenus crassus Walker, 1867
- Cyrtomenus emarginatus Stal, 1862
- Cyrtomenus grossus Dallas
- Cyrtomenus marginalis
- Cyrtomenus mirabilis
- Cyrtomenus teter Spinola
- † Cyrtomenus concinnus Scudder, 1878
