= Dallasiellus =

Scientific classification
- Domain: Eukaryota
- Kingdom: Animalia
- Phylum: Arthropoda
- Class: Insecta
- Order: Hemiptera
- Suborder: Heteroptera
- Family: Cydnidae
- Subfamily: Cydninae
- Tribe: Geotomini
- Genus: Dallasiellus; Berg, 1901

Subgenera
- Dallasiellus (Dallasiellus) Berg, 1901; Dallasiellus (Pseudopangaeus) Froeschner, 1960

Genus of true bugs

Dallasiellus is a genus of burrowing bugs in the family Cydnidae. There are about 18 described species in Dallasiellus.

== Species ==
These 18 species belong to the genus Dallasiellus:

- Dallasiellus americanus^{g}
- Dallasiellus californicus (Blatchley, 1929)^{i c g}
- Dallasiellus discrepans (Uhler, 1877)^{i c g}
- Dallasiellus foratus^{g}
- Dallasiellus horvathi^{g}
- Dallasiellus interruptus^{g}
- Dallasiellus leurus^{g}
- Dallasiellus levipennis^{g}
- Dallasiellus longirostris^{g}
- Dallasiellus longulus (Dallas, 1851)^{i c g}
- Dallasiellus lugubris (Stål, 1860)^{i c g b}
- Dallasiellus megalocephalus Froeschner, 1960^{g}
- Dallasiellus planicollis^{g}
- Dallasiellus puncticeps^{g}
- Dallasiellus puncticoria Froeschner, 1960^{i c g}
- Dallasiellus solitaria^{g}
- Dallasiellus varaderensis Marrero & Martinez, 2014
- Dallasiellus vanduzeei Froeschner, 1960^{i c g}
- Dallasiellus viduus^{g}

Data sources: i = ITIS, c = Catalogue of Life, g = GBIF, b = Bugguide.net
