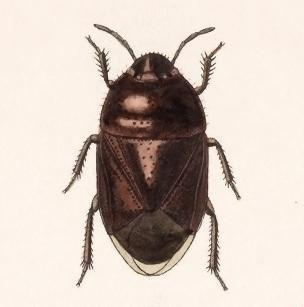
- Rhytidoporus indentatus

Scientific classification
- Domain: Eukaryota
- Kingdom: Animalia
- Phylum: Arthropoda
- Class: Insecta
- Order: Hemiptera
- Suborder: Heteroptera
- Family: Cydnidae
- Subfamily: Cydninae
- Tribe: Geotomini
- Genus: Rhytidoporus; Uhler, 1877

Subgenera
- Rhytidoporus (Bergthora) Kirkaldy, 1904; Rhytidoporus (Rhytidoporus) Uhler, 1877

= Rhytidoporus =

Genus of true bugs

Rhytidoporus is a genus of burrowing bugs in the family Cydnidae. There are at least three described species in Rhytidoporus.

== Species ==
These three species belong to the genus Rhytidoporus:

- Rhytidoporus barberi Froeschner
- Rhytidoporus compactus (Uhler, 1877)
- Rhytidoporus indentatus Uhler, 1877
