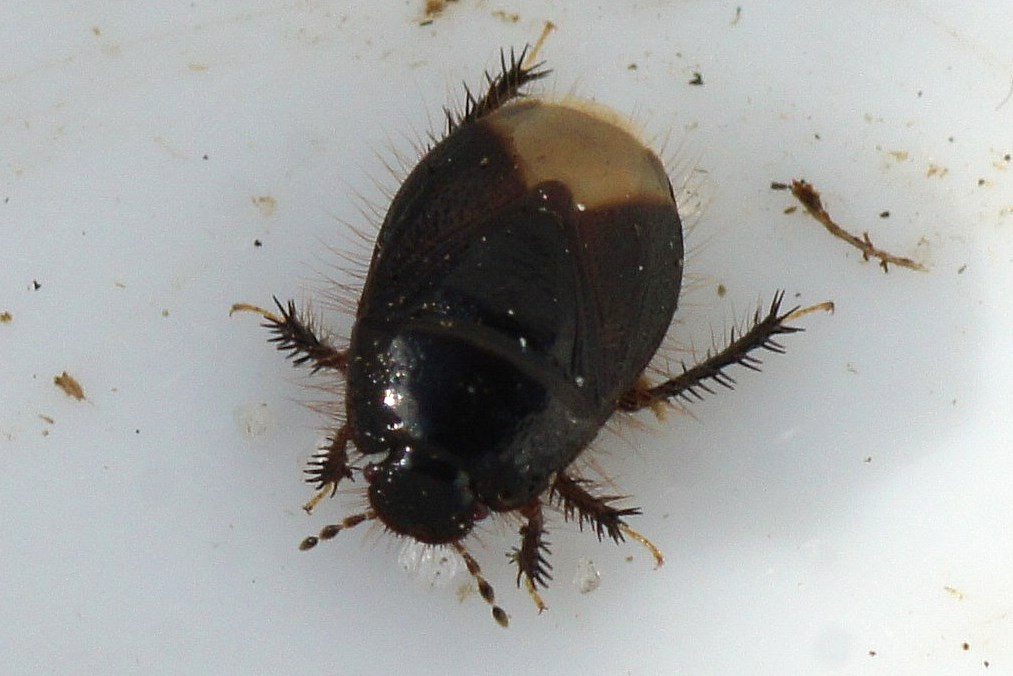
- Byrsinus flavicornis

Scientific classification
- Domain: Eukaryota
- Kingdom: Animalia
- Phylum: Arthropoda
- Class: Insecta
- Order: Hemiptera
- Suborder: Heteroptera
- Family: Cydnidae
- Subfamily: Cydninae
- Tribe: Geotomini
- Genus: Byrsinus; Fieber, 1860

Synonyms
- Putonisca Horváth, 1919

= Byrsinus =

Genus of true bugs

Byrsinus is a genus of burrowing bugs in the tribe Geotomini, erected by Franz Xaver Fieber in 1860. The species Byrsinus flavicornis is recorded from northern Europe including the British Isles.

== Species ==
According to BioLib the following are included: (Note: some authorities divide species int two subgenera: Byrsinus Fieber, 1860 and Psammozetus Mulsant & Rey, 1866)

1. Byrsinus albipennis (A. Costa, 1853)
2. Byrsinus australis Lis, 2001
3. Byrsinus azrak Linnavuori, 1993
4. Byrsinus balcanicus (Josifov, 1986)
5. Byrsinus brevicornis Wagner, 1964
6. Byrsinus comaroffii (Jakovlev, 1879)
7. Byrsinus cristatus (Jeannel, 1914)
8. Byrsinus discus Jakovlev, 1906
9. Byrsinus flavicornis (Fabricius, 1794)
10. Byrsinus fossor (Mulsant & Rey, 1866)
11. Byrsinus laeviceps (Kerzhner, 1972)
12. Byrsinus laticollis (Wagner, 1954)
13. Byrsinus minor Wagner, 1964
14. Byrsinus multitrichus Lis, 2001
15. Byrsinus nigroscutellatus (Montandon, 1900)
16. Byrsinus ochraceus (Distant, 1899)
17. Byrsinus pallidus (Puton, 1887)
18. Byrsinus pauculus (Signoret, 1882)
19. Byrsinus penicillatus Wagner, 1964
20. Byrsinus pevtzovi Jakovlev, 1903
21. Byrsinus pilosulus (Klug, 1845)
22. Byrsinus pseudosyriacus Linnavuori, 1977
23. Byrsinus rugosus (Jakovlev, 1874)
24. Byrsinus setosus Lis, 2001
25. Byrsinus syriacus (Horváth, 1917)
26. Byrsinus varians (Fabricius, 1803)

== See also ==
- List of heteropteran bugs recorded in Britain
