= Microporus obliquus =

Scientific classification
- Domain: Eukaryota
- Kingdom: Animalia
- Phylum: Arthropoda
- Class: Insecta
- Order: Hemiptera
- Suborder: Heteroptera
- Family: Cydnidae
- Genus: Microporus
- Species: M. obliquus

Binomial name
- Microporus obliquus Uhler, 1872

Species of true bug

Microporus obliquus is a species of burrowing bug in the family Cydnidae. It is found in Central America and North America.
