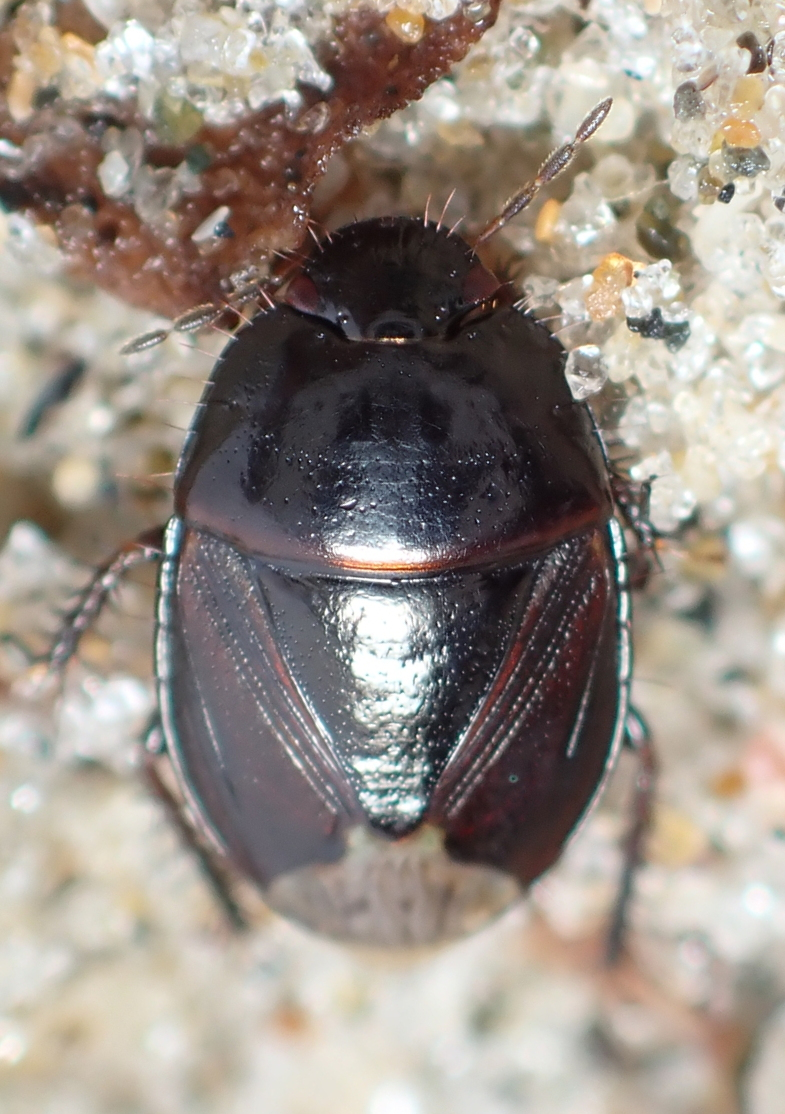

Scientific classification
- Kingdom: Animalia
- Phylum: Arthropoda
- Clade: Pancrustacea
- Class: Insecta
- Order: Hemiptera
- Suborder: Heteroptera
- Family: Cydnidae
- Genus: Macroscytus
- Species: M. australis

Binomial name
- Macroscytus australis (Erichson, 1842)

Synonyms
- List: Cydnus australis Erichson, 1842; Cydnus leptosperm Dallas 1851; Aethus australis (Erichson, 1842); Aethus leptospermi Butler, 1874; Aethus lifuanus Montrouzier, 1861; Geobia australis (Erichson, 1842); Geocnethus australis (Erichson, 1842); Geotomus lansbergi Signoret, 1883; Geotomus leptospermi (Butler, 1874); Hahnia australis (Erichson, 1842); Macroscytus australicus (Erichson, 1842); Macroscytus landsbergi (Signoret, 1883); Philapodemus australis (Erichson, 1842)

= Macroscytus australis =

Species of true bug

Macroscytus australis is a species of burrowing bug native to Australia, Indonesia, New Caledonia and New Zealand. They were first formally described in 1842 by Wilhelm Ferdinand Erichson. Typically, they occur in open sandy areas with varying amounts of vegetation such as the seashore, but can also be found at high altitudes and in floodplains. They are often found hiding under rocks and other debris such as rotting wood. Adults can be found throughout most of the year, except for June and July. Eggs are laid from November to February, with juveniles taking 44–52 days to reach maturity. They are known to feed on grass seeds, including those of Poa annua. As adults, they have a shiny dark brown colouration and the males are 5.75–6.81 mm in length whereas the females are 5.73–6.81 mm.

== Taxonomy ==
M. australis was first described in 1842 as Cydnus australis by Wilhelm Ferdinand Erichson from specimens collected in Tasmania. The species was described again in 1861 as Aethus lifuanus from specimens collected on Lifou Island. Similarly, in 1874 it was described again from New Zealand specimens as Aethus leptospermi, which was based on the work of previous authors that named the species, but did not formally describe it (and thus these authors cannot be considered the describer of the species). In 1883, the species was described again as Geotomus lansbergi from specimens collected in Java. The extra species descriptions were later synonymised and C. australis received several redescriptions and genus transfers before finally being placed in the genus Macroscytus.

== Description ==
The males are 5.75–6.81 mm in length whereas the females are 5.73–6.81 mm. Overall, both sexes are largely identical and shiny dark brown to black colouration. Their bodies have an oval shape and have small punctures spread throughout. The first and second segments of the antennae are yellowish whilst the remaining segments are brownish. There are four to six bristles at the sides of the forward projecting lobe of their heads and two on the tip of the lobe. Similarly, the pronotum (the first segment of the thorax) has ten to twelve long bristles along their margins. Their hemelytra, which are hardened plates that cover the abdomen, have membranes that are well developed and translucent. Overall, their legs are yellowish-brown to blackish, with spines on the underside of the femur (the largest segment of their leg) and throughout their tibia (segment after the femur).

=== Juveniles ===
In the first instar (developmental stages between moults), they are 1.2 mm in length. During this instar most of the body is light brown, with the membrane parts being yellowish. The segments of the thorax are divided down the middle. Segments two to eight of the abdomen have plates, of which segments two to three are divided in the middle. The second instars are about 1.79 mm in length, which resembles the first instar but the brown parts are darker and the membranes are fully yellow. The thorax plates are wider, with only the last set of plates not reaching the margins of the body. In the third instar, they are 2.68 mm in length and have identical colouration to the second instar. The thorax plates all fully extend to the margins of the body whilst the abdominal plates are identical to the second instar. During this stage, the ocelli (simple light sensing organs) develop on the head. The fourth instars are 3.59 mm in length, with the head, thorax and abdominal plates being very dark brown. At this stage, the thorax begins to develop wing buds and the scutellum (a triangular plate at the base of the thorax) whilst the abdominal plates are similar to the previous instar. Finally, the fifth instars are 4.46 mm in length and are coloured similarly to the previous instar. The wing buds and scutellum are more strongly developed and abdominal plates remain largely unchanged.

=== Eggs ===
The eggs have an ovoid shape, being 0.79 mm long and 0.53 mm wide. The chorion (the surface layer of the egg) is colourless, transparent and featureless. At the tip of the egg, there are a series of bumps termed "micropylar processes" in a ring.

== Distribution and habitat ==
M. australis is native to Australia, Indonesia, New Caledonia and New Zealand. In Australia, they are recorded from Tasmania, Western Australia, Queensland and New South Wales. Within New Zealand, they are found throughout the North Island and in the South Island south to the Central Otago region. They also occur on New Zealand's Three Kings Islands. In New Caledonia, they are known to occur on both the mainland and on Lifou Island.

They typically live in open sandy areas that has varying amount of vegetation such as along the seashore, but may also be found in sand spits, forest clearings, empty lots and even inland floodplains such as those in the South Island. They have a broad altitude range, being found from coastal areas to as high as subalpine zones. Frequently they are found hiding under rocks, stones and other debris, but may also be found living under Muelhenbeckia bushes. Occasionally, they are found living in rotting vegetation. When they are living at higher altitudes, they may also hide at the bases of plants on screes.

== Life history ==
Eggs are laid from November to February, corresponding to late spring and summer in the southern hemisphere. In laboratory conditions, the eggs would be deposited on soil and grass seeds. When laid in soil, particles stuck to the eggs, covering them. The eggs incubate for 10 to 16 days before finally hatching. After hatching, the juveniles must go through five instars before maturing into an adult. The first instar takes 6–13 days, the second 5–9 days, the third 3–8 days, the fourth 6–11 days and finally the fifth 15–17 days, with it taking the freshly emerged juveniles 44–52 days in total to reach maturity. As adults, they have fully developed wings and may be capable of flight. Mating has been reported occurring in October, November and January, being apparently univoltine (producing a single generation a year) throughout most of its range. It has been suggested that they may be bivoltine (producing two generations per year) in northern areas.

Adults occur throughout the year, except for June and July (winter months). They appear to overwinter as adults. It has been proposed that fifth instar juveniles may also overwinter in warmer parts of their distribution. They are more commonly seen from October to February, but may also be abundant from November to April in cooler and higher altitude areas. They are recorded feeding on grass seeds such as those from Poa annua.
