= Pangaeus congruus =

Scientific classification
- Domain: Eukaryota
- Kingdom: Animalia
- Phylum: Arthropoda
- Class: Insecta
- Order: Hemiptera
- Suborder: Heteroptera
- Family: Cydnidae
- Genus: Pangaeus
- Species: P. congruus

Binomial name
- Pangaeus congruus (Uhler, 1877)

Species of true bug

Pangaeus congruus is a species of burrowing bug in the family Cydnidae. It is found in Central America and North America.
