= Amnestus pallidus =

Scientific classification
- Domain: Eukaryota
- Kingdom: Animalia
- Phylum: Arthropoda
- Class: Insecta
- Order: Hemiptera
- Suborder: Heteroptera
- Family: Cydnidae
- Genus: Amnestus
- Species: A. pallidus

Binomial name
- Amnestus pallidus Zimmer, 1910

Species of true bug

Amnestus pallidus is a species of burrowing bug in the family Cydnidae. It is found in Central America and North America.
