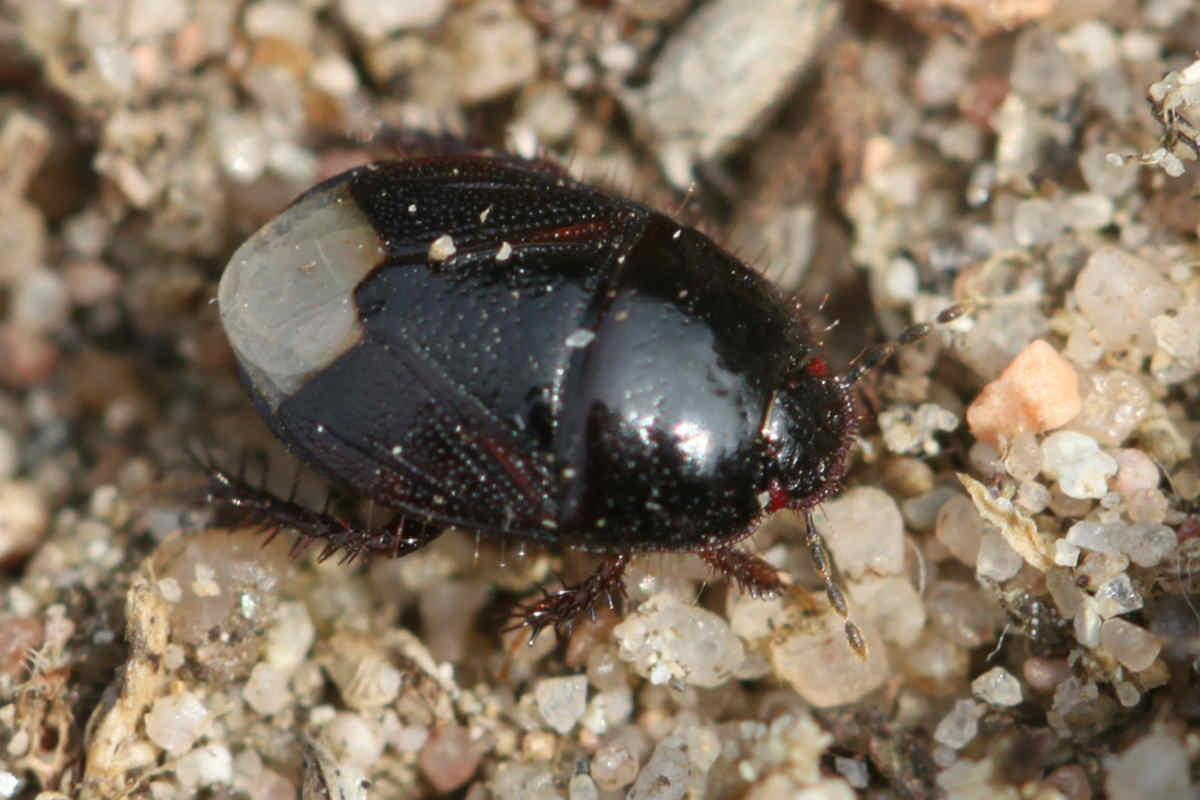
- Microporus nigrita

Scientific classification
- Domain: Eukaryota
- Kingdom: Animalia
- Phylum: Arthropoda
- Class: Insecta
- Order: Hemiptera
- Suborder: Heteroptera
- Family: Cydnidae
- Subfamily: Cydninae
- Genus: Microporus; Uhler, 1872

= Microporus (bug) =

Genus of true bugs

Microporus is a genus of burrowing bugs in the family Cydnidae. There are at least four described species in Microporus.

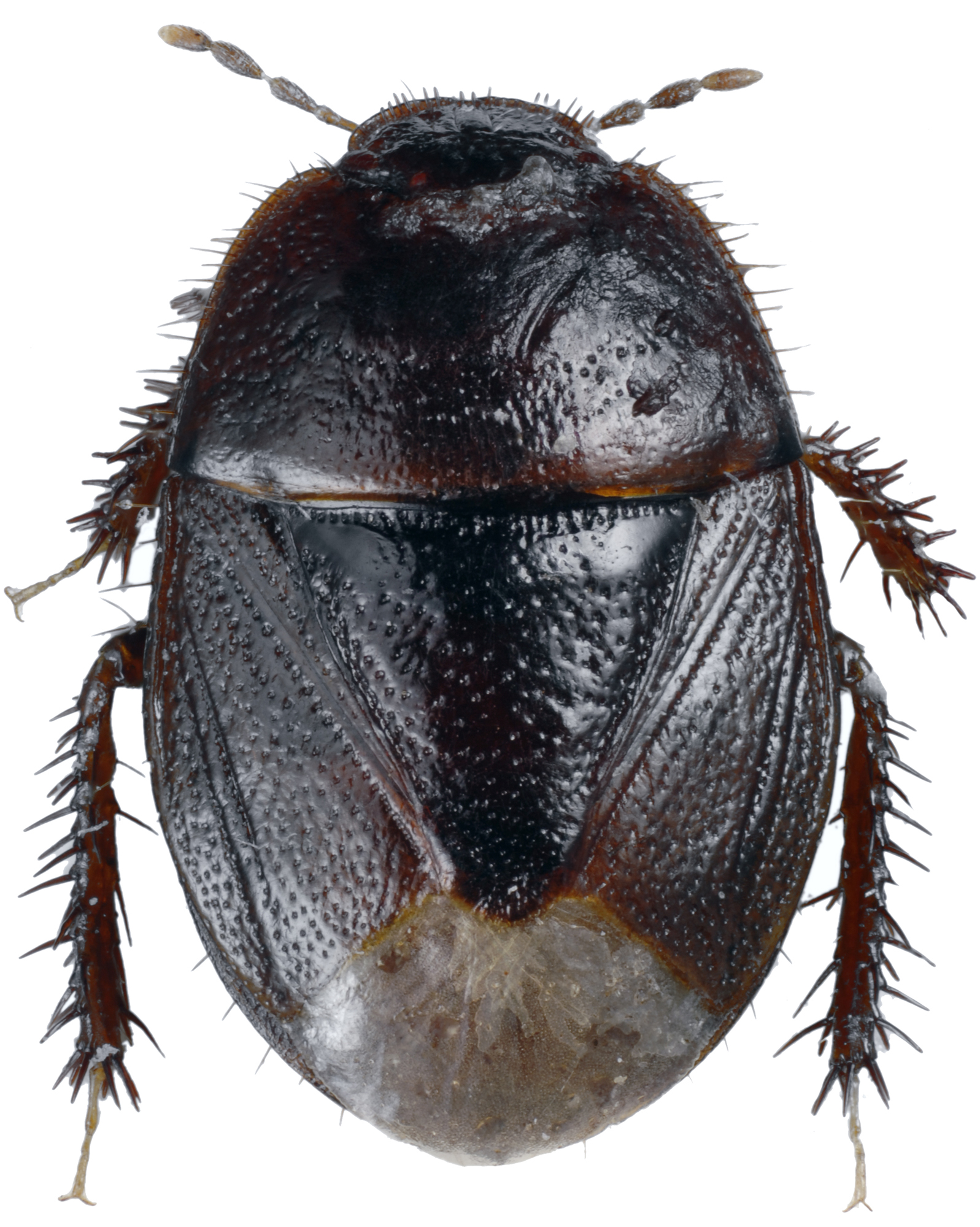
Microporus nigrita

== Species ==
These four species belong to the genus Microporus:

- Microporus nigrita (Fabricius, 1794) (black ground bug)
- Microporus obliquus Uhler, 1872
- Microporus shiromai Froeschner, 1977
- Microporus testudinatus Uhler, 1876
