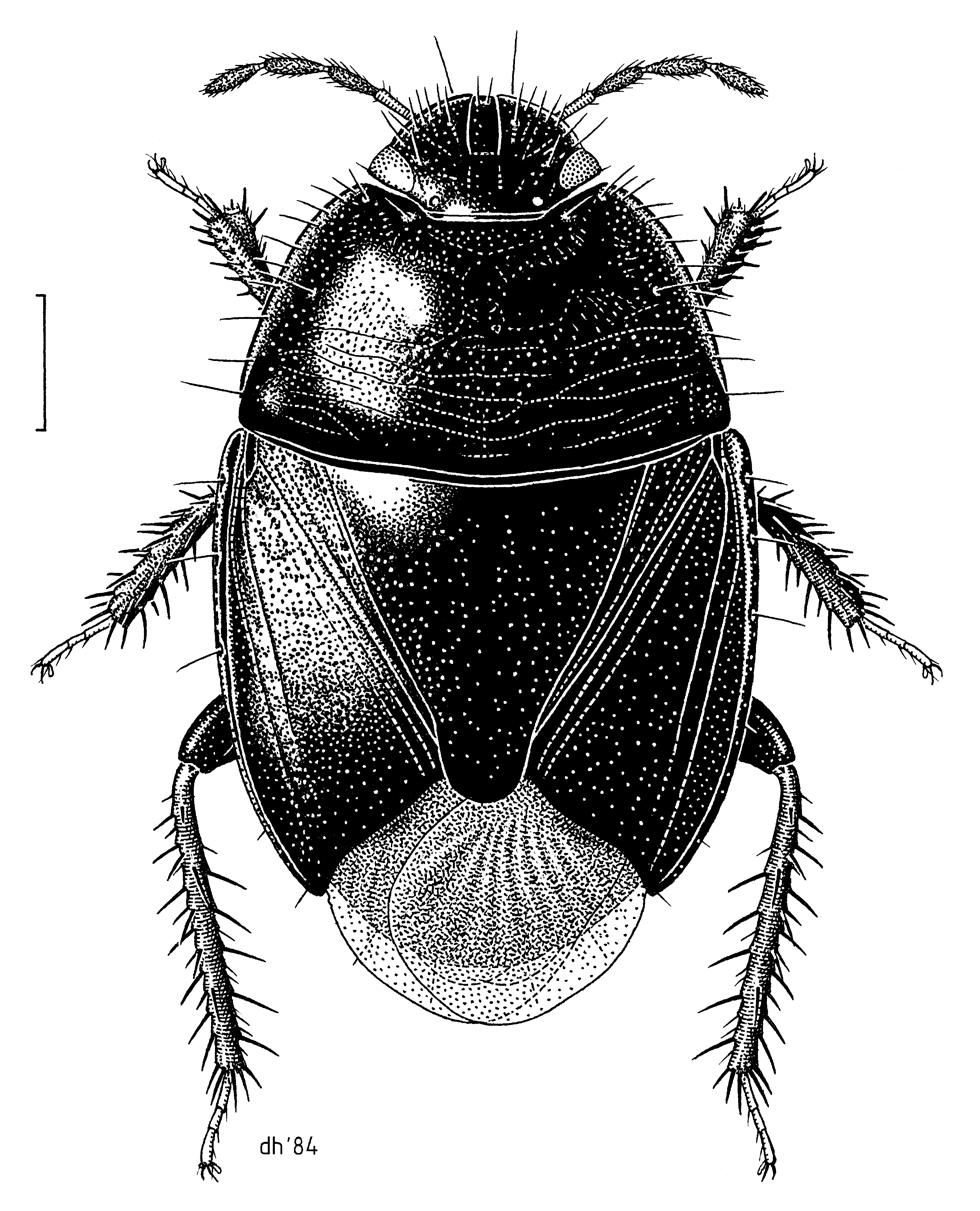
- Macroscytus australis illustration

Scientific classification
- Kingdom: Animalia
- Phylum: Arthropoda
- Class: Insecta
- Order: Hemiptera
- Suborder: Heteroptera
- Family: Cydnidae
- Tribe: Geotomini
- Genus: Macroscytus; Fieber, 1860

Species
- 14, see text

= Macroscytus =

Genus of true bugs

Macroscytus is a genus of Cydnidae. There are 14 described species as of January 2026.

== Species ==
- Macroscytus aequalis
- Macroscytus annulipoides
- Macroscytus arnhemicus
- Macroscytus australis
- Macroscytus bisetosus
- Macroscytus brunneus
- Macroscytus fraterculus
- Macroscytus glaberrimus
- Macroscytus japonensis
- Macroscytus matilei
- Macroscytus minimus
- Macroscytus piceus
- Macroscytus reflexus
- Macroscytus subaeneus
