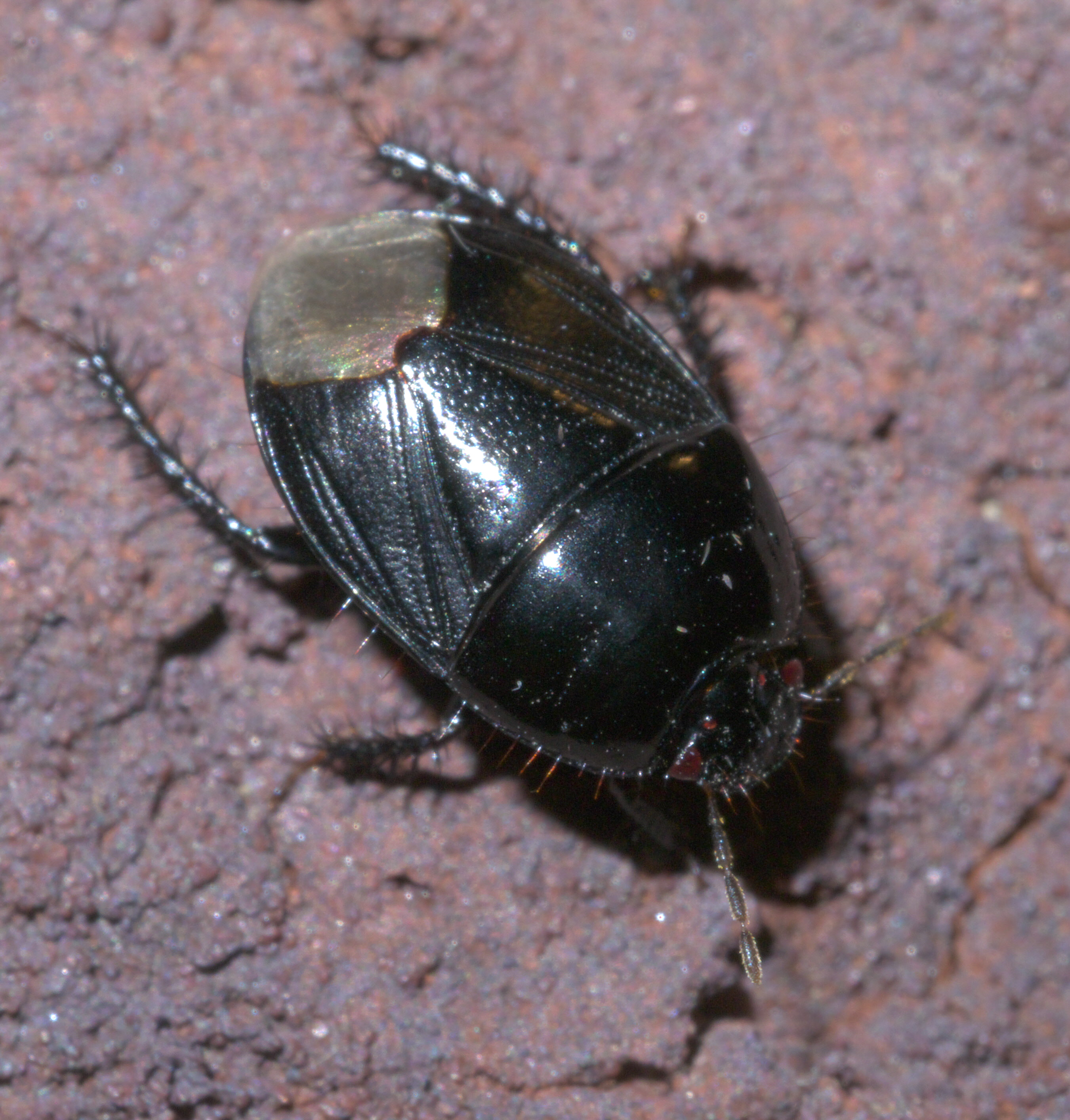
- Pangaeus bilineatus

Scientific classification
- Kingdom: Animalia
- Phylum: Arthropoda
- Clade: Pancrustacea
- Class: Insecta
- Order: Hemiptera
- Suborder: Heteroptera
- Family: Cydnidae
- Subfamily: Cydninae
- Genus: Pangaeus; Stål, 1862

= Pangaeus (bug) =

Genus of true bugs

Pangaeus is a genus of burrowing bugs in the family Cydnidae. There are about 14 described species in Pangaeus.

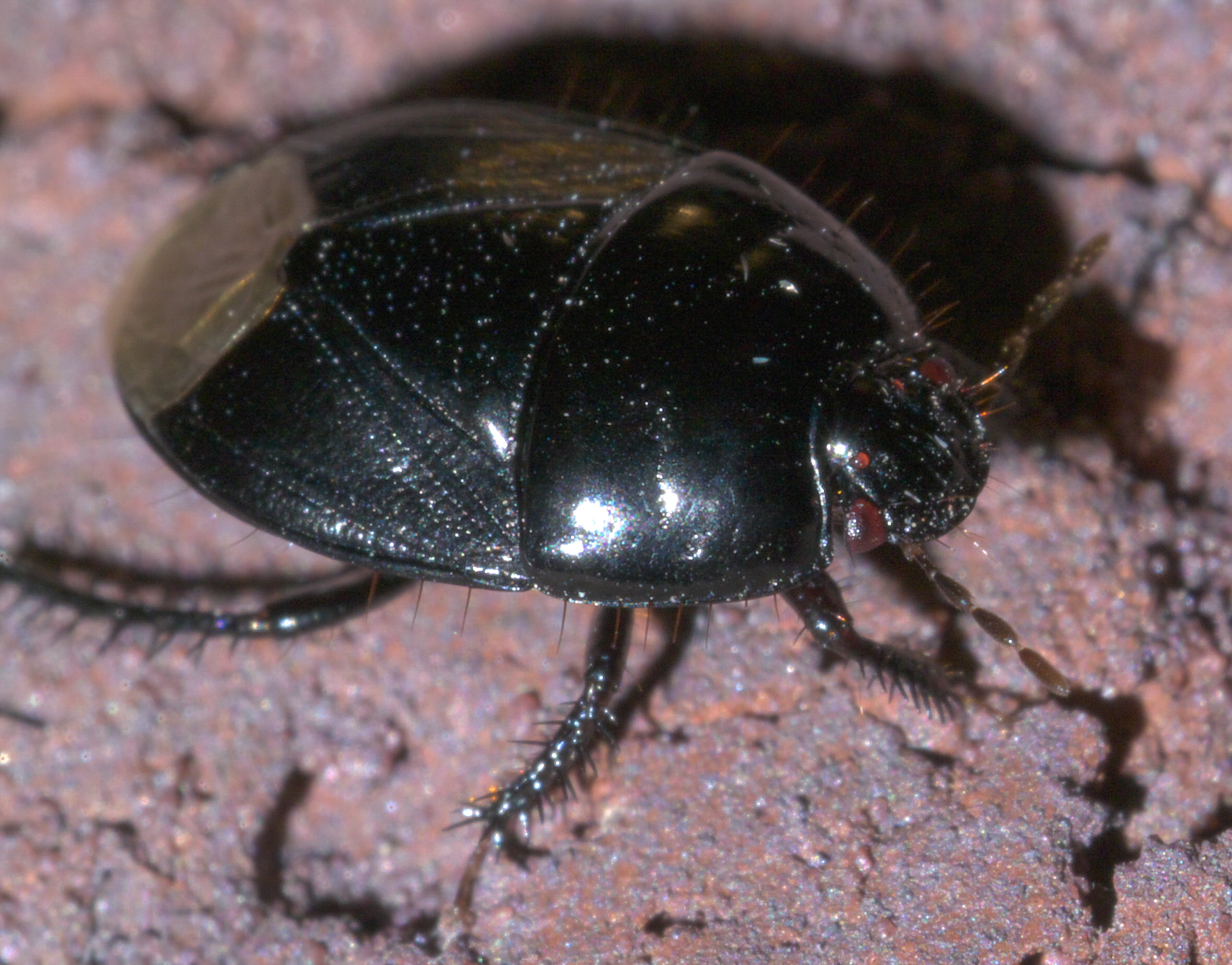
Pangaeus bilineatus

== Species ==
These 14 species belong to the genus Pangaeus:

- Pangaeus aethiops (Fabricius, 1787)^{i c g}
- Pangaeus bilineatus (Say, 1825)^{i c g b} (peanut burrower bug)
- Pangaeus congruus (Uhler, 1877)^{i c g b}
- Pangaeus docilis (Walker, 1867)^{g}
- Pangaeus laevigatus^{g}
- Pangaeus moestus Stal^{g}
- Pangaeus piceatus Stål, 1862^{g}
- Pangaeus punctilineus Froeschner, 1960^{i c g}
- Pangaeus rubrifemur^{g}
- Pangaeus rugiceps Horvath^{g}
- Pangaeus serripes^{g}
- Pangaeus setosus Froeschner, 1960^{i c g}
- Pangaeus tuberculipes Froeschner, 1960^{i c g}
- Pangaeus xanthopus^{g}

Data sources: i = ITIS, c = Catalogue of Life, g = GBIF, b = Bugguide.net
