= Tominotus =

Scientific classification
- Domain: Eukaryota
- Kingdom: Animalia
- Phylum: Arthropoda
- Class: Insecta
- Order: Hemiptera
- Suborder: Heteroptera
- Family: Cydnidae
- Subfamily: Cydninae
- Tribe: Geotomini
- Genus: Tominotus; Mulsant & Rey, 1866

Synonyms
- Psectrocephalus Van Duzee, 1922; Trichocoris Uhler, 1876

Genus of true bugs

Tominotus is a genus of burrowing bugs in the family Cydnidae. There are about 11 described species in Tominotus.

== Species ==
These 11 species belong to the genus Tominotus:

- Tominotus brevirostris Froeschner
- Tominotus brevis (Signoret, 1881)
- Tominotus caecus (Van Duzee, 1922)
- Tominotus communis (Uhler, 1877)
- Tominotus conformis (Uhler, 1876)
- Tominotus hogenhoferi Signoret
- Tominotus inconspicuus
- Tominotus laeviculus
- Tominotus ondulatus Schwertner, 2017
- Tominotus signoreti (Mulsant & Rey, 1866)
- Tominotus unisetosus Froeschner, 1960
