= Scaptocoris castaneus =

Scientific classification
- Domain: Eukaryota
- Kingdom: Animalia
- Phylum: Arthropoda
- Class: Insecta
- Order: Hemiptera
- Suborder: Heteroptera
- Family: Cydnidae
- Genus: Scaptocoris
- Species: S. castaneus

Binomial name
- Scaptocoris castaneus Perty, 1833

Synonyms
- Scaptocoris castanea Perty, 1833

Species of true bug

Scaptocoris castaneus is a species of burrowing bug in the family Cydnidae. It is found in North America and South America.
