= Amnestus spinifrons =

Scientific classification
- Domain: Eukaryota
- Kingdom: Animalia
- Phylum: Arthropoda
- Class: Insecta
- Order: Hemiptera
- Suborder: Heteroptera
- Family: Cydnidae
- Genus: Amnestus
- Species: A. spinifrons

Binomial name
- Amnestus spinifrons (Say, 1825)

Synonyms
- Cydnus spinifrons Say, 1825

Species of true bug

Amnestus spinifrons is a species of burrowing bug in the family Cydnidae. It is found in North America.
