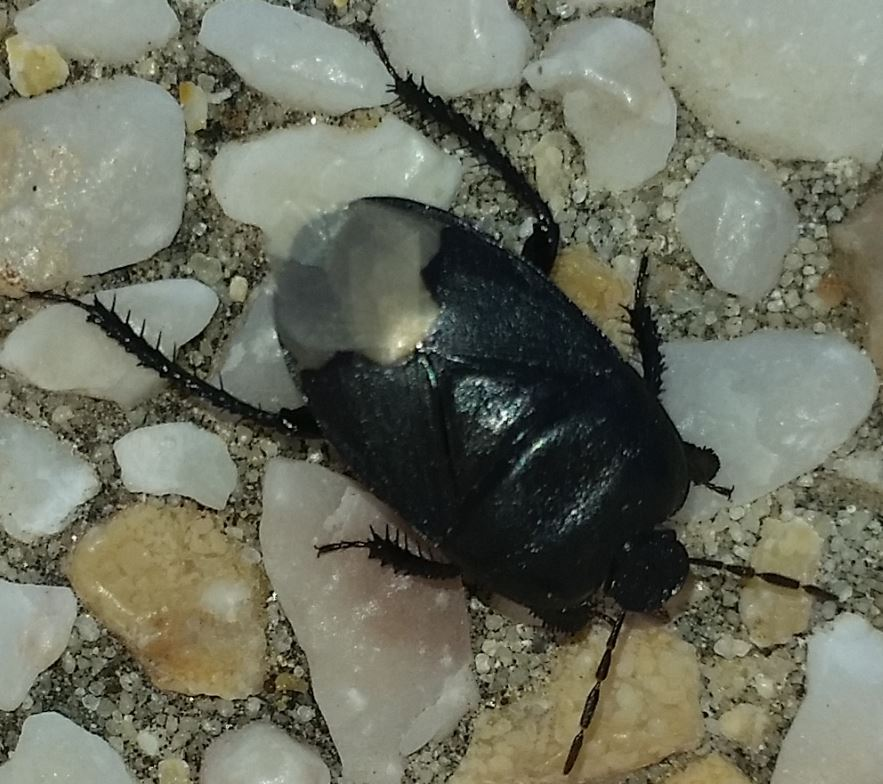
- Cydnus aterrimus

Scientific classification
- Domain: Eukaryota
- Kingdom: Animalia
- Phylum: Arthropoda
- Class: Insecta
- Order: Hemiptera
- Suborder: Heteroptera
- Family: Cydnidae
- Tribe: Cydnini
- Genus: Cydnus; Fabricius, 1803

= Cydnus (bug) =

Genus of true bugs

Cydnus is a genus of burrowing bugs in the tribe Cydnini. There are at least three described species in Cydnus.

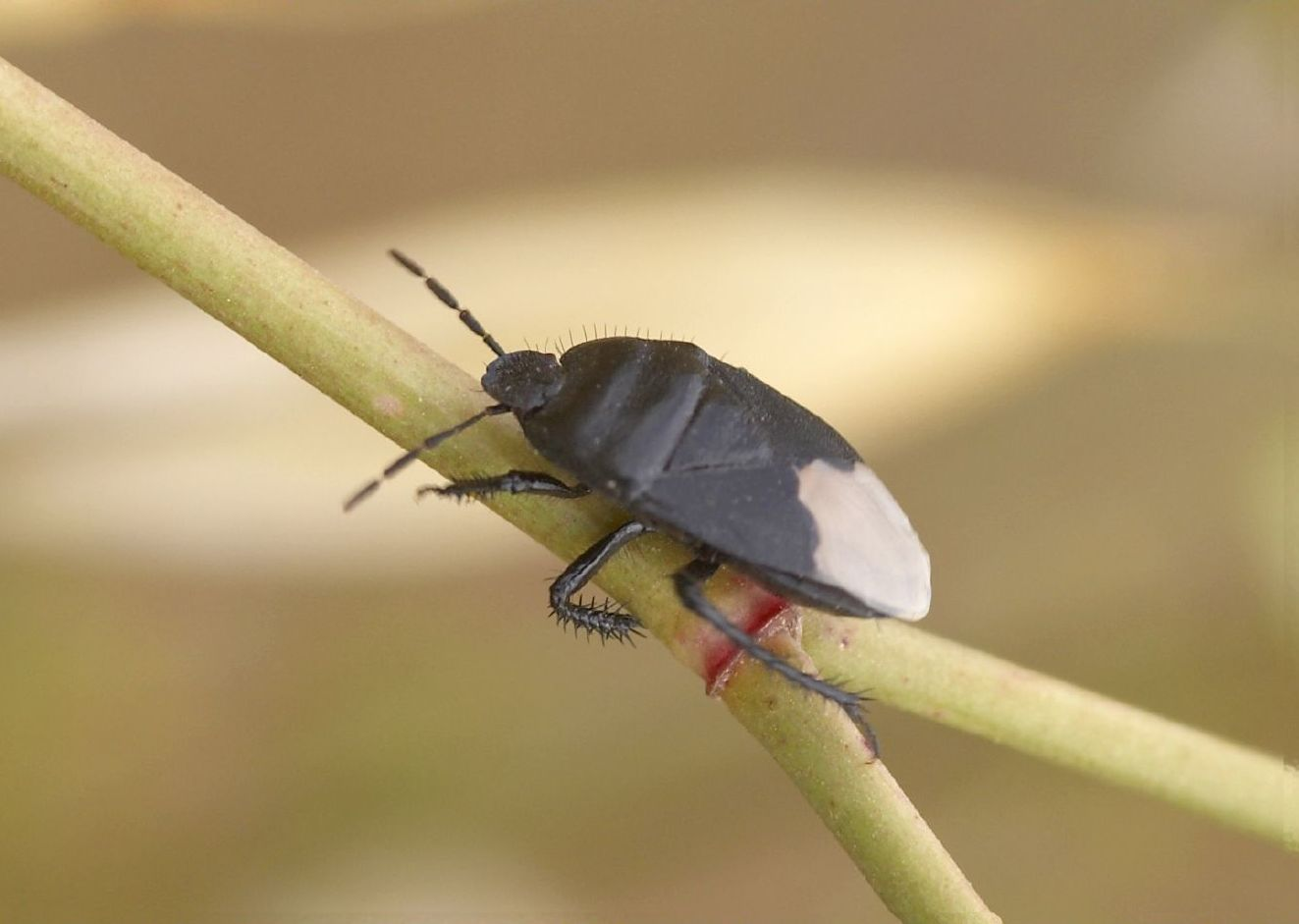
Cydnus aterrimus

== Species ==
These three species belong to the genus Cydnus:

- Cydnus aterrimus (Forster, 1771)^{i c g b}
- Cydnus insularis Westwood, 1837^{g}
- Cydnus latipes Westwood, 1837^{g}

Data sources: i = ITIS, c = Catalogue of Life, g = GBIF, b = Bugguide.net
