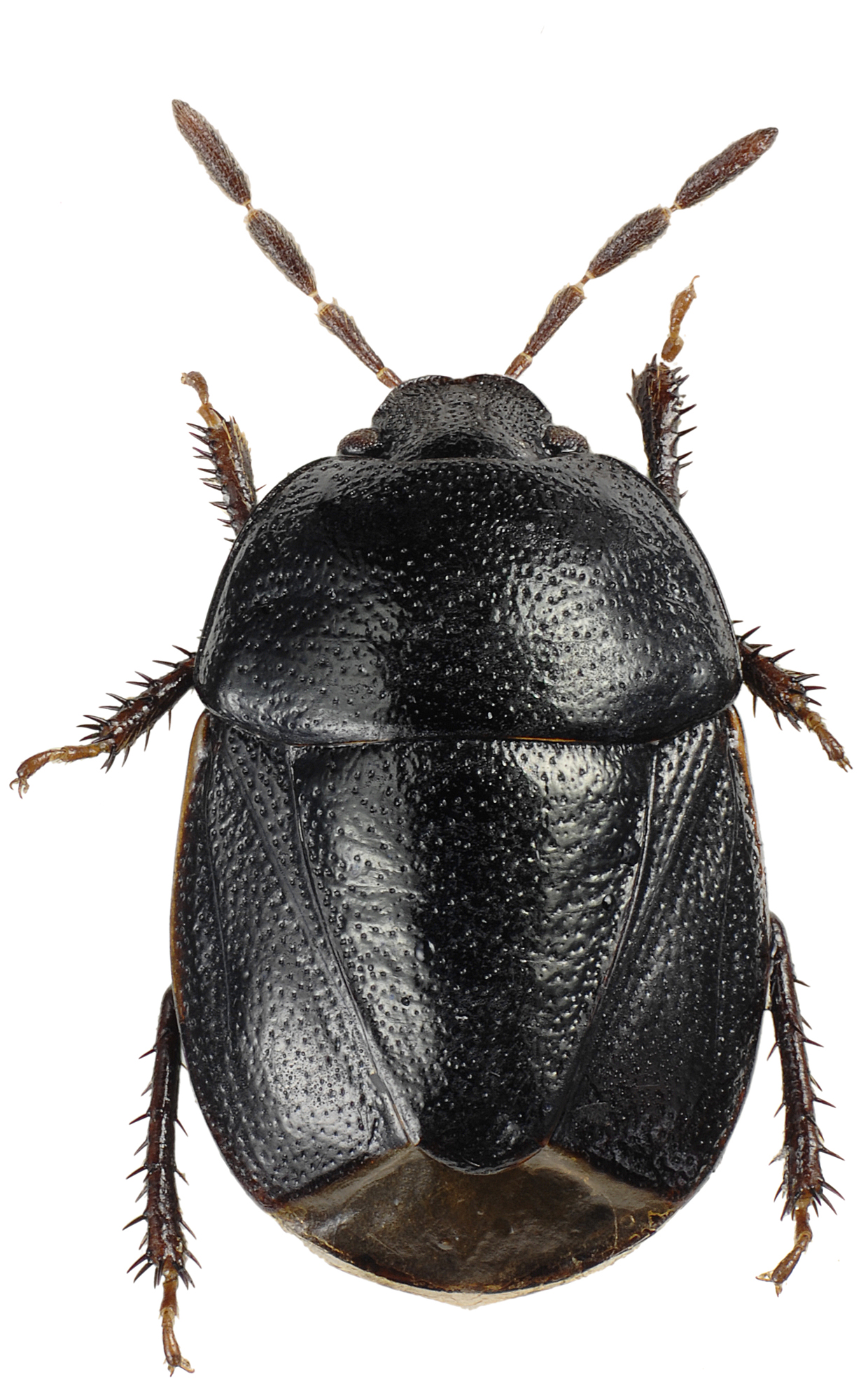

Scientific classification
- Domain: Eukaryota
- Kingdom: Animalia
- Phylum: Arthropoda
- Class: Insecta
- Order: Hemiptera
- Suborder: Heteroptera
- Family: Cydnidae
- Genus: Legnotus
- Species: L. picipes

Binomial name
- Legnotus picipes (Fallén, 1807)

= Legnotus picipes =

Species of true bug

Legnotus picipes is a species of true bug belonging to the family Cydnidae.

It is native to Europe.
