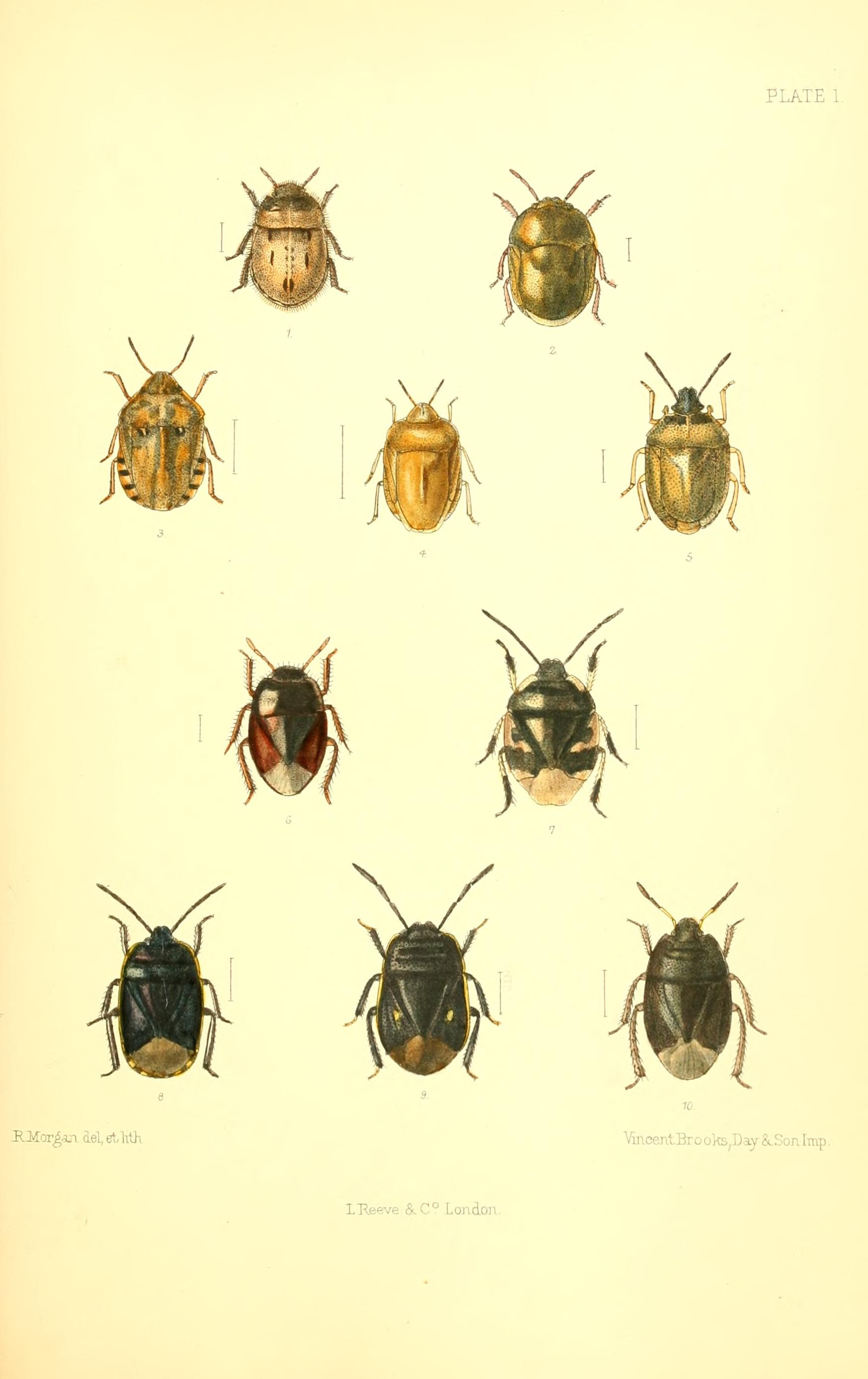
- Image number 6 - Geotomus punctulatus

Scientific classification
- Domain: Eukaryota
- Kingdom: Animalia
- Phylum: Arthropoda
- Class: Insecta
- Order: Hemiptera
- Suborder: Heteroptera
- Family: Cydnidae
- Genus: Geotomus
- Species: G. punctulatus

Binomial name
- Geotomus punctulatus (A. Costa, 1847)

Synonyms
- Cydnus punctulatus A. Costa, 1847

= Geotomus punctulatus =

Species of true bug

Geotomus punctulatus, also known as the Cornish shieldbug, is a species of burrowing bug in the family Cydnidae, found in Asia and Europe.

== Description ==
A small black shieldbug, 3.5 mm to 4.5 mm in length, with sparse, long hairs around the head, forewings and pronotum. The corium and rear margin of the pronotum often has reddish markings. It feeds on lady's bedstraw (Galium verum) in sparsely vegetated areas of loose sand in sand dunes.

== Distribution and status ==
The species is widely distributed in the southern Palaearctic from Great Britain to Japan. In Great Britain it has been found near Sennen Cove, on the towans at Whitesand Bay, Cornwall for over one hundred years and two specimens were taken from Cowbridge, Vale of Glamorgan in the 19th century. The Cornish population is not known but probably numbers in the hundreds rather than thousands. In 1962 it was present ″in considerable numbers″ and on 31 May 1982 it was numerous. This location is above a popular beach so is under threat from excessive public pressure.
