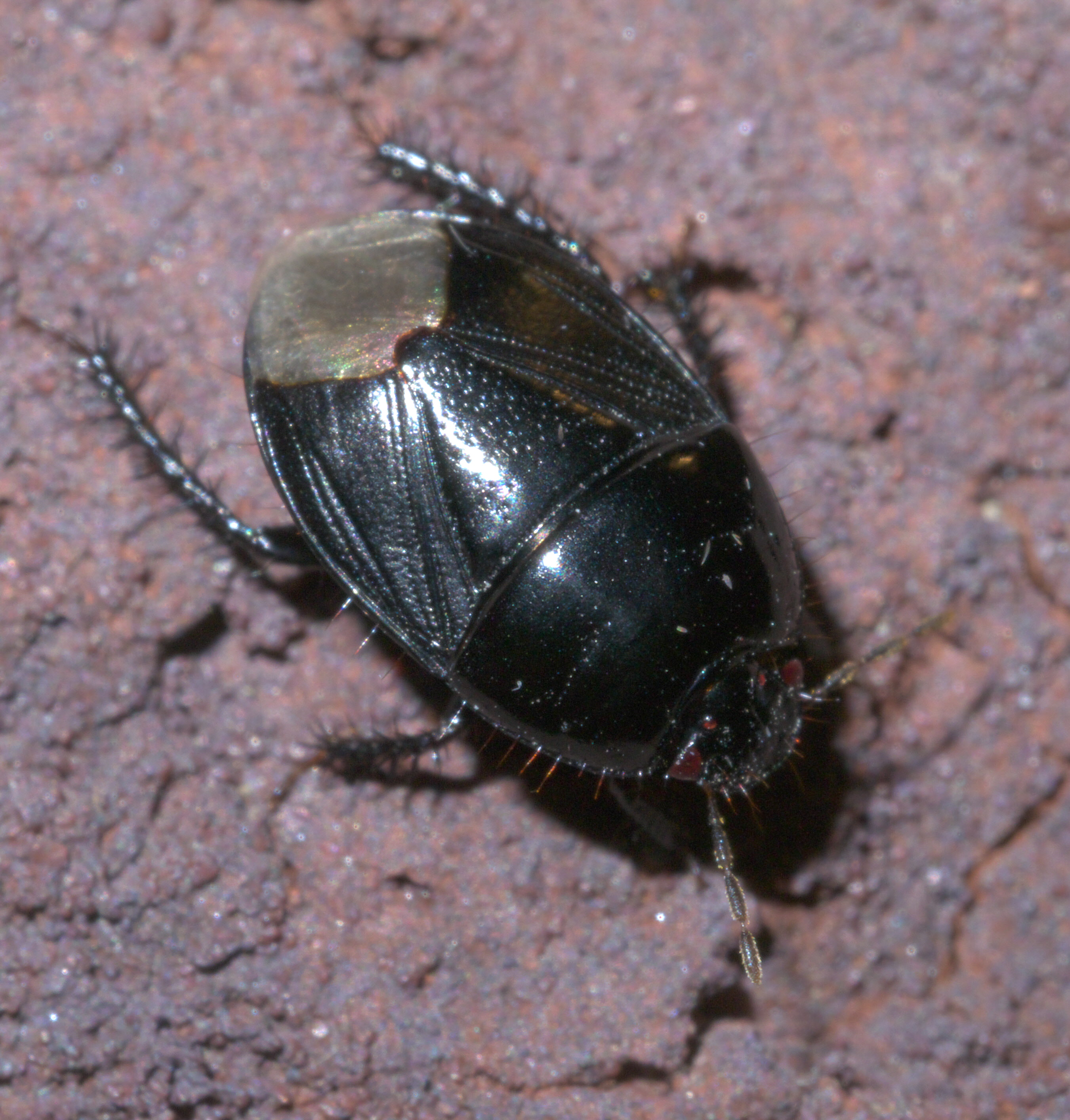

Scientific classification
- Kingdom: Animalia
- Phylum: Arthropoda
- Clade: Pancrustacea
- Class: Insecta
- Order: Hemiptera
- Suborder: Heteroptera
- Family: Cydnidae
- Genus: Pangaeus
- Species: P. bilineatus

Binomial name
- Pangaeus bilineatus (Say, 1825)

= Pangaeus bilineatus =

Species of true bug

Pangaeus bilineatus, the peanut burrower bug, is a species of burrowing bug in the family Cydnidae. It can be found in North and Central America as far south as Guatemala, and islands in the Caribbean Sea.

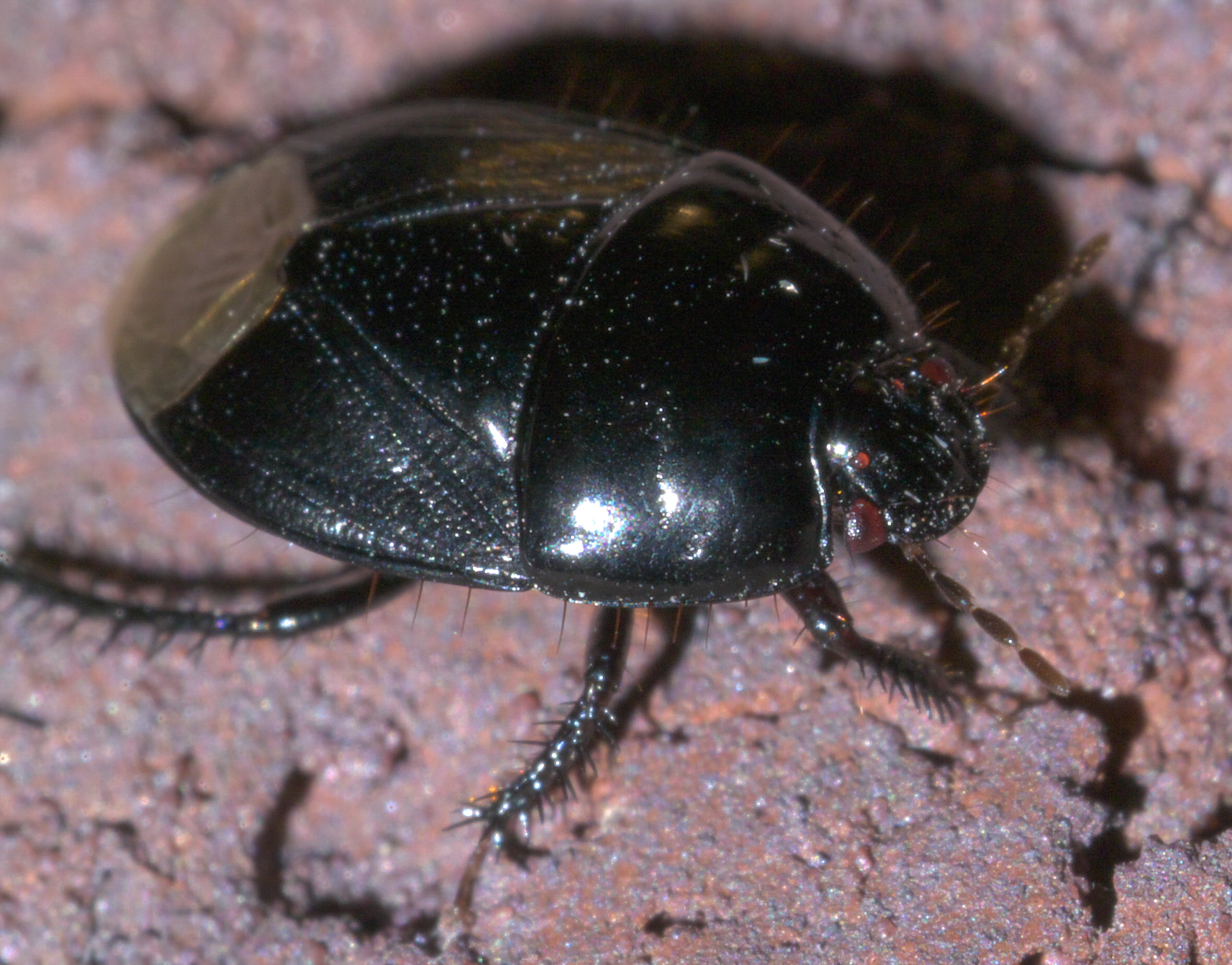
Peanut burrower bug, Pangaeus bilineatus
