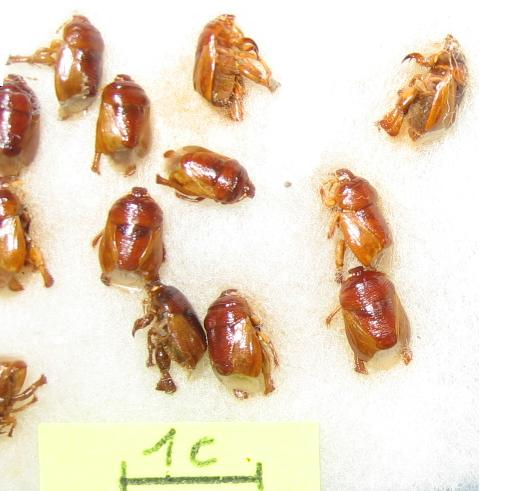
- Scaptocoris minor

Scientific classification
- Domain: Eukaryota
- Kingdom: Animalia
- Phylum: Arthropoda
- Class: Insecta
- Order: Hemiptera
- Suborder: Heteroptera
- Family: Cydnidae
- Genus: Scaptocoris; Perty, 1830

= Scaptocoris =

Genus of true bugs

Scaptocoris is a genus of burrowing bugs in the family Cydnidae. There are at least four described species in Scaptocoris.

== Species ==
These four species belong to the genus Scaptocoris:

- Scaptocoris buckupi Becker^{g}
- Scaptocoris carvalhoi Becker^{g}
- Scaptocoris castaneus Perty, 1833^{i c g b}
- Scaptocoris talpa Champion^{g}

Data sources: i = ITIS, c = Catalogue of Life, g = GBIF, b = Bugguide.net
