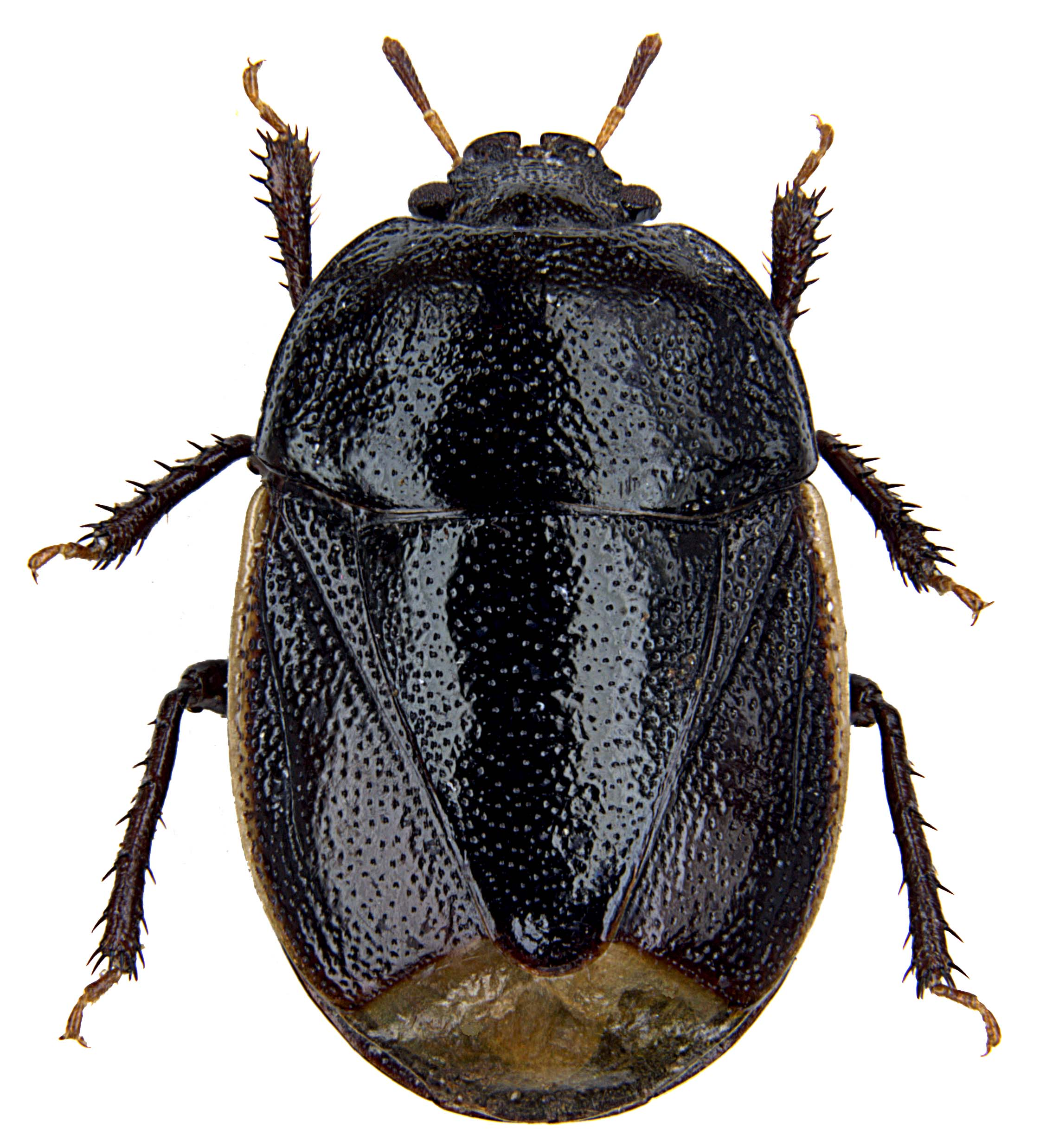
- Legnotus limbosus

Scientific classification
- Kingdom: Animalia
- Phylum: Arthropoda
- Clade: Pancrustacea
- Class: Insecta
- Order: Hemiptera
- Suborder: Heteroptera
- Family: Cydnidae
- Genus: Legnotus; Schiødte, 1848

= Legnotus =

Genus of true bugs

Legnotus is a genus of true bugs belonging to the family Cydnidae.

European species include:

- Legnotus fumigatus (A. Costa, 1853)
- Legnotus limbosus (Geoffroy, 1785)
- Legnotus picipes (Fallen, 1807)
