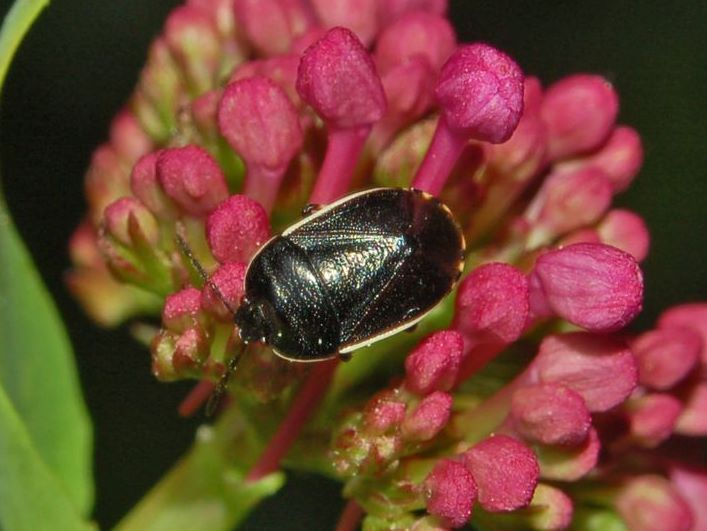
- Canthophorus dubius

Scientific classification
- Domain: Eukaryota
- Kingdom: Animalia
- Phylum: Arthropoda
- Class: Insecta
- Order: Hemiptera
- Suborder: Heteroptera
- Family: Cydnidae
- Subfamily: Sehirinae
- Genus: Sehirus; Amyot and Serville, 1843

Synonyms
- Canthophorus (Mulsant and Rey)

= Sehirus =

Genus of true bugs

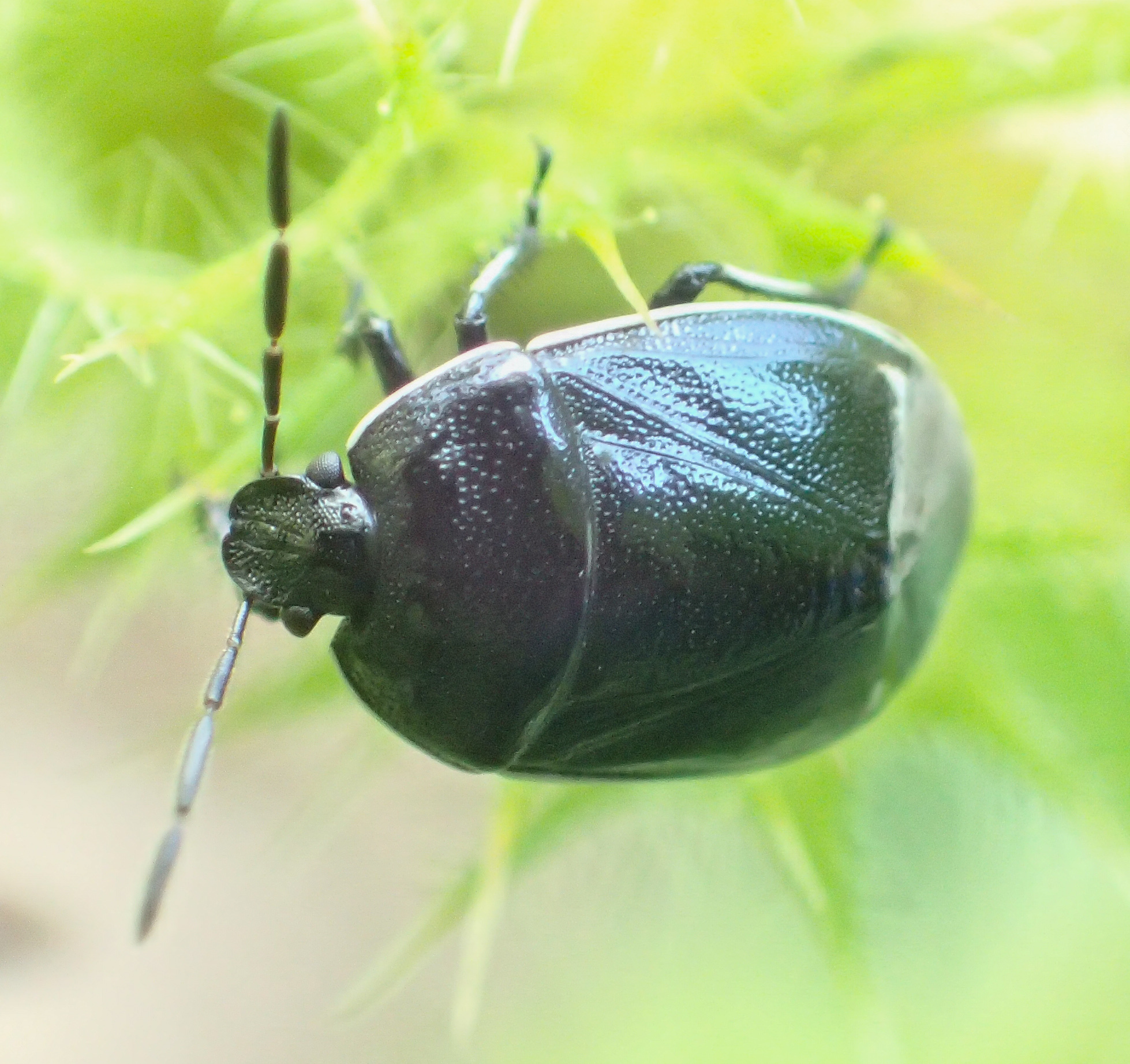
Sehirus cinctus, New York

Sehirus is a genus of burrowing bugs belonging to the family Cydnidae, subfamily Sehirinae.

== Species ==
These 15 species belong to the genus Sehirus:

- Sehirus aeneus Walker, 1867
- Sehirus carpathiensis Lis et al., 2015
- Sehirus cinctus (Palisot, 1811)
- Sehirus cypriacus Dohrn, 1860
- Sehirus dissimilis Horvath, 1919
- Sehirus luctuosus Mulsant & Rey, 1866
- Sehirus lygaeus Statz & Wagner, 1950
- Sehirus morio (Linnaeus, 1761)
- Sehirus ovatus (Herrich-Schaeffer, 1840)
- Sehirus paludosus Statz & Wagner, 1950
- Sehirus parens Mulsant & Rey, 1866
- Sehirus planiceps Horvath, 1895
- Sehirus robustus Horvath, 1895
- Sehirus spinitibialis Statz & Wagner, 1950
- Sehirus tibialis (Stål) Stal
