= Amnestus =

Scientific classification
- Domain: Eukaryota
- Kingdom: Animalia
- Phylum: Arthropoda
- Class: Insecta
- Order: Hemiptera
- Suborder: Heteroptera
- Family: Cydnidae
- Genus: Amnestus; Dallas, 1851

Genus of true bugs

Amnestus is a genus of burrowing bugs in the family Cydnidae. There are more than 40 described species in Amnestus.

== Species ==
These 48 species belong to the genus Amnestus:

- Amnestus andersoni Mayorga & Mayorga, 2017
- Amnestus basidentatus Froeschner, 1960
- Amnestus bergrothi Distant
- Amnestus brailovskyanus Mayorga & Mayorga, 2017
- Amnestus brailovskyi Mayorga & Cervantes
- Amnestus brunneus Signoret
- Amnestus calakmulensis Mayorga & Cervantes
- Amnestus carinatus Mayorga & Cervantes
- Amnestus carinopilosus Mayorga & Cervantes
- Amnestus championi Distant
- Amnestus chiapensis Mayorga & Cervantes
- Amnestus cristobalensis Mayorga & Cervantes
- Amnestus dallasi Distant
- Amnestus denticulatus Mayorga & Cervantes
- Amnestus diminuatus Barber
- Amnestus ficus Mayorga & Cervantes
- Amnestus forreri Distant
- Amnestus foveatus Froeschner
- Amnestus henryi Mayorga & Cervantes
- Amnestus laevifemoralis Mayorga & Cervantes
- Amnestus lateralis Signoret, 1883
- Amnestus longinoi Mayorga & Cervantes
- Amnestus lorenae Mayorga & Cervantes
- Amnestus marcelae Mayorga & Cervantes
- Amnestus mendeli
- Amnestus oaxacensis Mayorga & Mayorga, 2017
- Amnestus obscurus Mayorga & Cervantes
- Amnestus ortegae Mayorga & Mayorga, 2017
- Amnestus pallidus Zimmer, 1910
- Amnestus puncticarinatus Mayorga & Cervantes
- Amnestus pusillus Uhler, 1876
- Amnestus pusio (Stål, 1860)
- Amnestus radialis Froeschner
- Amnestus rugosus Mayorga & Cervantes
- Amnestus santiagensis Mayorga & Cervantes
- Amnestus septemclavatus Mayorga & Cervantes
- Amnestus sexdentatus Froeschner
- Amnestus signoreti Distant
- Amnestus sinuosus Mayorga & Cervantes
- Amnestus spinifrons (Say, 1825)
- Amnestus stali Distant
- Amnestus subferrugineus Westwood
- Amnestus trimaculatus Froeschner, 1960
- Amnestus uhleri Distant
- Amnestus zacki
- † Amnestus electricus Thomas, 1994
- † Amnestus guapinolinus Thomas, 1988
- † Amnestus priscus Thomas, 1994
