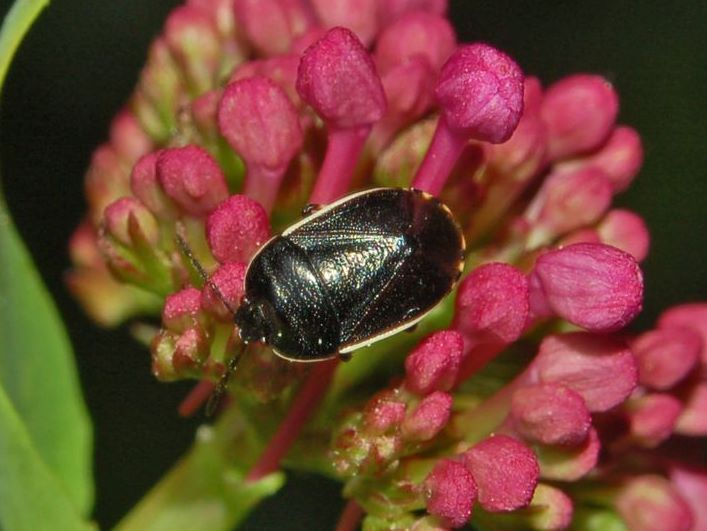
- Canthophorus dubius

Scientific classification
- Domain: Eukaryota
- Kingdom: Animalia
- Phylum: Arthropoda
- Class: Insecta
- Order: Hemiptera
- Suborder: Heteroptera
- Family: Cydnidae
- Subfamily: Sehirinae; Amyot and Serville, 1843

= Sehirinae =

Subfamily of true bugs

Sehirinae is a subfamily of burrowing bugs belonging to the family Cydnidae.

== Genera ==
Tribe Amaurocorini Wagner, 1963

- Amaurocoris Stål, 1865
- Angra Schumacher, 1913
- Linospa Signoret, 1881

Tribe Sehirini Amyot & Serville, 1843

- Adomerus Mulsant & Rey, 1866
- Canthophorus Mulsant & Rey, 1866
- Crocistethus Fieber, 1860
- Exosehirus Wagner, 1963
- Lalervis Signoret, 1881
- Legnotus Schiødte, 1848
- Ochetostethomorpha Schumacher, 1913
- Ochetostethus Fieber, 1860
- Sehirus Amyot & Serville, 1843
- Singeria Wagner, 1955
- Tacolus Schouteden, 1910
- Tritomegas Amyot & Serville, 1843
