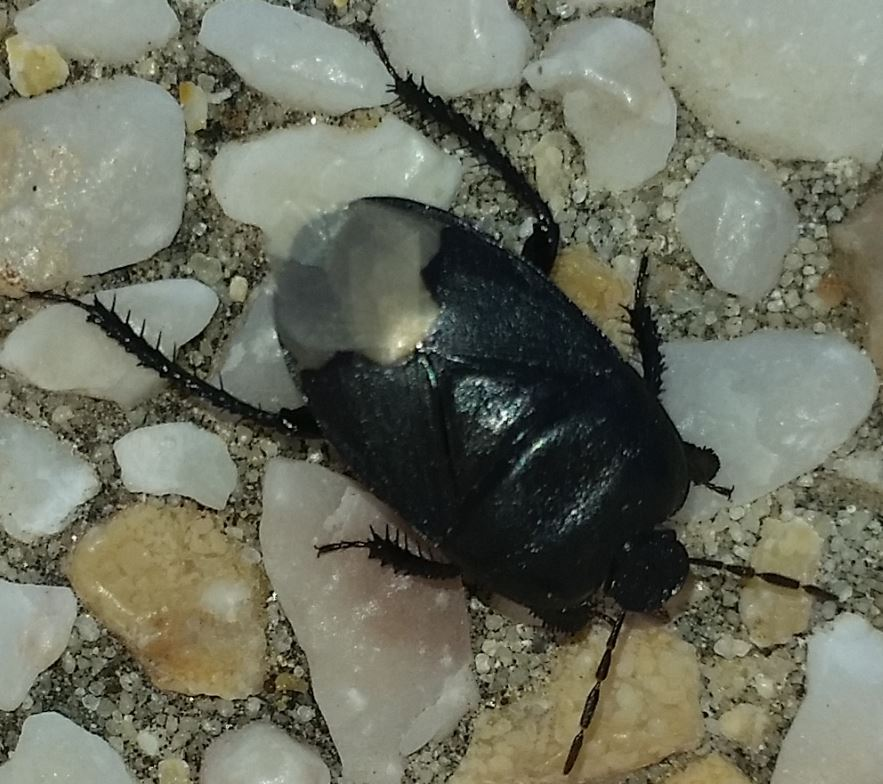
- Cydnus aterrimus

Scientific classification
- Domain: Eukaryota
- Kingdom: Animalia
- Phylum: Arthropoda
- Class: Insecta
- Order: Hemiptera
- Suborder: Heteroptera
- Family: Cydnidae
- Subfamily: Cydninae; Billberg, 1820

= Cydninae =

Subfamily of true bugs

Cydninae is a subfamily of burrowing bugs in the family Cydnidae. There are about 11 genera and at least 40 described species in Cydninae.

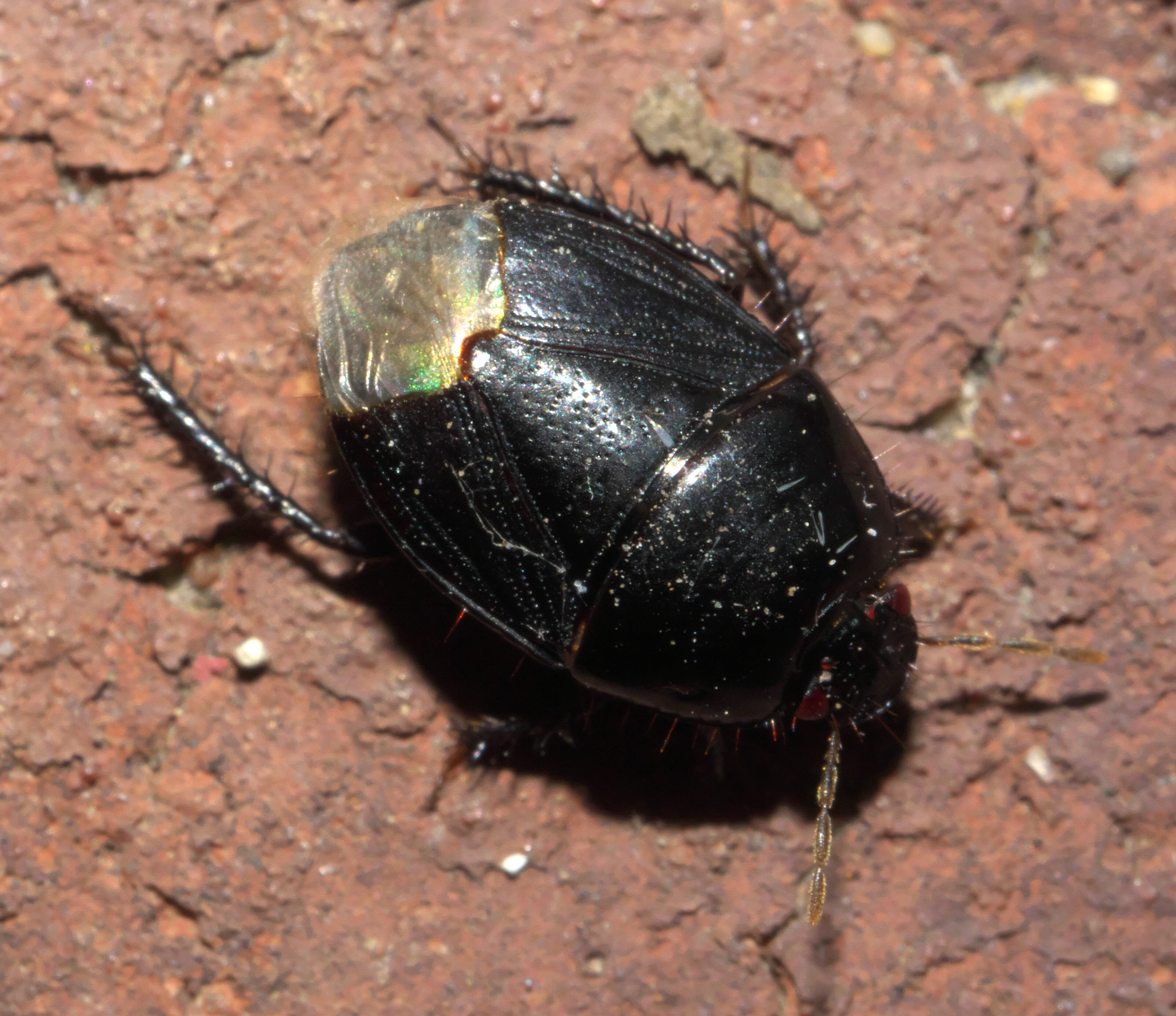
Pangaeus bilineatus

== Tribes and Genera ==
BioLib includes 2 tribes in the subfamily Cydninae:

=== Cydnini ===
Auth. Billberg, 1820

1. Blaena Walker, 1868
2. Blaenocoris J.A. Lis, 1997
3. Centrostephus Horváth, 1919
4. Chilocoris Mayr, 1865^{i c g b}
5. Cydnotomus Lis, 2000
6. Cydnus Fabricius, 1803^{i c g b}
- More genera ...

Data sources: i = ITIS, c = Catalogue of Life, g = GBIF, b = Bugguide.net

=== Geotomini ===
Auth. Wagner, 1963

1. Adrisa Amyot & Audinet-Serville, 1843
2. Aethoscytus Lis, 1994
3. Aethus Dallas, 1851
4. Afraethus Linnavuori, 1977
5. Afroscytus Lis, 1997
6. Alonipes Signoret, 1881
7. Byrsinocoris Montandon, 1900
8. Byrsinus Fieber, 1860
9. Choerocydnus White, 1841
10. Coleocydnus Lis, 1994
11. Cydnochoerus Lis, 1996
12. Cyrtomenus Amyot & Audinet-Serville, 1843
13. Dallasiellus Berg, 1901
14. Dearcla Signoret, 1883
15. Ectinopus Dallas, 1851
16. Endotylus Horváth, 1919
17. Eulonips Lis, 1996
18. Fromundiellus Lis, 1994
19. Fromundus Distant, 1901
20. Gampsotes Signoret, 1881
21. Geocnethus Horváth, 1919
22. Geopeltus Lis, 1990
23. Geotomus Mulsant & Rey, 1866
24. Hemixesta Bergroth, 1911
25. Hiverus Amyot & Serville, 1843
26. Katakadia Distant, 1899
27. Lactistes Schiödte, 1848
28. Macroscytus Fieber, 1860
29. Megacydnus Linnavuori, 1993
30. Melanaethus Uhler, 1876
31. Mesocricus Horváth, 1884
32. Microporus Uhler, 1872^{i g b}
33. Microscytus Lis, 1993
34. Onalips Signoret, 1881
35. Pangaeus Stål, 1862^{i c g b}
36. Paraethus Lis, 1994
37. Peltoscytus Lis, 1993
38. Peribyssus Puton, 1888
39. Plonisa Signoret, 1881
40. Prokne Linnavuori, 1993
41. Prolactistes Lis, 2001
42. Prolobodes Amyot & Serville, 1843
43. Pseudonalips Froeschner, 1960
44. Pseudoscoparipes Lis, 1990
45. Raunoloma Lis, 1999
46. Rhytidoporus Uhler, 1877
47. Scoparipes Signoret, 1879
48. Scoparipoides Lis, 1990
49. Shansia Esaki & Ishihara, 1951
50. Shillukia Linnavuori, 1977
51. Teabooma Distant, 1914
52. Tominotus Mulsant & Rey, 1866
