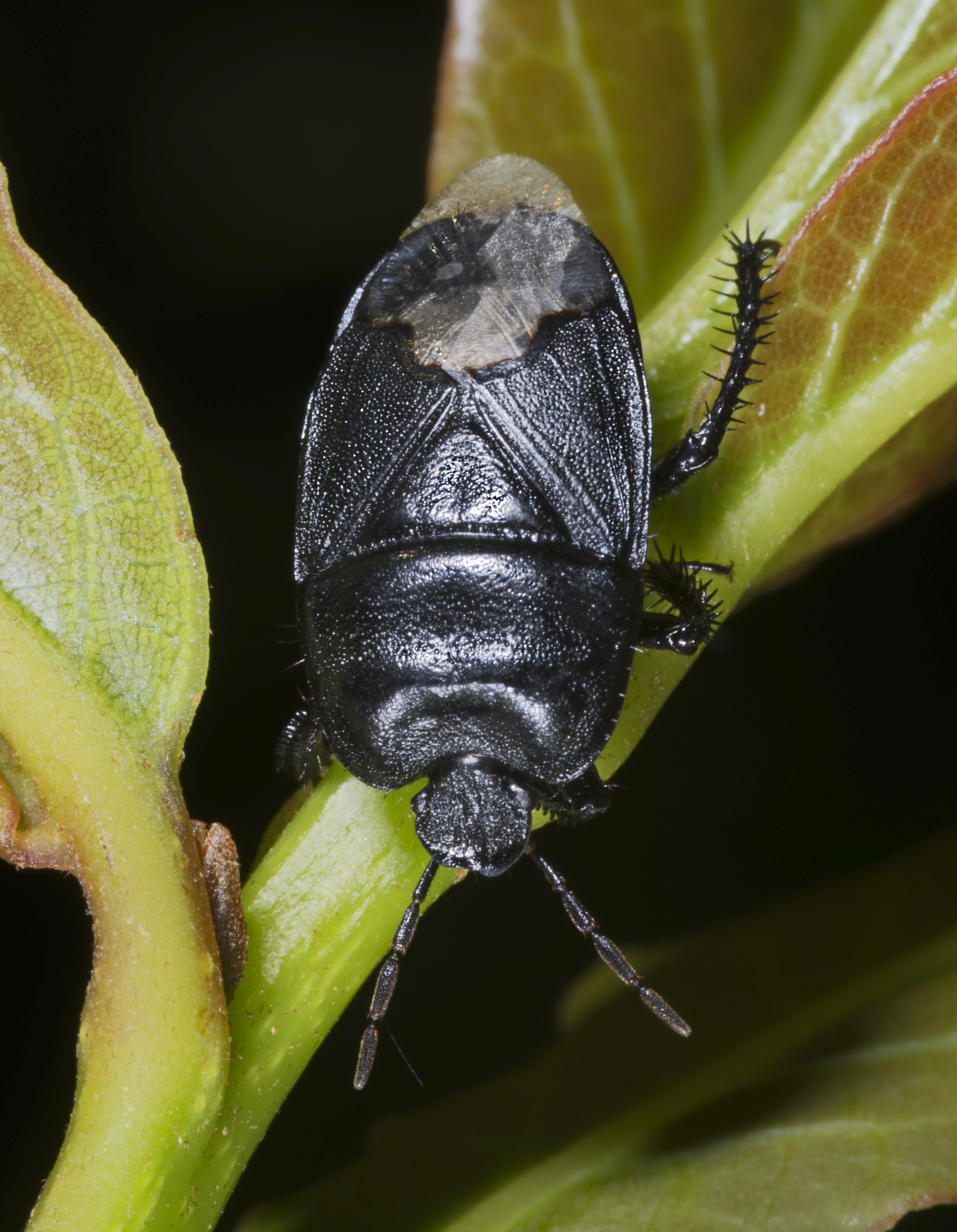
- Cydnus aterrimus Type genus for the family

Scientific classification
- Kingdom: Animalia
- Phylum: Arthropoda
- Class: Insecta
- Order: Hemiptera
- Suborder: Heteroptera
- Superfamily: Pentatomoidea
- Family: Cydnidae; Billberg, 1820

= Cydnidae =

Cydnidae Temporal range: Aptian–Present

Family of true bug

Cydnidae are a family of pentatomoid bugs, known by common names including burrowing bugs or burrower bugs. As the common name would suggest, many members of the group live a subterranean lifestyle, burrowing into soil using their head and forelegs, only emerging to mate and then laying their eggs in soil. Other members of the group are not burrowers, and live above the soil layer, often in close association with plants. Several species are known as agricultural pests.

== Description ==
Burrowing bugs range from 2 to 20 mm in length. They are dark, ovoid in shape and highly sclerotised. The head is generally subquadrate to semicircular in shape, and has a pair of 5-segmented antennae. The coxae of the legs have setal combs, while the apices of the mid and hind coxae are fringed with rigid setae. The tibiae of the legs (also often the head and pronotum) have spines. The tarsi of the legs are 3-segmented and often reduced.

Similar to other pentatomoids, Cydnidae have glands in the thorax (adults) or the lateral part of the abdomen (nymphs) that secrete a foul-smelling mix of chemicals for defense against predators.

== Ecology ==
Cydnidae in subfamilies Cydninae and Cephalocteinae live mostly in soil and feed on roots of plants. Those in subfamilies Parastrachinae, Sehirinae and Thyreocorinae instead live on aboveground parts of plants. Adults are attracted to light and sometimes in large numbers.

Cydnidae feed on sap from phloem, unlike other heteropterans.

== Importance ==
As of 2003, there were 27 cydnid species reported as crop pests and six that feed on peanut. Of the peanut-feeding species, Pangaeus bilineatus is the most abundant and the only one associated with feeding injury to peanut kernels.

Another pest is Fromundus pygmaeus, which attacks rice seedlings, sugarcane, fallen seeds of grasses and roots of soybean and clover.

Some cydnids are medically important. The aforementioned F. pygmaeus facultatively sucks blood from humans, while Chilocoris assmuthi can cause brown lesions on skin (usually on the feet) with its defensive secretions.

== Subfamilies and taxonomy ==
BioLib includes the following subfamilies:

- Amnestinae Hart, 1919
  - †Acanthamnestus Du, Yao & Engel, 2022 Burmese Amber, Myanmar, mid Cretaceous (latest Albian-earliest Cenomanian)
  - Amnestus Dallas, 1851
  - †Chilamnestocoris Lis et al., 2018 Burmese Amber, Myanmar
  - †Cilicydnus Yao et al., 2007 Yixian Formation, China, Early Cretaceous (Aptian)
  - Lattinestus Eger, 2008
  - †Latiscutella Pinto & de Ornellas, 1974 Crato Formation, Codo Formation, Brazil, Aptian
  - †Orienicydnus Yao et al., 2007 Yixian Formation, China
  - †Pricecoris Pinto & de Ornellas, 1974 Codo Formation, Brazil
  - †Punctacorona Wang et al., 2019 Burmese Amber, Myanmar
- Cephalocteninae Mulsant & Rey, 1866
  - Cephaloctenini Mulsant & Rey, 1866
    - Cephalocteus Dufour, 1834
    - Heissocteus Lis, 2006
  - Scaptocorini Froeschner, 1960
    - Afroropus Lis, 1999
    - Atarsocoris Becker, 1967
    - Pseudostibaropus Lis, 1991
    - Scaptocoris Perty, 1833
    - Schiodtella Signoret, 1882
    - Stibaropus Dallas, 1851
- †Clavicorinae Popov, 1986
  - †Clavicoris Popov, 1986 Gurvan-Eren Formation, Mongolia, Aptian
  - †Cretacoris Popov, 1986 Daya Formation, Russia, Early Cretaceous, Gurvan-Eren Formation, Mongolia
- Cydninae Billberg, 1820
- Garsauriinae Froeschner, 1960
  - Garsauria Walker, 1868
  - Garsauriella Linnavuori, 1993
- Sehirinae Amyot & Audinet-Serville, 1843
  - †Eocenocydnus Popov, 2019 Bembridge Marls, United Kingdom, Eocene (Priabonian)

In some older classifications, Cydnidae sensu lato includes the subfamily Thyreocorinae (now a separate family, Thyreocoridae), which are known commonly as "negro bugs" or "ebony bugs", and/or the families Thaumastellidae and Parastrachiidae.
