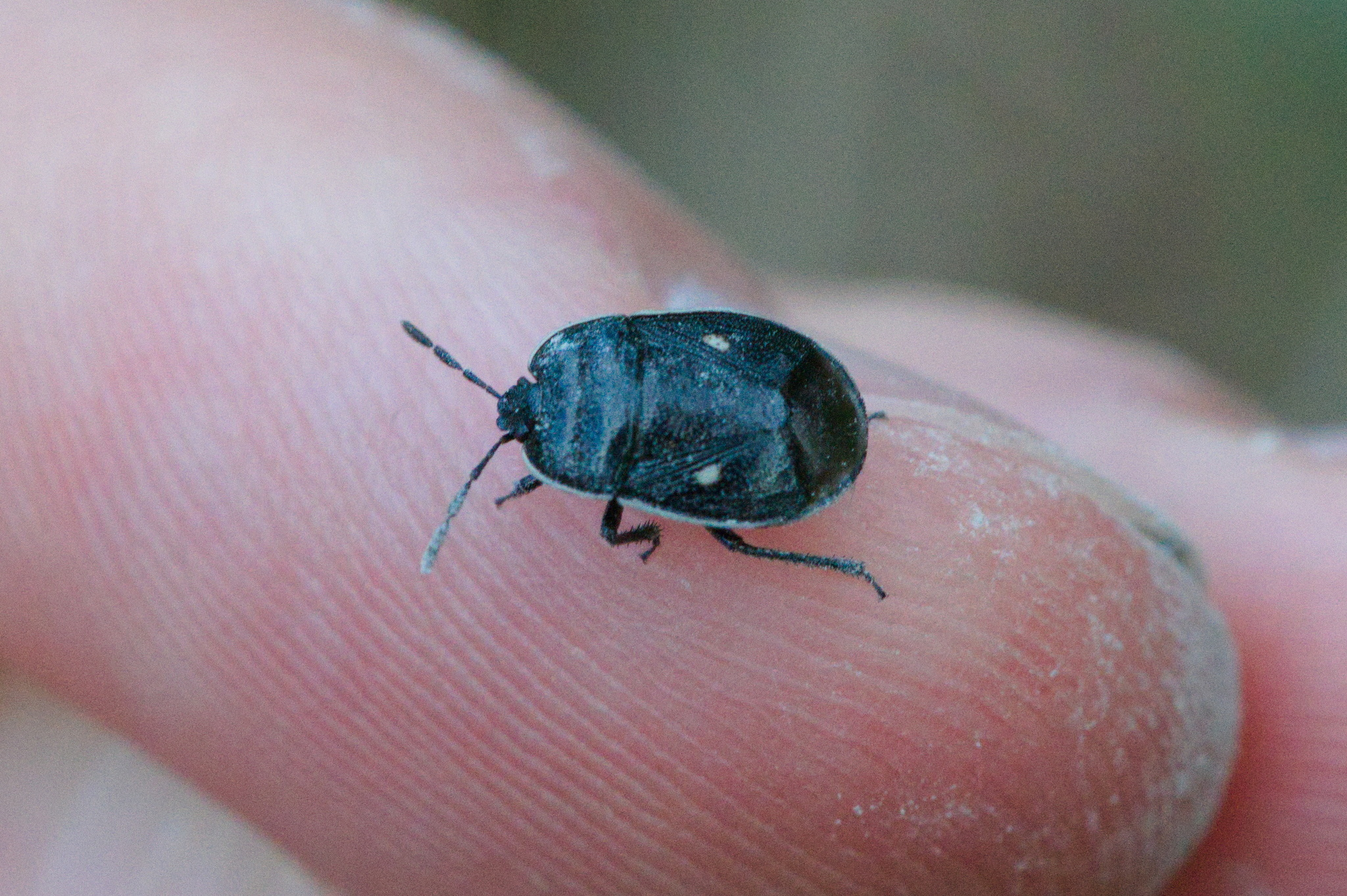
- Adomerus biguttatus

Scientific classification
- Domain: Eukaryota
- Kingdom: Animalia
- Phylum: Arthropoda
- Class: Insecta
- Order: Hemiptera
- Suborder: Heteroptera
- Family: Cydnidae
- Genus: Adomerus (Linnaeus, 1758)

= Adomerus =

Genus of true bug

Adomerus is a genus of true bugs belonging to the family Cydnidae.

== Taxonomy ==
Adomerus has the following species:

- Adomerus biguttatus
- Adomerus fuscipennis
- Adomerus maculipes
- Adomerus rotundus
- Adomerus triguttulus
- Adomerus variegatus
