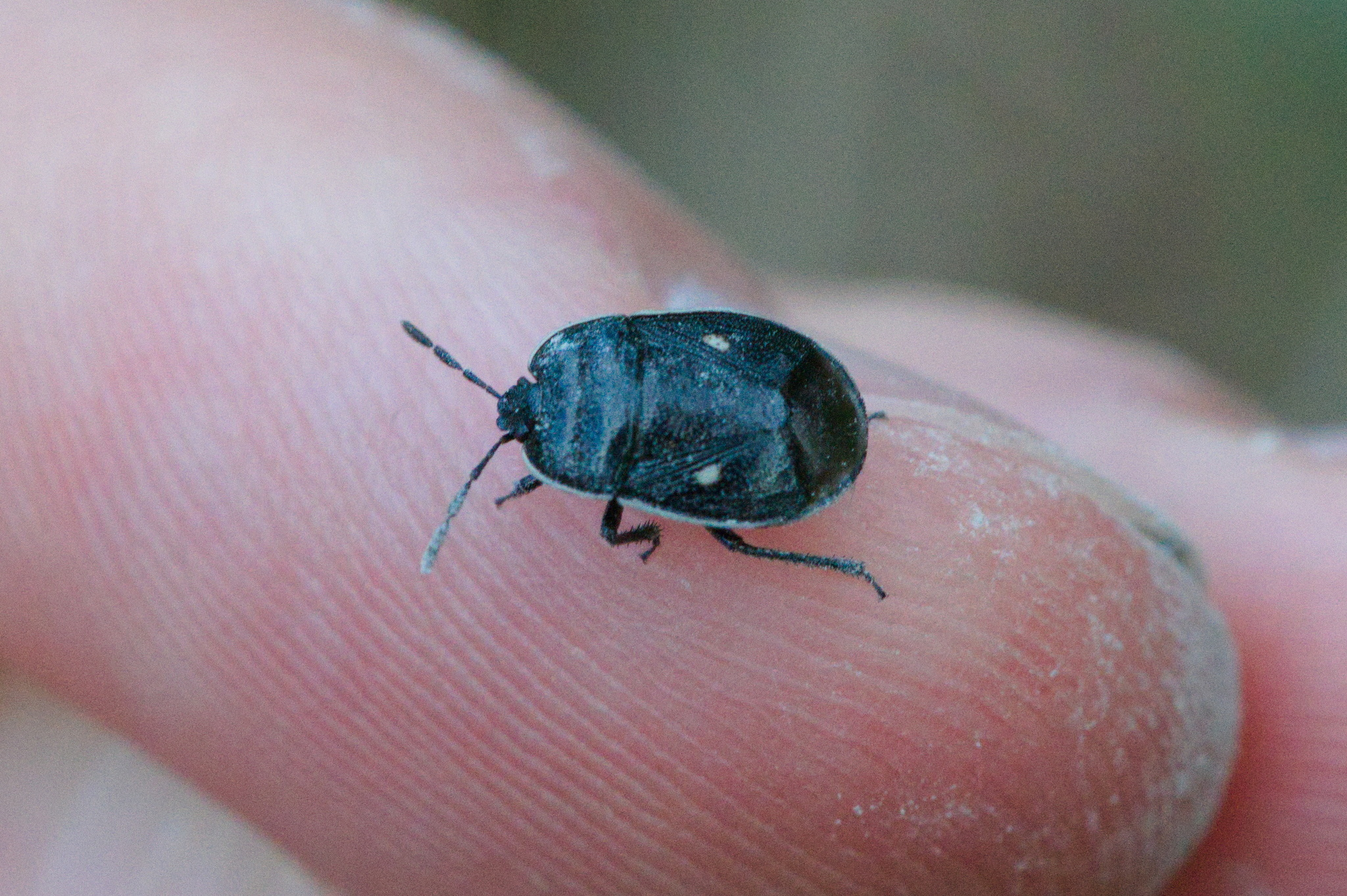

Scientific classification
- Kingdom: Animalia
- Phylum: Arthropoda
- Class: Insecta
- Order: Hemiptera
- Suborder: Heteroptera
- Family: Cydnidae
- Genus: Adomerus
- Species: A. biguttatus

Binomial name
- Adomerus biguttatus (Linnaeus, 1758)

Synonyms
- Cimex biguttatus Linnaeus, 1758; Cydnus biguttatus (Linnaeus, 1758); Sehirus biguttatus (Linnaeus, 1758)

= Adomerus biguttatus =

Species of true bug

Adomerus biguttatus, also known by its common name cow-wheat shieldbug is a species from the genus Adomerus.

The species is said to be nationally scarce across the UK, and in April 2021 was recorded in Scotland for only the eighth time, after an absence of more than thirty years.
