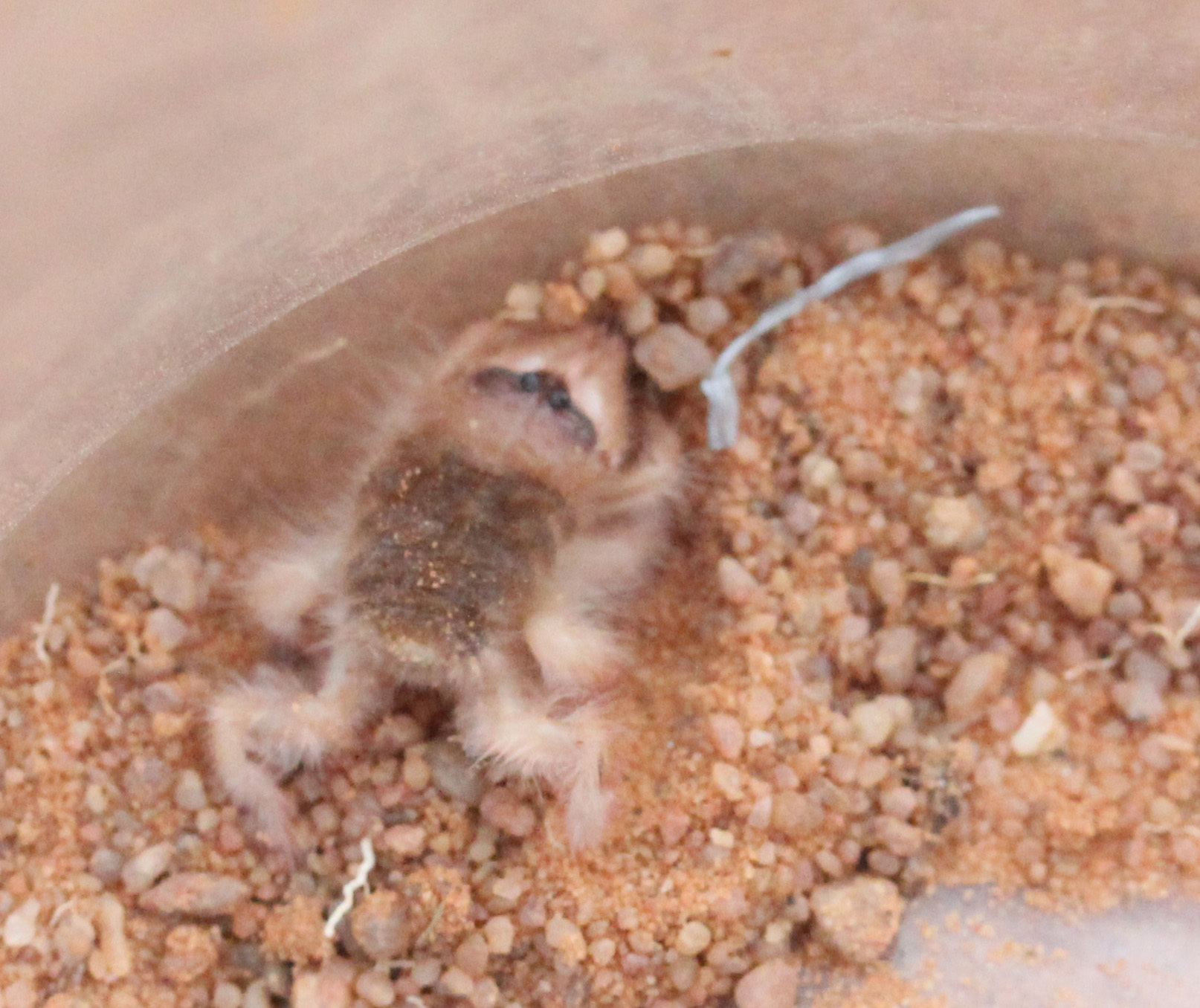
- Chelypus hirsti

Scientific classification
- Kingdom: Animalia
- Phylum: Arthropoda
- Subphylum: Chelicerata
- Class: Arachnida
- Order: Solifugae
- Family: Hexisopodidae
- Genus: Chelypus; Purcell, 1902

Type species
- Chelypus barberi Purcell, 1902

Species
- 8, see text

= Chelypus =

Genus of camel spiders

Chelypus ('clawfoot') is a genus of slow-moving, burrowing sunspiders confined to the deserts and arid regions of Southern Africa.

== Description ==
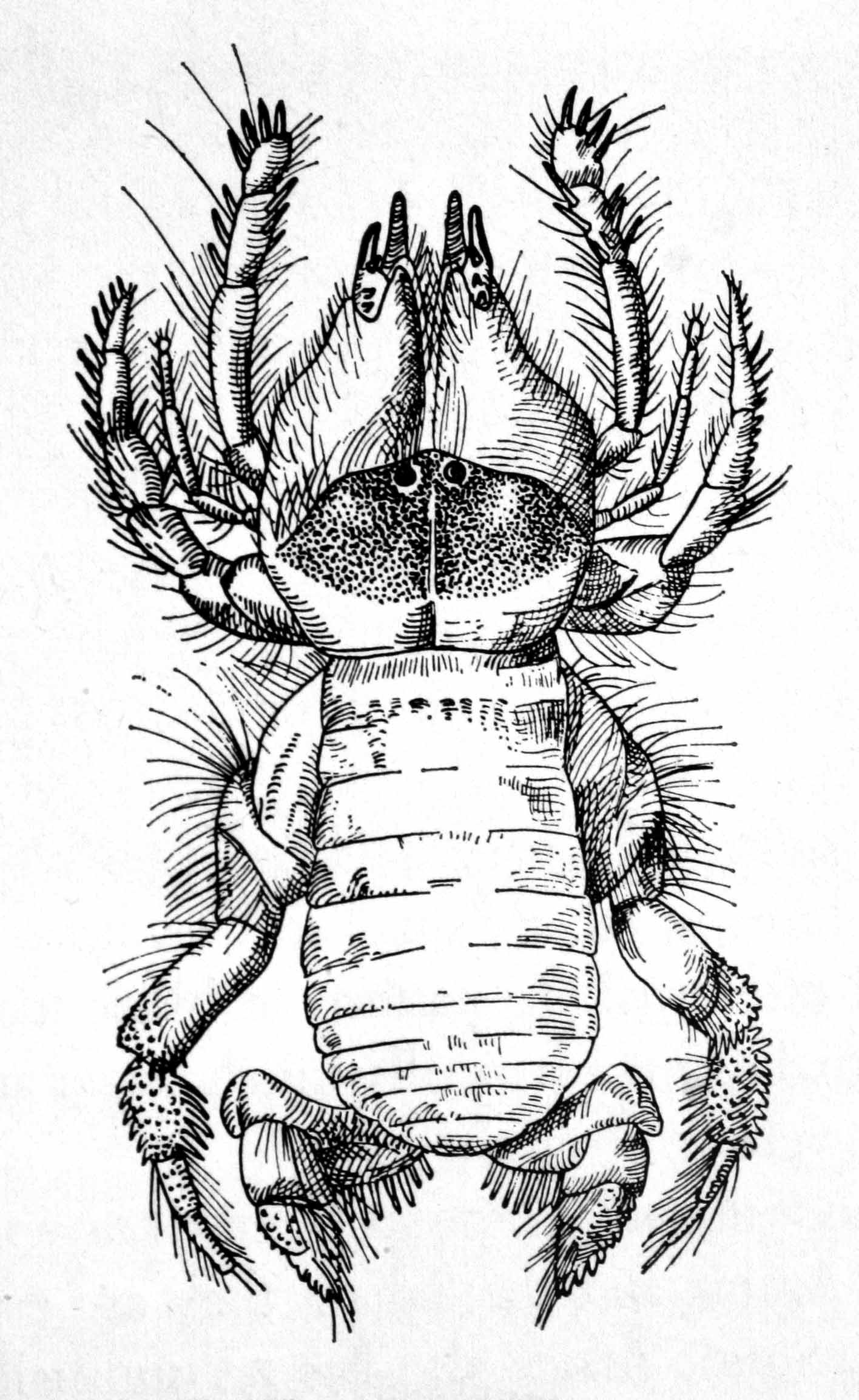
Chelypus sp., dorsal view

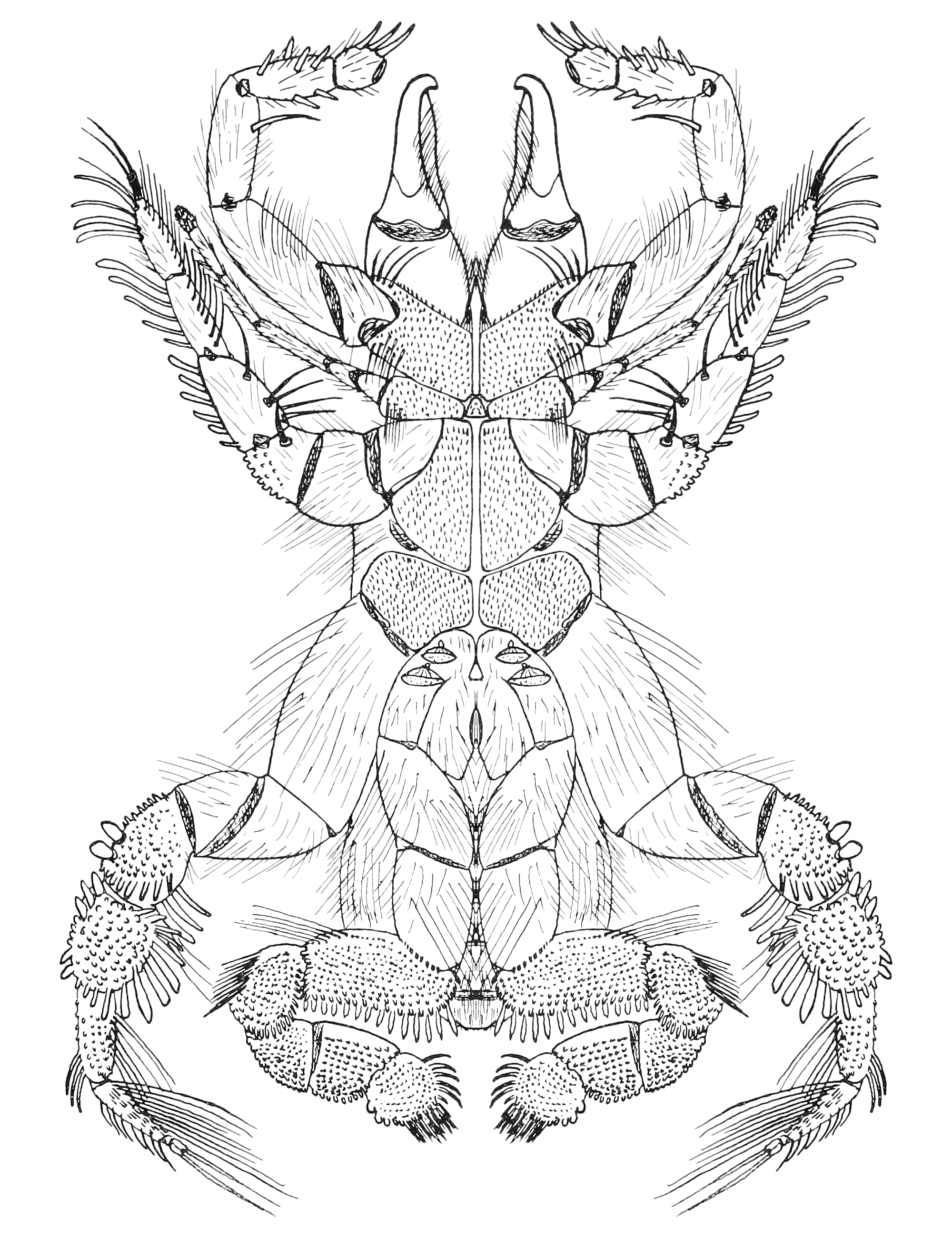
Chelypus macroceras, ventral view

They are readily separated from other Solifugae by an absence of claws on the fourth pair of legs. Both Chelypus, and the related genus Hexisopus spend a large part of their existence underground, and their 2nd, 3rd and particularly 4th pair of legs are shortened and robust, and equipped with rake-like spines for digging.

Members of the family Hexisopodidae differ markedly in morphology from those of other Solifugae families – most patently in their fossorial rather than cursorial legs. Such extreme modifications often blur relationships with other taxa, and hexisopodid genealogy is no exception. The main external difference between Chelypus and Hexisopus is the presence of well-developed spines on the pedipalps of Chelypus. Their subterranean way of life makes the family extremely difficult to study.

== Distribution ==
Members of the genus are found mainly in South Africa and Namibia but also in Angola, Zimbabwe, Zambia, and Botswana.

== Phylogeny ==
The current phylogeny of Solifugae is lacking in any subordinal or superfamilial arrangement and is largely based on the scheme put forward by Carl Friedrich Roewer in 1934, relying on highly variable characters at both genus and species level. Roewer's system has been challenged by various taxonomists and authors.

As of February 2023, the World Solifugae Catalog accepts the following eight species:

- Chelypus barberi Purcell, 1902 — Angola, Namibia, South Africa, Zimbabwe
- Chelypus eberlanzi Roewer, 1941 — Namibia
- Chelypus hirsti Hewitt, 1915 — Botswana, Namibia, South Africa
- Chelypus lawrencei Wharton, 1981 — Namibia
- Chelypus lennoxae Hewitt, 1912 — Namibia, South Africa
- Chelypus macroceras (Roewer, 1933) — Zambia
- Chelypus shortridgei Hewitt, 1931 — Namibia
- Chelypus wuehlischi Roewer, 1941 — Namibia

== Bibliography ==
- * Bibliography –
- "Catalogue of the Smaller Arachnid Orders of the World" - Mark S Harvey (Csiro Publishing, Collingwood, Victoria, Australia, 2003) ISBN 0 643 06805 8
- "The Arachnid Fauna of the Kalahari Gemsbok National Park – A Revision of the Species of "Mole Solifuges" of the genus Chelypus, Purcell, 1901" – Bruno H. Lamoral ("Koedoe" 16: 83-102 (1973))
