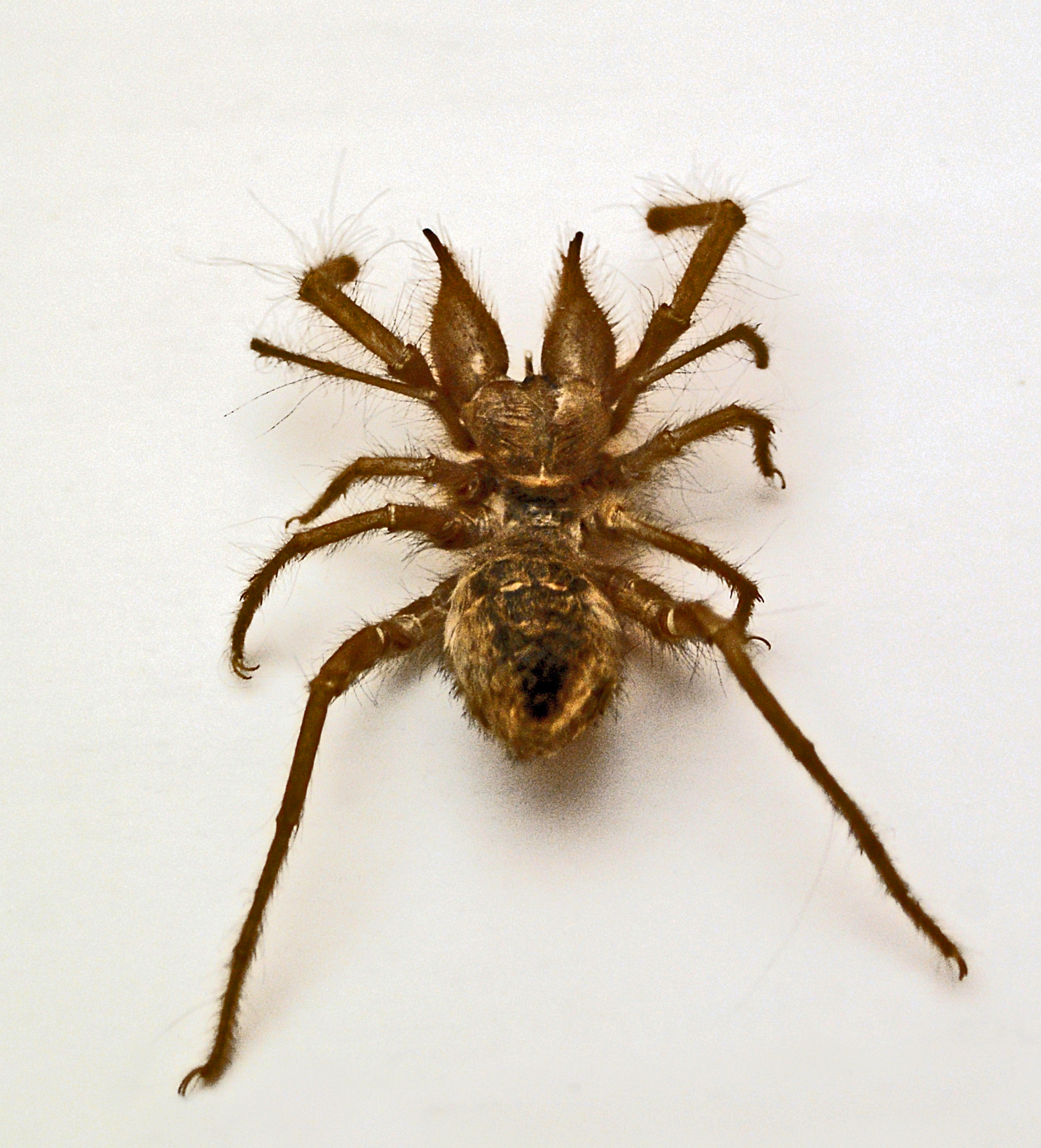
- Zeria loveridgei from Somalia

Scientific classification
- Kingdom: Animalia
- Phylum: Arthropoda
- Subphylum: Chelicerata
- Class: Arachnida
- Order: Solifugae
- Family: Solpugidae
- Genus: Zeria
- Species: Z. loveridgei

Binomial name
- Zeria loveridgei (Hewitt, 1925)

= Zeria loveridgei =

Species of spider-like animal

Zeria loveridgei is a species of solifuges or sun spiders. This species can be found in Somalia and Kenya.
