= Solpugyla =

Scientific classification
- Kingdom: Animalia
- Phylum: Arthropoda
- Subphylum: Chelicerata
- Class: Arachnida
- Order: Solifugae
- Family: Solpugidae
- Genus: Solpugyla; Roewer, 1933

Type species
- Solpugyla darlingii (Pocock, 1897)

Species
- 10, see text

Genus of camel spiders

Solpugyla is a genus of solpugid camel spiders, first described by Carl Friedrich Roewer in 1933.

== Species ==
As of August 2023, the World Solifugae Catalog accepts the following ten species:

- Solpugyla centralis (Hewitt, 1927) — Tanzania
- Solpugyla darlingii (Pocock, 1897) — Congo, Mozambique, South Africa, Zimbabwe
- Solpugyla globicornis (Kraepelin, 1899) — South Africa
- Solpugyla katangana Roewer, 1933 — Congo
- Solpugyla kigoma Roewer, 1961 — Tanzania
- Solpugyla maestrii Caporiacco, 1939 — Ethiopia, Somalia
- Solpugyla masienensis (Lawrence, 1929) — Mozambique
- Solpugyla scapulata Roewer, 1933 — Tanzania
- Solpugyla umtalica (Hewitt, 1914) — Congo, Mozambique, Zimbabwe
- Solpugyla vassei Roewer, 1933 — Mozambique, Tanzania
