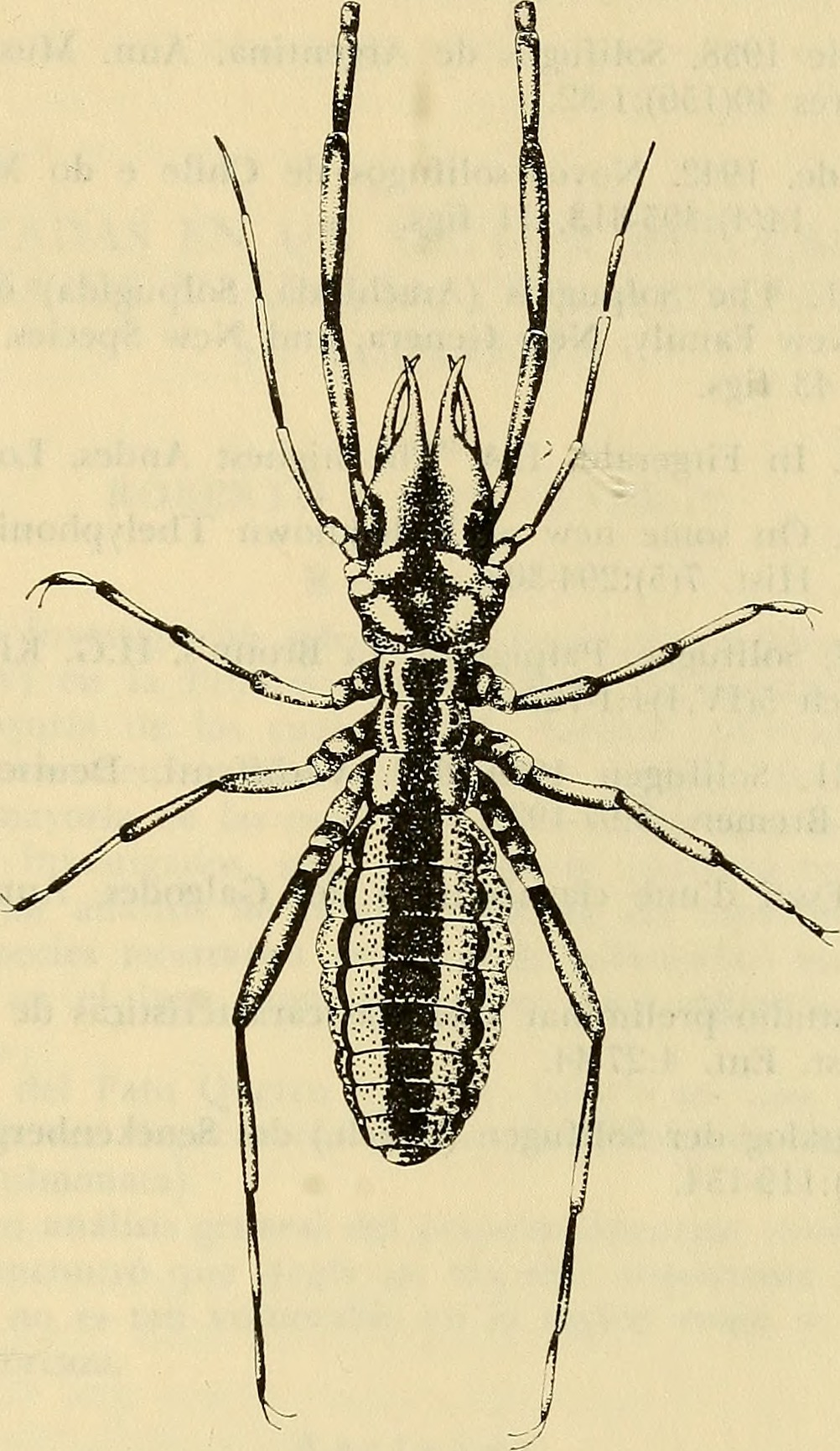
- Mummucia patagonica

Scientific classification
- Kingdom: Animalia
- Phylum: Arthropoda
- Subphylum: Chelicerata
- Class: Arachnida
- Order: Solifugae
- Family: Mummuciidae
- Genus: Mummucia; Simon, 1879

Type species
- Mummucia variegata (Gervais, 1849)

Species
- 8, see text

= Mummucia =

Genus of camel spiders

Mummucia is a genus of mummuciid camel spiders, first described by Eugène Simon in 1879.

== Species ==
As of April 2023, the World Solifugae Catalog accepts the following eight species:

- Mummucia coaraciandu Martins, Bonato, Machado, Pinto-da-Rocha & Rocha, 2004 — Brazil
- Mummucia dubia Badcock, 1932 — Paraguay
- Mummucia ibirapemussu Carvalho, Candiani, Bonaldo, Suesdek & Silva, 2010 — Brazil
- Mummucia mauryi Rocha, 2001 — Brazil
- Mummucia mendoza Roewer, 1934 — Argentina
- Mummucia patagonica Roewer, 1934 — Argentina, Chile
- Mummucia taiete Rocha & Carvalho, 2006 — Brazil
- Mummucia variegata (Gervais, 1849) — Bolivia, Chile, Peru
