= Prosolpuga =

Scientific classification
- Domain: Eukaryota
- Kingdom: Animalia
- Phylum: Arthropoda
- Subphylum: Chelicerata
- Class: Arachnida
- Order: Solifugae
- Family: Solpugidae
- Genus: Prosolpuga; Roewer, 1934
- Species: P. schultzei

Binomial name
- Prosolpuga schultzei (Kraepelin, 1908)

Genus of camel spiders

Prosolpuga is a monotypic genus of solpugid camel spiders, first described by Carl Friedrich Roewer in 1934. Its single species, Prosolpuga schultzei is distributed in Namibia.
