= Carapace =

Part of exoskeleton in some animals

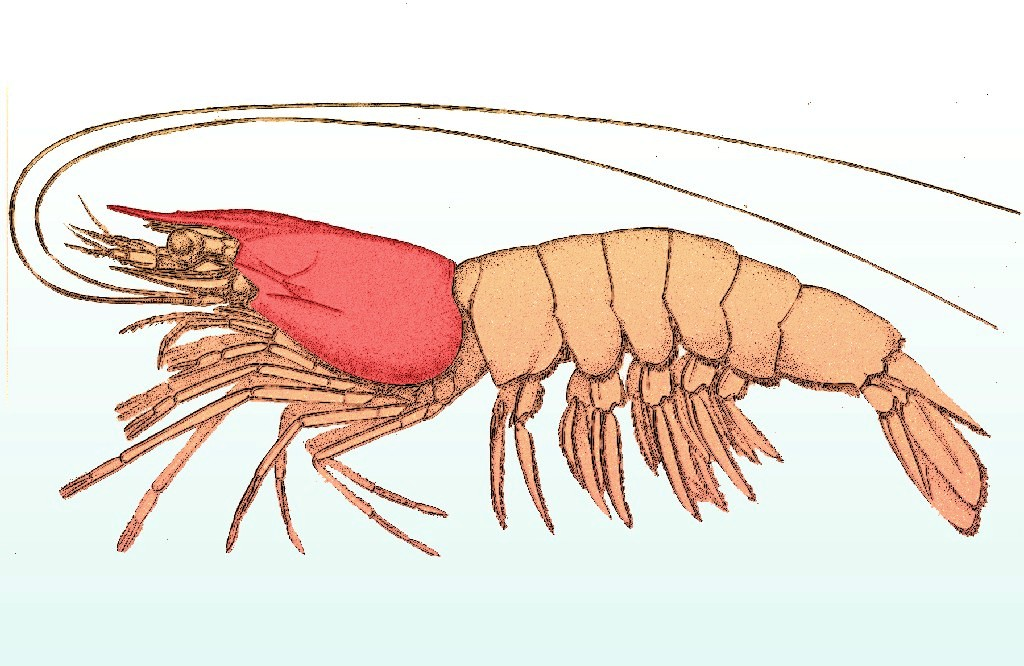
Diagram of a prawn, with the carapace highlighted in red

A carapace is the upper section (dorsal section) of the exoskeleton or shell in a number of animal groups, including arthropods (such as crustaceans and arachnids) and vertebrates, such as turtles and tortoises (in turtles and tortoises, the underside is called the plastron).

== Crustaceans ==
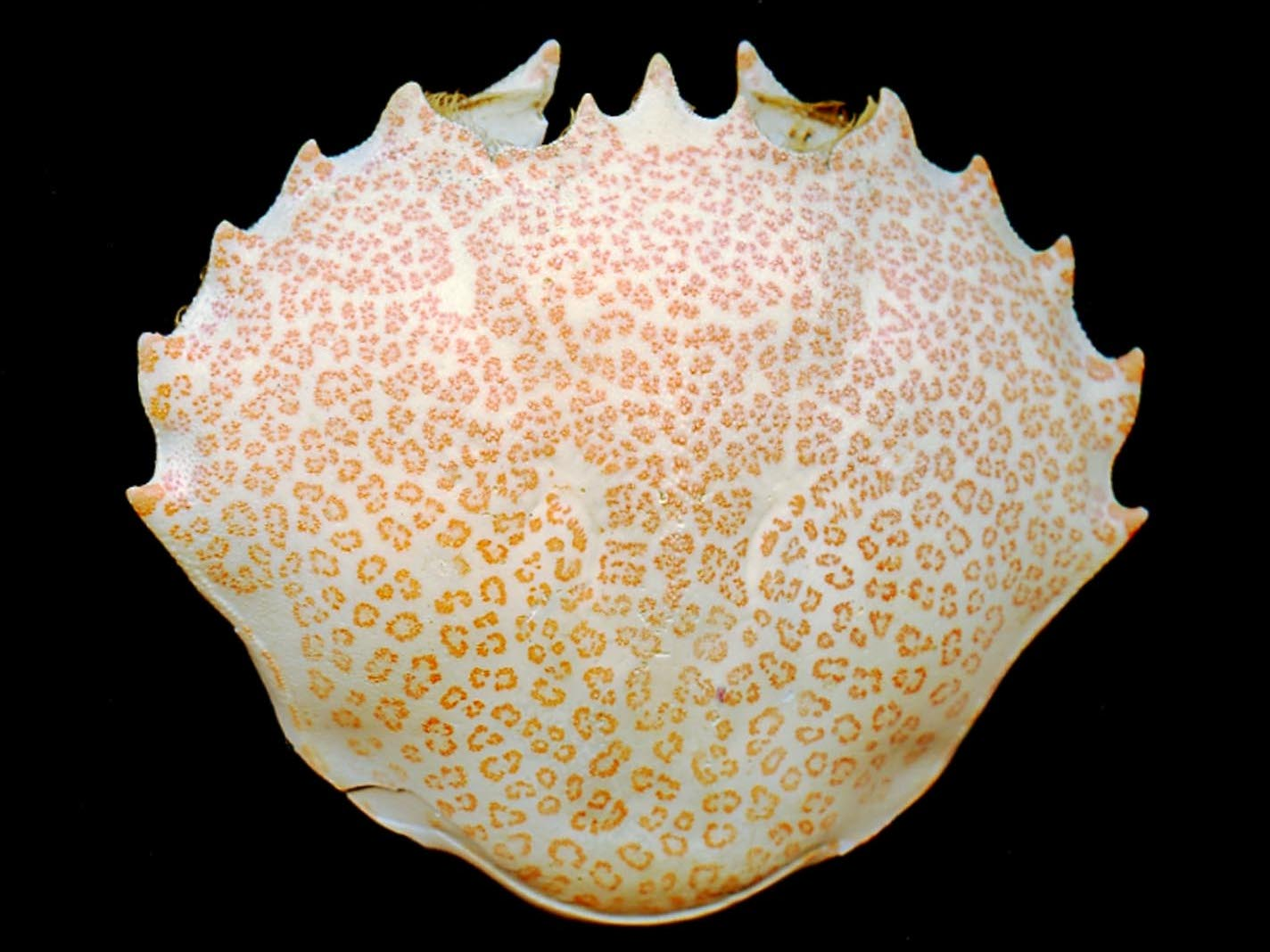
The molted carapace of a lady crab from Long Beach, New York

In crustaceans, the carapace functions as a protective cover over the cephalothorax (i.e., the fused head and thorax, as distinct from the abdomen behind). Where it projects forward beyond the eyes, this projection is called a rostrum. The carapace is calcified to varying degrees in different crustaceans.

Zooplankton within the phylum Crustacea also have a carapace. These include Cladocera, ostracods, and isopods, but isopods only have a developed "cephalic shield" carapace covering the head.

== Arachnids ==
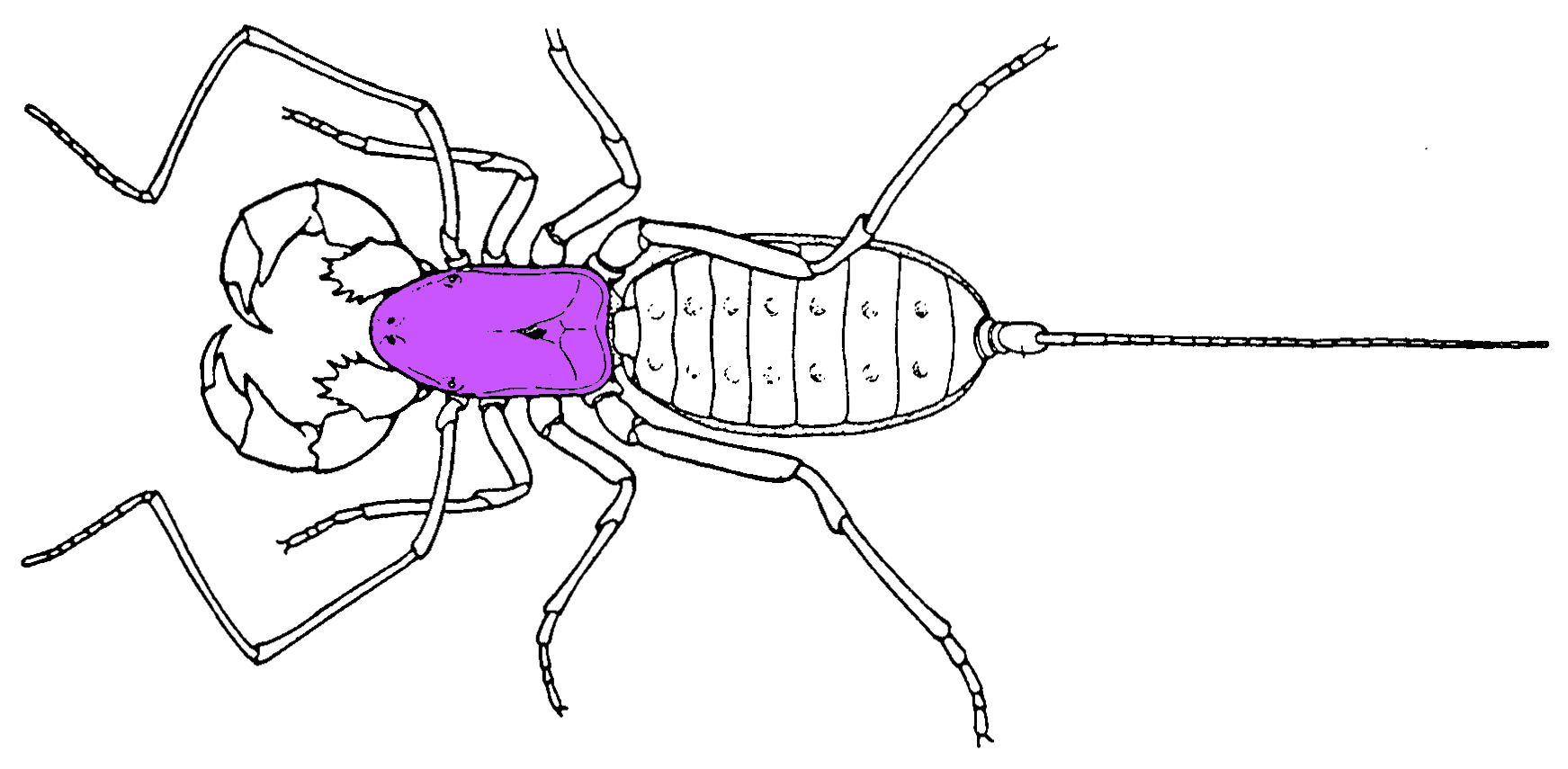
Diagram of an arachnid, with the carapace highlighted in purple

In arachnids, the carapace is formed by the fusion of prosomal tergites into a single plate which carries the eyes, ocularium, ozopores (a pair of openings of the scent gland of Opiliones) and diverse phaneres.

In a few orders, such as Solifugae and Schizomida, the carapace may be subdivided. In Opiliones, some authors prefer to use the term carapace interchangeably with the term cephalothorax, which is incorrect usage, because carapace refers only to the dorsal part of the exoskeleton of the cephalothorax.

Alternative terms for the carapace of arachnids and their relatives, which avoids confusion with crustaceans, are prosomal dorsal shield and peltidium.

== Turtles and tortoises ==
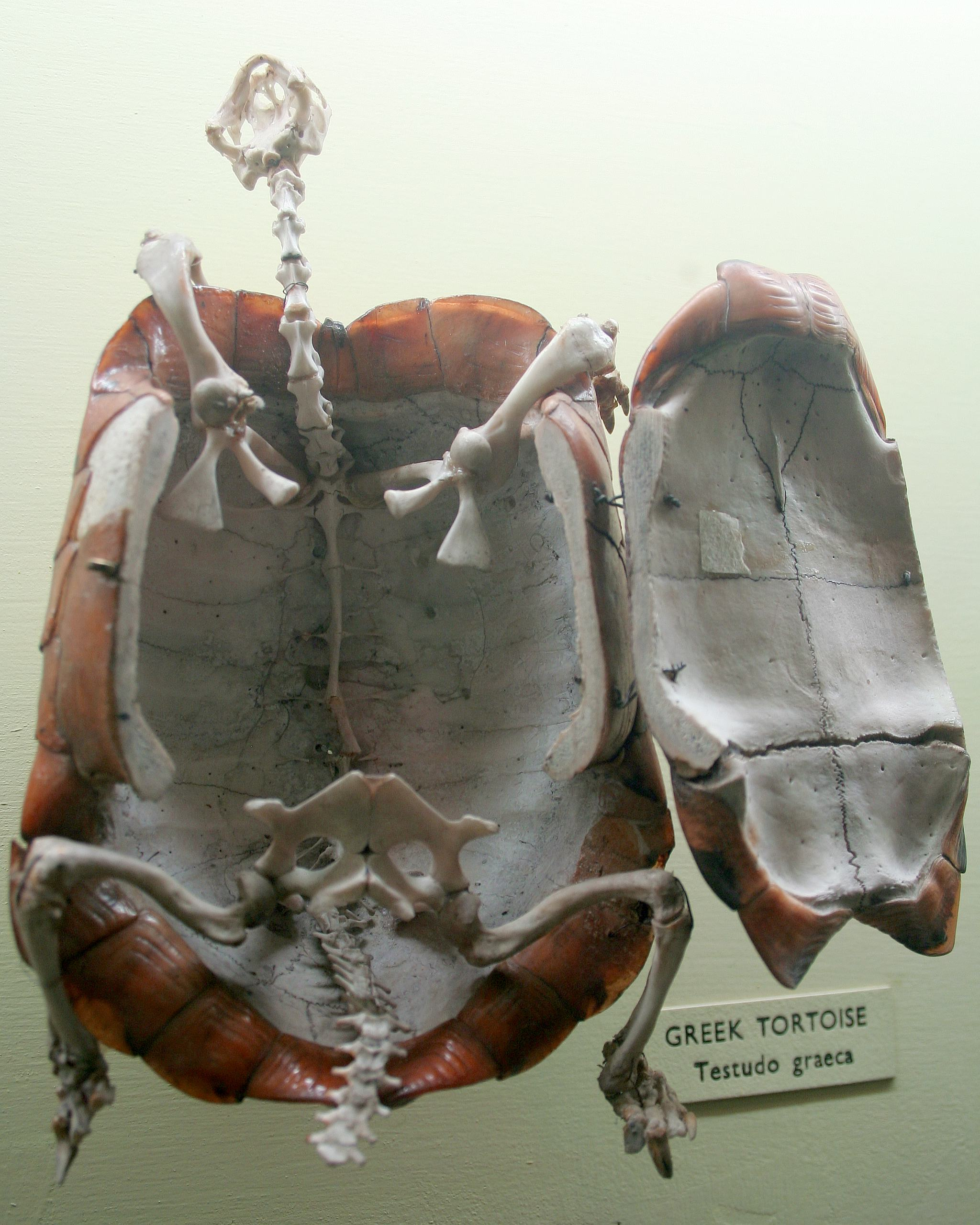
A Greek tortoise shell opened to show the skeleton from below

The carapace is the dorsal (back) convex part of the shell structure of a turtle, consisting primarily of the animal's rib cage, dermal armor, and scutes.

== See also ==
- Armour (zoology)
