= Eusimonia =

Scientific classification
- Domain: Eukaryota
- Kingdom: Animalia
- Phylum: Arthropoda
- Subphylum: Chelicerata
- Class: Arachnida
- Order: Solifugae
- Family: Karschiidae
- Genus: Eusimonia; Kraepelin, 1899

Type species
- Eusimonia nigrescens Kraepelin, 1899

Species
- 15, see text

Genus of camel spiders

Eusimonia is a genus of karschiid camel spiders, first described by Karl Kraepelin in 1899.

== Species ==
As of March 2023, the World Solifugae Catalog accepts the following fifteen species:

- Eusimonia arabica Roewer, 1933 — Yemen
- Eusimonia cornigera Panouse, 1955 — Morocco
- Eusimonia divina Birula, 1935 — Afghanistan, Iran, Kazakhstan, Turkmenistan, Uzbekistan
- Eusimonia fagei Panouse, 1956 — Morocco
- Eusimonia furcillata (Simon, 1872) — Cyprus, Israel, Syria
- Eusimonia kabiliana (Simon, 1879) — Algeria, Egypt, Israel
- Eusimonia mirabilis Roewer, 1933 — Libya, Morocco
- Eusimonia nigrescens Kraepelin, 1899 — Greece, Syria, Turkey
- Eusimonia orthoplax Kraepelin, 1899 — Algeria
- Eusimonia roeweri Panouse, 1957 — Morocco
- Eusimonia seistanica Roewer, 1933 — Iran
- Eusimonia serrifera Birula, 1905 — Iran
- Eusimonia turkestana Kraepelin, 1899 — China, Kazakhstan, Mongolia
- Eusimonia walsinghami (Hirst, 1910) — Algeria
- Eusimonia wunderlichi Pieper, 1977 — Spain
