= Gauchella =

Scientific classification
- Domain: Eukaryota
- Kingdom: Animalia
- Phylum: Arthropoda
- Subphylum: Chelicerata
- Class: Arachnida
- Order: Solifugae
- Family: Mummuciidae
- Genus: Gauchella; Mello-Leitão, 1937
- Species: G. stoeckeli

Binomial name
- Gauchella stoeckeli (Roewer, 1934)

Genus of camel spiders

Gauchella is a monotypic genus of mummuciid camel spiders, first described by Cândido Firmino de Mello-Leitão in 1937. Its single species, Gauchella stoeckeli is distributed in Bolivia.
