= Solpugassa =

Scientific classification
- Kingdom: Animalia
- Phylum: Arthropoda
- Subphylum: Chelicerata
- Class: Arachnida
- Order: Solifugae
- Family: Solpugidae
- Genus: Solpugassa; Roewer, 1933

Type species
- Solpugassa furcifera (Kraepelin, 1899)

Species
- 6, see text

Genus of camel spiders

Solpugassa is a genus of solpugid camel spiders, first described by Carl Friedrich Roewer in 1933.

== Species ==
As of August 2023, the World Solifugae Catalog accepts the following six species:

- Solpugassa clavata Roewer, 1933 — Congo
- Solpugassa dentatidens (Simon, 1879) — Djibouti, Ethiopia, Somalia, South Sudan
- Solpugassa furcifera (Kraepelin, 1899) — Angola, Namibia
- Solpugassa rudebecki Lawrence, 1961 — Angola
- Solpugassa signata (Roewer, 1934) — Djibouti, Ethiopia
- Solpugassa usambara Roewer, 1933 — Tanzania
