= Solpugeira =

Scientific classification
- Domain: Eukaryota
- Kingdom: Animalia
- Phylum: Arthropoda
- Subphylum: Chelicerata
- Class: Arachnida
- Order: Solifugae
- Family: Solpugidae
- Genus: Solpugeira; Roewer, 1933

Type species
- Solpugeira fuscorufa (Schenkel, 1932)

Species
- 2, see text

Genus of camel spiders

Solpugeira is a genus of solpugid camel spiders, first described by Carl Friedrich Roewer in 1933.

== Species ==
As of August 2023, the World Solifugae Catalog accepts the following two species:

- Solpugeira fuscorufa (Schenkel, 1932) — Ethiopia, Mozambique
- Solpugeira quarrei Roewer, 1950 — Congo
