= Solpuga =

Scientific classification
- Domain: Eukaryota
- Kingdom: Animalia
- Phylum: Arthropoda
- Subphylum: Chelicerata
- Class: Arachnida
- Order: Solifugae
- Family: Solpugidae
- Genus: Solpuga; Lichtenstein, 1796

Type species
- Solpuga chelicornis Lichtenstein, 1796

Species
- 32, see text

Genus of camel spiders

Solpuga is a genus of solpugid camel spiders, first described by Anton August Heinrich Lichtenstein in 1796.

== Species ==
As of August 2023, the World Solifugae Catalog accepts the following thirty-two species:

- Solpuga alstoni Purcell, 1902 — South Africa
- Solpuga angolensis (Roewer, 1933) — Angola
- Solpuga atriceps Lawrence, 1949 — South Africa
- Solpuga bechuanica Hewitt, 1914 — Botswana, Namibia
- Solpuga bovicornis Lawrence, 1929 — South Africa
- Solpuga brunnipes (Dufour, 1861) — Algeria, Ethiopia
- Solpuga butleri Pocock, 1895 — Congo
- Solpuga carvalhoi Lawrence, 1960 — Angola
- Solpuga centenariorum Frade, 1940 — Angola
- Solpuga chelicornis Lichtenstein, 1796 — Botswana, Namibia, South Africa
- Solpuga conservatorum (Lawrence, 1964) — South Africa
- Solpuga festae Borelli, 1925 — Libya
- Solpuga fitzsimonsi Lawrence, 1935 — South Africa
- Solpuga hewitti Hirst, 1916 — Congo
- Solpuga hispidicelis Lawrence, 1964 — Zimbabwe
- Solpuga machadoi Lawrence, 1960 — Angola
- Solpuga massaica Roewer, 1941 — Tanzania
- Solpuga matabelena Chamberlin, 1925 — Zimbabwe
- Solpuga mulongoa Benoit, 1960 — Congo
- Solpuga praedatrix Lawrence, 1968 — Botswana
- Solpuga richardi Roewer, 1950 — Congo
- Solpuga robusta Frade, 1940 — Guinea-Bissau
- Solpuga roeweri Fage, 1936 — Kenya
- Solpuga rufescens C.L. Koch, 1842 — South Africa
- Solpuga simplex Benoit, 1960 — Congo
- Solpuga suffusca Hewitt, 1916 — South Africa
- Solpuga truncata (Lawrence, 1968) — South Africa
- Solpuga upembana Roewer, 1952 — Congo
- Solpuga venosa Purcell, 1899 — South Africa
- Solpuga villosa Purcell, 1899 — South Africa
- Solpuga wittei Roewer, 1952 — Congo
- Solpuga zuluana Lawrence, 1937 — South Africa
