= Karschia =

- Karschia (arachnid), a genus of arachnids in the family Karschiidae
- Karschia (fungus), a genus of fungi in the class Dothideomycetes
