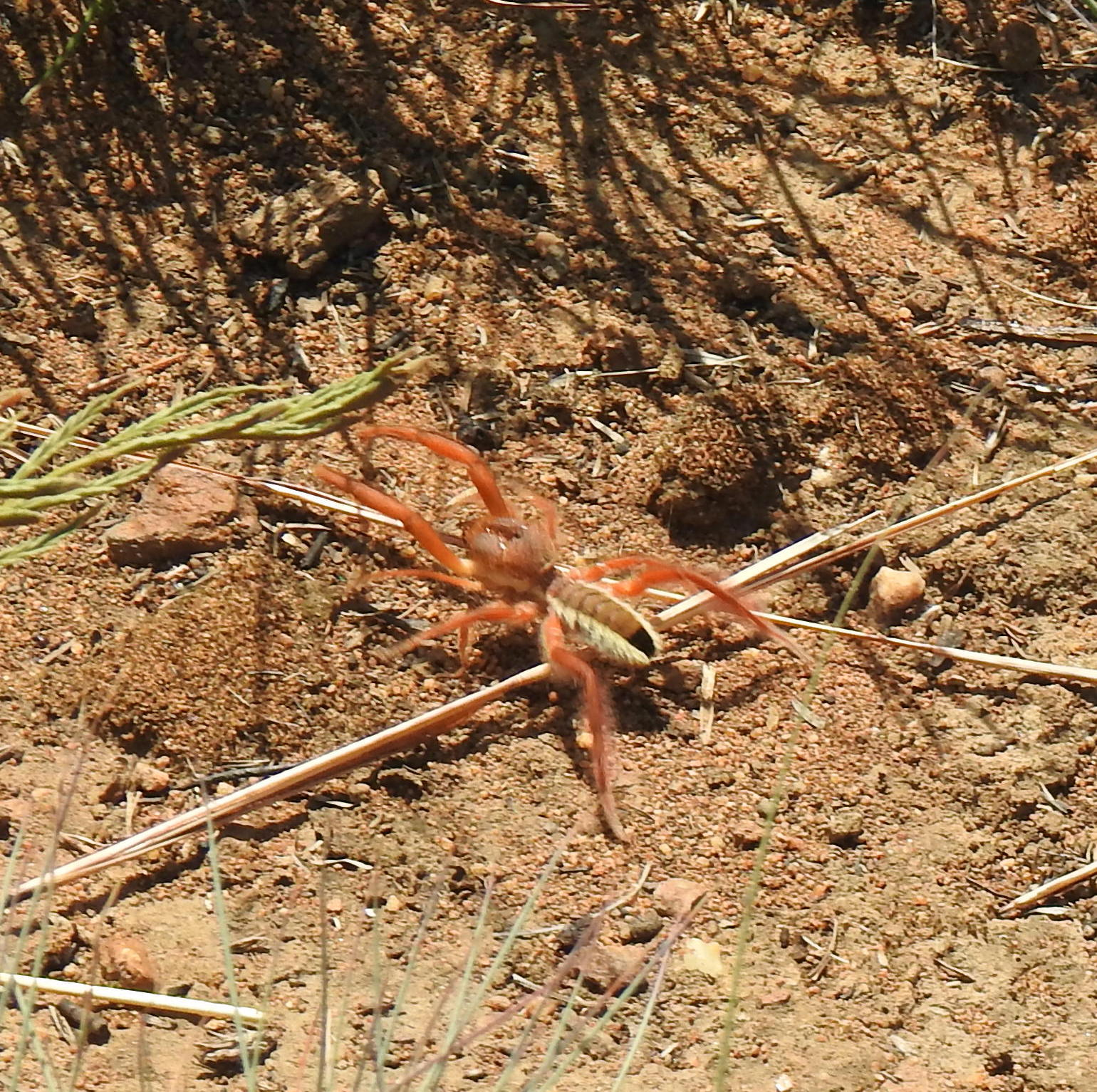
- Solpugema hostilis

Scientific classification
- Domain: Eukaryota
- Kingdom: Animalia
- Phylum: Arthropoda
- Subphylum: Chelicerata
- Class: Arachnida
- Order: Solifugae
- Family: Solpugidae
- Genus: Solpugema; Roewer, 1933

Type species
- Solpugema vincta (C.L. Koch, 1842)

Species
- 29, see text

= Solpugema =

Genus of camel spiders

Solpugema is a genus of solpugid camel spiders, first described by Carl Friedrich Roewer in 1933.

== Species ==
As of August 2023, the World Solifugae Catalog accepts the following twenty-nine species:

- Solpugema aethiops Lawrence, 1967 — Namibia
- Solpugema brachyceras (Lawrence, 1931) — South Africa
- Solpugema broadleyi Lawrence, 1965 — Zimbabwe
- Solpugema calycicornis (Lawrence, 1929) — South Africa
- Solpugema coquinae (Hewitt, 1914) — South Africa
- Solpugema cycloceras (Lawrence, 1931) — South Africa
- Solpugema derbiana (Pocock, 1895) — South Africa
- Solpugema erythronota (Kraepelin, 1900) — South Africa
- Solpugema erythronotoides (Hewitt, 1919) — South Africa
- Solpugema fissicornis Lawrence, 1968 — South Africa
- Solpugema genucornis (Lawrence, 1935) — Namibia, South Africa
- Solpugema hamata (Hewitt, 1914) — South Africa
- Solpugema hiatidens Lawrence, 1960 — Angola
- Solpugema hostilis (White, 1846) — Angola, Botswana, Lesotho, South Africa, Zimbabwe
- Solpugema intermedia (Lawrence, 1929) — South Africa
- Solpugema junodi (Purcell, 1903) — South Africa
- Solpugema krugeri Lawrence, 1964 — South Africa
- Solpugema lateralis (C.L. Koch, 1842) — Namibia, South Africa
- Solpugema maraisi (Hewitt, 1913) — South Africa
- Solpugema marshalli (Pocock, 1895) — South Africa, Zimbabwe
- Solpugema montana (Lawrence, 1929) — South Africa
- Solpugema phylloceras (Lawrence, 1929) — South Africa
- Solpugema scopulata (Karsch, 1880) — South Africa
- Solpugema spectralis (Purcell, 1899) — South Africa
- Solpugema stiloceras (Lawrence, 1929) — South Africa
- Solpugema tookei (Hewitt, 1919) — South Africa
- Solpugema tubicen (Kraepelin, 1911) — South Africa, Zimbabwe
- Solpugema vincta (C.L. Koch, 1842) — Angola, South Africa
- Solpugema whartoni Harvey, 2002 — Namibia
