= Zeriassa =

Scientific classification
- Domain: Eukaryota
- Kingdom: Animalia
- Phylum: Arthropoda
- Subphylum: Chelicerata
- Class: Arachnida
- Order: Solifugae
- Family: Solpugidae
- Genus: Zeriassa; Pocock, 1897

Type species
- Zeriassa bicolor (Pocock, 1897)

Species
- 17, see text

Genus of camel spiders

Zeriassa is a genus of solpugid camel spiders, first described by Reginald Innes Pocock in 1897.

== Species ==
As of August 2023, the World Solifugae Catalog accepts the following seventeen species:

- Zeriassa bicolor (Pocock, 1897) — Ethiopia, Kenya, Somalia, Tanzania
- Zeriassa cuneicornis (Purcell, 1899) — Angola, Namibia, Zimbabwe
- Zeriassa dubia Caporiacco, 1944 — Somalia
- Zeriassa furcicornis Lawrence, 1929 — South Africa
- Zeriassa inflexa Roewer, 1933 — Kenya, Tanzania
- Zeriassa intermedia Lawrence, 1953 — Kenya
- Zeriassa lawrencei Roewer, 1933 — Namibia
- Zeriassa lepida Kraepelin, 1913 — Somalia, Tanzania
- Zeriassa pardii Simonetta and Cave, 1968 — Somalia
- Zeriassa purcelli Hewitt, 1914 — South Africa
- Zeriassa ruspolii (Pavesi, 1897) — Ethiopia, Kenya, Somalia
- Zeriassa spinulosa Pocock, 1898 — Ethiopia, Kenya
- Zeriassa spiralis Roewer, 1933 — Congo
- Zeriassa sudanica Roewer, 1933 — Sudan
- Zeriassa transvaalensis Lawrence, 1964 — South Africa
- Zeriassa tuxeni Lawrence, 1965 — South Africa
- Zeriassa wabonica Roewer, 1933 — Kenya
