= Mummucipes =

Scientific classification
- Domain: Eukaryota
- Kingdom: Animalia
- Phylum: Arthropoda
- Subphylum: Chelicerata
- Class: Arachnida
- Order: Solifugae
- Family: Mummuciidae
- Genus: Mummucipes; Roewer, 1934
- Species: M. paraguayensis

Binomial name
- Mummucipes paraguayensis Roewer, 1934

Genus of camel spiders

Mummucipes is a monotypic genus of mummuciid camel spiders, first described by Carl Friedrich Roewer in 1934. Its single species, Mummucipes paraguayensis is distributed in Paraguay.
