= Vempironiella =

Scientific classification
- Domain: Eukaryota
- Kingdom: Animalia
- Phylum: Arthropoda
- Subphylum: Chelicerata
- Class: Arachnida
- Order: Solifugae
- Family: Mummuciidae
- Genus: Vempironiella; Botero-Trujillo, 2016
- Species: V. aguilari

Binomial name
- Vempironiella aguilari Botero-Trujillo, 2016

Genus of camel spiders

Vempironiella is a monotypic genus of mummuciid camel spiders, first described by Ricardo Botero-Trujillo in 2016. Its single species, Vempironiella aguilari is distributed in Peru.
