= Solpugiba =

Scientific classification
- Domain: Eukaryota
- Kingdom: Animalia
- Phylum: Arthropoda
- Subphylum: Chelicerata
- Class: Arachnida
- Order: Solifugae
- Family: Solpugidae
- Genus: Solpugiba; Roewer, 1934

Type species
- Solpugiba lineata (C.L. Koch, 1842)

Species
- 4, see text

Genus of camel spiders

Solpugiba is a genus of solpugid camel spiders, first described by Carl Friedrich Roewer in 1934.

== Species ==
As of August 2023, the World Solifugae Catalog accepts the following four species:

- Solpugiba arenicola Lawrence, 1964 — South Africa
- Solpugiba lineata (C.L. Koch, 1842) — Namibia, South Africa
- Solpugiba pictichelis (Roewer, 1934) — Botswana
- Solpugiba svatoshi (Birula, 1926) — Kenya
