= Oparbella =

Scientific classification
- Domain: Eukaryota
- Kingdom: Animalia
- Phylum: Arthropoda
- Subphylum: Chelicerata
- Class: Arachnida
- Order: Solifugae
- Family: Solpugidae
- Genus: Oparbella; Roewer, 1934

Type species
- Oparbella flavescens (C.L. Koch, 1842)

Species
- 7, see text

Genus of camel spiders

Oparbella is a genus of solpugid camel spiders, first described by Carl Friedrich Roewer in 1934.

== Species ==
As of August 2023, the World Solifugae Catalog accepts the following seven species:

- Oparbella aciculata (Simon, 1879) — Algeria, Israel, Tunisia
- Oparbella bicolor Roewer, 1934 — Tunisia
- Oparbella fagei Vachon, 1950 — Niger
- Oparbella flavescens (C.L. Koch, 1842) — North Africa
- Oparbella junquana Lawrence, 1966 — Algeria
- Oparbella quedenfeldti (Kraepelin, 1899) — Egypt, Morocco
- Oparbella werneri (Birula, 1914) — Algeria, Israel, Tunisia
