= Barrus =

Scientific classification
- Kingdom: Animalia
- Phylum: Arthropoda
- Subphylum: Chelicerata
- Class: Arachnida
- Order: Solifugae
- Family: Karschiidae
- Genus: Barrus; Simon, 1880
- Species: B. letourneuxi

Binomial name
- Barrus letourneuxi Simon, 1880

Genus of camel spiders

Barrus is a monotypic genus of karschiid camel spiders, first described by Eugène Simon in 1880. Its single species, Barrus letourneuxi is distributed in Egypt.
