= Gaucha (arachnid) =

Scientific classification
- Domain: Eukaryota
- Kingdom: Animalia
- Phylum: Arthropoda
- Subphylum: Chelicerata
- Class: Arachnida
- Order: Solifugae
- Family: Mummuciidae
- Genus: Gaucha; Mello-Leitão, 1924

Type species
- Gaucha fasciata Mello-Leitão, 1924

Species
- 7, see text

Genus of camel spiders

Gaucha is a genus of Mummuciid camel spiders, first described by Cândido Mello-Leitão in 1924.

== Species ==
As of January 2023, the World Solifugae Catalog accepts the following seven species:

- Gaucha avexada Botero-Trujillo, Ott & Carvalho, 2017 — Brazil
- Gaucha casuhati Botero-Trujillo, Ott & Carvalho, 2017 — Argentina
- Gaucha curupi Botero-Trujillo, Ott & Carvalho, 2017 — Brazil
- Gaucha eremolembra Botero-Trujillo, Ott & Carvalho, 2017 — Brazil
- Gaucha fasciata Mello-Leitão, 1924 — Argentina, Brazil, Uruguay
- Gaucha ramirezi Botero-Trujillo, Ott, Mattoni, Nime & Ojanguren-Affilastro, 2019 — Argentina
- Gaucha santana Botero-Trujillo, Ott, Mattoni, Nime & Ojanguren-Affilastro, 2019 — Brazil
