= Solpuguna =

Scientific classification
- Domain: Eukaryota
- Kingdom: Animalia
- Phylum: Arthropoda
- Subphylum: Chelicerata
- Class: Arachnida
- Order: Solifugae
- Family: Solpugidae
- Genus: Solpuguna; Roewer, 1933

Type species
- Solpuguna cervina (Purcell, 1899)

Species
- 5, see text

Genus of camel spiders

Solpuguna is a genus of solpugid camel spiders, first described by Carl Friedrich Roewer in 1933.

== Species ==
As of August 2023, the World Solifugae Catalog accepts the following five species:

- Solpuguna alcicornis (Kraepelin, 1914) — Namibia, South Africa
- Solpuguna browni (Lawrence, 1928) — Namibia
- Solpuguna cervina (Purcell, 1899) — Namibia, South Africa
- Solpuguna collinita (Purcell, 1903) — South Africa
- Solpuguna orangica Lawrence, 1964 — South Africa
