= Solpugisticella =

Scientific classification
- Domain: Eukaryota
- Kingdom: Animalia
- Phylum: Arthropoda
- Subphylum: Chelicerata
- Class: Arachnida
- Order: Solifugae
- Family: Solpugidae
- Genus: Solpugisticella; Turk, 1960
- Species: S. kenyae

Binomial name
- Solpugisticella kenyae Turk, 1960

Genus of camel spiders

Solpugisticella is a monotypic genus of solpugid camel spiders, first described by Frank Archibald Turk in 1960. Its single species, Solpugisticella kenyae is distributed in Kenya.
