= Ferrandia =

Scientific classification
- Domain: Eukaryota
- Kingdom: Animalia
- Phylum: Arthropoda
- Subphylum: Chelicerata
- Class: Arachnida
- Order: Solifugae
- Family: Solpugidae
- Genus: Ferrandia; Roewer, 1933

Type species
- Ferrandia ferrandii (Kraepelin, 1899)

Species
- 4, see text

Genus of camel spiders

Ferrandia is a genus of solpugid camel spiders, first described by Carl Friedrich Roewer in 1933.

== Species ==
As of August 2023, the World Solifugae Catalog accepts the following four species:

- Ferrandia arabica Lawrence, 1954 — Saudi Arabia
- Ferrandia birulae (Roewer, 1933) — Somalia
- Ferrandia ferrandii (Kraepelin, 1899) — Somalia
- Ferrandia robusta Lawrence, 1954 — Saudi Arabia
