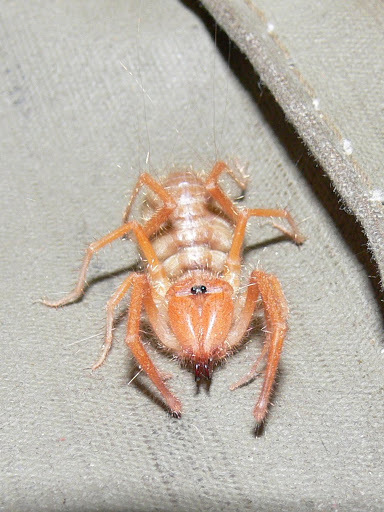
- Zeria monteiri from Botswana

Scientific classification
- Kingdom: Animalia
- Phylum: Arthropoda
- Subphylum: Chelicerata
- Class: Arachnida
- Order: Solifugae
- Family: Solpugidae
- Genus: Zeria; Simon, 1879

Type species
- Zeria persephone Simon, 1879

Species
- 60, see text

= Zeria =

Genus of camel spiders

Zeria is a genus of solpugid camel spiders, first described by Eugène Simon in 1879.

== Species ==
As of August 2023, the World Solifugae Catalog accepts the following sixty species:

- Zeria adunca (Roewer, 1933) — Namibia
- Zeria albistriata (Roewer, 1933) — Tanzania
- Zeria angolana (Frade, 1940) — Angola
- Zeria antelopicornis (Lawrence, 1929) — South Africa
- Zeria atra (Roewer, 1933) — Tanzania
- Zeria atrisoma (Roewer, 1933) — Tanzania
- Zeria boehmi (Kraepelin, 1899) — Congo
- Zeria caffra (Pocock, 1897) — South Africa
- Zeria capitulata (Karsch, 1885) — Congo, Ethiopia, Kenya
- Zeria carli (Roewer, 1933) — South Africa
- Zeria celeripes (Hirst, 1911) — South Africa, Zimbabwe
- Zeria davidi (Schenkel, 1932) — Mozambique
- Zeria farimia (Roewer, 1933) — Guinea-Bissau
- Zeria ferox (Pocock, 1895) — South Africa
- Zeria fordi (Hirst, 1907) — Congo, Ethiopia, Kenya, Sudan, Tanzania, Uganda
- Zeria funksoni (Birula, 1915) — Sudan
- Zeria fusca (C.L. Koch, 1842) — South Africa
- Zeria glabricornis (Lawrence, 1928) — Namibia
- Zeria greta (Roewer, 1933) — Tanzania
- Zeria incerta (Frade, 1940) — Angola
- Zeria kapangana (Benoit, 1960) — Congo
- Zeria keyserlingii (Pocock, 1895) — Cameroon, Guinea, Guinea-Bissau, Nigeria, Togo
- Zeria kraepelini (Roewer, 1933) — Tanzania
- Zeria langheldi (Roewer, 1933) — Namibia
- Zeria lawrencei (Roewer, 1933) — Angola, Namibia
- Zeria lethalis (C.L. Koch, 1842) — Namibia, South Africa
- Zeria lobatula (Roewer, 1933) — Tanzania
- Zeria loveridgei (Hewitt, 1925) — Ethiopia, Kenya, Somalia, Uganda
- Zeria merope (Simon, 1879) — Kenya, Tanzania
- Zeria meruensis (Tullgren, 1907) — Congo, Ethiopia, Tanzania
- Zeria monteiri (Pocock, 1895) — Angola, Botswana, Mozambique, Namibia, South Africa, Zimbabwe
- Zeria nasuta (Karsch, 1880) — Congo, Ethiopia, Kenya, Tanzania, Zimbabwe
- Zeria neumanni (Kraepelin, 1903) — Ethiopia
- Zeria niassa (Karsch, 1880) — Congo, Kenya, Malawi, Tanzania, Zambia
- Zeria nigrescens (Pocock, 1895) — Kenya, Mozambique
- Zeria obliqua (Roewer, 1933) — Namibia
- Zeria obscura (Kraepelin, 1899) — Congo, Ethiopia, Kenya, Tanzania
- Zeria orthoceras (Roewer, 1933) — Angola
- Zeria paludicola (Pocock, 1895) — Congo, Malawi, Mozambique, Tanzania
- Zeria parkinsoni (Pocock, 1897) — Ethiopia, Somalia
- Zeria persephone Simon, 1879 — Algeria, Morocco
- Zeria recta (Hewitt, 1919) — Namibia
- Zeria rhodesiana (Hirst, 1911) — Tanzania, Zimbabwe
- Zeria sagittaria (Pocock, 1900) — Botswana, Zimbabwe
- Zeria schlechteri (Purcell, 1899) — Namibia, South Africa
- Zeria schoenlandi (Pocock, 1900) — Namibia, South Africa, Zimbabwe
- Zeria schoutedeni (Roewer, 1954) — Congo
- Zeria schweinfurthi (Karsch, 1880) — South Sudan
- Zeria sericea (Pocock, 1897) — Angola, Congo, Namibia, South Africa, Zimbabwe
- Zeria serraticornis (Purcell, 1899) — Congo, Ethiopia, Mozambique, South Africa, Zimbabwe
- Zeria spiralicornis (Purcell, 1903) — South Africa, Zimbabwe
- Zeria strepsiceros (Kraepelin, 1899) — Mozambique, South Africa, Zimbabwe
- Zeria striata (Kraepelin, 1914) — Namibia
- Zeria sulfuripilosa (Roewer, 1933) — Kenya
- Zeria toppini (Hirst, 1916) — South Africa
- Zeria umbonata (Roewer, 1933) — Namibia
- Zeria vansoni (Lawrence, 1935) — Zimbabwe
- Zeria venator (Pocock, 1897) — Angola, Namibia, South Africa
- Zeria wabonica (Roewer, 1933) — Kenya
- Zeria zebrina (Pocock, 1898) — Kenya, Tanzania
