= Barrussus =

Scientific classification
- Domain: Eukaryota
- Kingdom: Animalia
- Phylum: Arthropoda
- Subphylum: Chelicerata
- Class: Arachnida
- Order: Solifugae
- Family: Karschiidae
- Genus: Barrussus; Roewer, 1928

Type species
- Barrussus furcichelis Roewer, 1928

Species
- 3, see text

Genus of camel spiders

Barrussus is a genus of karschiid camel spiders, first described by Carl Friedrich Roewer in 1928.

== Species ==
As of March 2023, the World Solifugae Catalog accepts the following three species:

- Barrussus furcichelis Roewer, 1928 — Greece
- Barrussus pentheri (Werner, 1905) — Turkey
- Barrussus telescopus Karataş & Uçak, 2013 — Turkey
