= Solpugella =

Scientific classification
- Domain: Eukaryota
- Kingdom: Animalia
- Phylum: Arthropoda
- Subphylum: Chelicerata
- Class: Arachnida
- Order: Solifugae
- Family: Solpugidae
- Genus: Solpugella; Roewer, 1933

Type species
- Solpugella asiatica Roewer, 1933

Species
- 5, see text

Genus of camel spiders

Solpugella is a genus of solpugid camel spiders, first described by Carl Friedrich Roewer in 1933.

== Species ==
As of August 2023, the World Solifugae Catalog accepts the following five species:

- Solpugella anchietae Frade, 1940 — Angola, Congo
- Solpugella asiatica Roewer, 1933 — Israel, Syria, Turkey
- Solpugella dissentanea Roewer, 1933 — Congo
- Solpugella mubalea Roewer, 1952 — Congo
- Solpugella ruandana Roewer, 1941 — Rwanda
