= Oparba =

Scientific classification
- Domain: Eukaryota
- Kingdom: Animalia
- Phylum: Arthropoda
- Subphylum: Chelicerata
- Class: Arachnida
- Order: Solifugae
- Family: Solpugidae
- Genus: Oparba; Roewer, 1934

Type species
- Oparba maroccana (Kraepelin, 1899)

Species
- 4, see text

Genus of camel spiders

Oparba is a genus of solpugid camel spiders, first described by Carl Friedrich Roewer in 1934.

== Species ==
As of August 2023, the World Solifugae Catalog accepts the following four species:

- Oparba asiatica (Turk, 1948) — Israel
- Oparba brunnea (Roewer, 1934) — Togo
- Oparba maroccana (Kraepelin, 1899) — Morocco, Nigeria, Togo
- Oparba togona (Roewer, 1934) — Togo
