= Cordobulgida =

Scientific classification
- Domain: Eukaryota
- Kingdom: Animalia
- Phylum: Arthropoda
- Subphylum: Chelicerata
- Class: Arachnida
- Order: Solifugae
- Family: Mummuciidae
- Genus: Cordobulgida; Mello-Leitão, 1938
- Species: C. bruchi

Binomial name
- Cordobulgida bruchi Mello-Leitão, 1938

Genus of camel spiders

Cordobulgida is a monotypic genus of mummuciid camel spiders, first described by Cândido Firmino de Mello-Leitão in 1938. Its single species, Cordobulgida bruchi is distributed in Argentina.
