= Solpugista =

Scientific classification
- Domain: Eukaryota
- Kingdom: Animalia
- Phylum: Arthropoda
- Subphylum: Chelicerata
- Class: Arachnida
- Order: Solifugae
- Family: Solpugidae
- Genus: Solpugista; Roewer, 1934

Type species
- Solpugista hastata (Kraepelin, 1899)

Species
- 4, see text

Genus of camel spiders

Solpugista is a genus of solpugid camel spiders, first described by Carl Friedrich Roewer in 1934.

== Species ==
As of August 2023, the World Solifugae Catalog accepts the following four species:

- Solpugista bicolor (Lawrence, 1953) — Namibia
- Solpugista hastata (Kraepelin, 1899) — Namibia
- Solpugista methueni (Hewitt, 1914) — Namibia
- Solpugista namibica Kraus, 1956 — Namibia
