= Mummucina =

Scientific classification
- Domain: Eukaryota
- Kingdom: Animalia
- Phylum: Arthropoda
- Subphylum: Chelicerata
- Class: Arachnida
- Order: Solifugae
- Family: Mummuciidae
- Genus: Mummucina; Roewer, 1934

Type species
- Mummucina titschacki Roewer, 1934

Species
- 6, see text

Genus of camel spiders

Mummucina is a genus of mummuciid camel spiders, first described by Carl Friedrich Roewer in 1934.

== Species ==
As of April 2023, the World Solifugae Catalog accepts the following six species:

- Mummucina colinalis Kraus, 1966 — Chile
- Mummucina exlineae Mello-Leitão, 1943 — Peru
- Mummucina masculina Lawrence, 1954 — Peru
- Mummucina puna Reyes, Ximena & Corronca, 2013 — Argentina
- Mummucina romero Kraus, 1966 — Chile
- Mummucina titschacki Roewer, 1934 — Ecuador
