= Boreosolifugae =

Scientific classification
- Kingdom: Animalia
- Phylum: Arthropoda
- Subphylum: Chelicerata
- Class: Arachnida
- Order: Solifugae
- Suborder: Boreosolifugae; Kulkarni et al., 2023

Suborder of arachnids

Boreosolifugae is a suborder of animals in the order Solifugae. In 2023, the internal phylogeny of solifuges was resolved for the first time using phylogenomics. The molecular phylogeny of the order showed evidence for two groups of families, which were recognized as suborders. Boreosolifugae comprises five families, predominantly from the Northern Hemisphere:

- Eremobatidae Kraepelin, 1901
- Galeodidae Sundevall, 1833
- Gylippidae Roewer, 1933
- Karschiidae Kraepelin, 1899
- Rhagodidae Pocock, 1897

The taxonomy of the Protosolpugidae remains uncertain.
