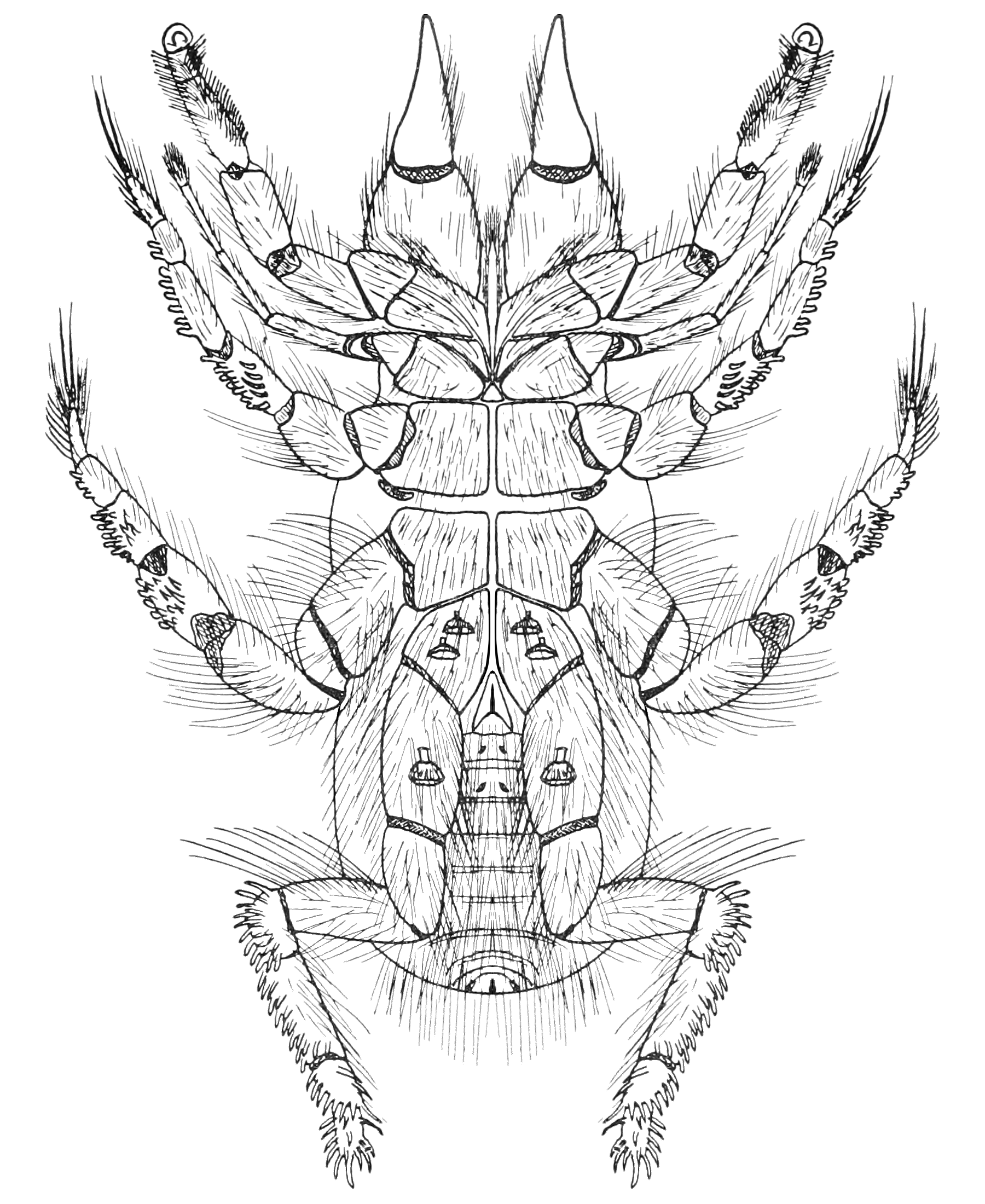
- Ventral view of Hexisopus fodiens

Scientific classification
- Domain: Eukaryota
- Kingdom: Animalia
- Phylum: Arthropoda
- Subphylum: Chelicerata
- Class: Arachnida
- Order: Solifugae
- Family: Hexisopodidae
- Genus: Hexisopus; Karsch, 1879

Type species
- Hexisopus lanatus (C.L. Koch, 1842)

Species
- 15, see text

= Hexisopus =

Genus of camel spiders

Hexisopus is a genus of hexisopodid camel spiders, first described by Ferdinand Karsch in 1879.

== Species ==
As of March 2023, the World Solifugae Catalog accepts the following fifteen species:

- Hexisopus abnormis (Roewer, 1932) — Angola
- Hexisopus aureopilosus Lawrence, 1968 — Namibia
- Hexisopus crassus Purcell, 1899 — South Africa
- Hexisopus eberlanzi (Roewer, 1941) — Namibia
- Hexisopus fodiens Simon, 1888 — Botswana
- Hexisopus fumosus Lawrence, 1967 — Namibia
- Hexisopus infuscatus Kraepelin, 1899 — Namibia
- Hexisopus lanatus (C.L. Koch, 1842) — Namibia, South Africa
- Hexisopus moiseli Lamoral, 1972 — Namibia
- Hexisopus nigrolunatus Kraepelin, 1899 — Namibia
- Hexisopus nigroplagiatus Lawrence, 1972 — Namibia
- Hexisopus psammophilus Wharton, 1981 — Namibia
- Hexisopus pusillus Lawrence, 1962 — Namibia
- Hexisopus reticulatus Purcell, 1902 — South Africa
- Hexisopus swarti Lawrence, 1968 — Namibia
