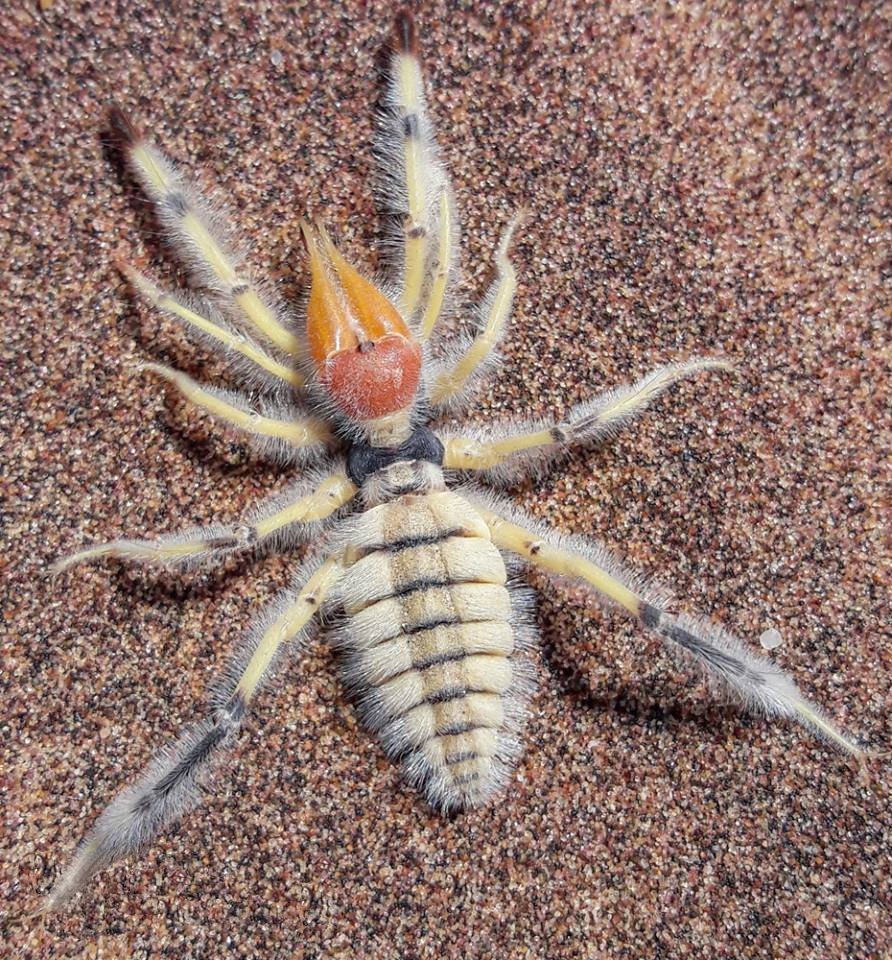

Scientific classification
- Domain: Eukaryota
- Kingdom: Animalia
- Phylum: Arthropoda
- Subphylum: Chelicerata
- Class: Arachnida
- Order: Solifugae
- Family: Solpugidae
- Genus: Metasolpuga; Roewer, 1934
- Species: M. picta

Binomial name
- Metasolpuga picta (Kraepelin, 1899)

= Metasolpuga =

Genus of spider-like animals

Metasolpuga is a genus of solifuge or sun spider. The monotypic genus contains the species Metasolpuga picta which is native to Namibia. It is one of several large, diurnal solifuge species that occur in the arid regions of southern Africa.

Its habitat is interdune valleys of the Namib Desert. They are active when ground surface temperatures are between 40 and 61 °C. In experimental conditions they become lethargic at 20 ± 1 °C, and at 5 to 10 °C they become completely torpid. During mid-winter it is believed to become lethargic in burrows for days or weeks. Egg depositing has been recorded during early spring and late summer. Data suggests that male M. picta are short-lived and die after the mating season due to high energy demands and low food intake.
