= Karschiidae =

- Male and female Karschia shannan

Scientific classification
- Kingdom: Animalia
- Phylum: Arthropoda
- Subphylum: Chelicerata
- Class: Arachnida
- Order: Solifugae
- Suborder: Boreosolifugae
- Family: Karschiidae; Kraepelin, 1899

Family of spider-like organisms

Karschiidae is a family of solifuges, first described by Karl Kraepelin in 1899.

== Genera ==
As of October 2022, the World Solifugae Catalog accepts the following four genera:

- Barrus Simon, 1880
- Barrussus Roewer, 1928
- Eusimonia Kraepelin, 1899
- Karschia Walter, 1889
