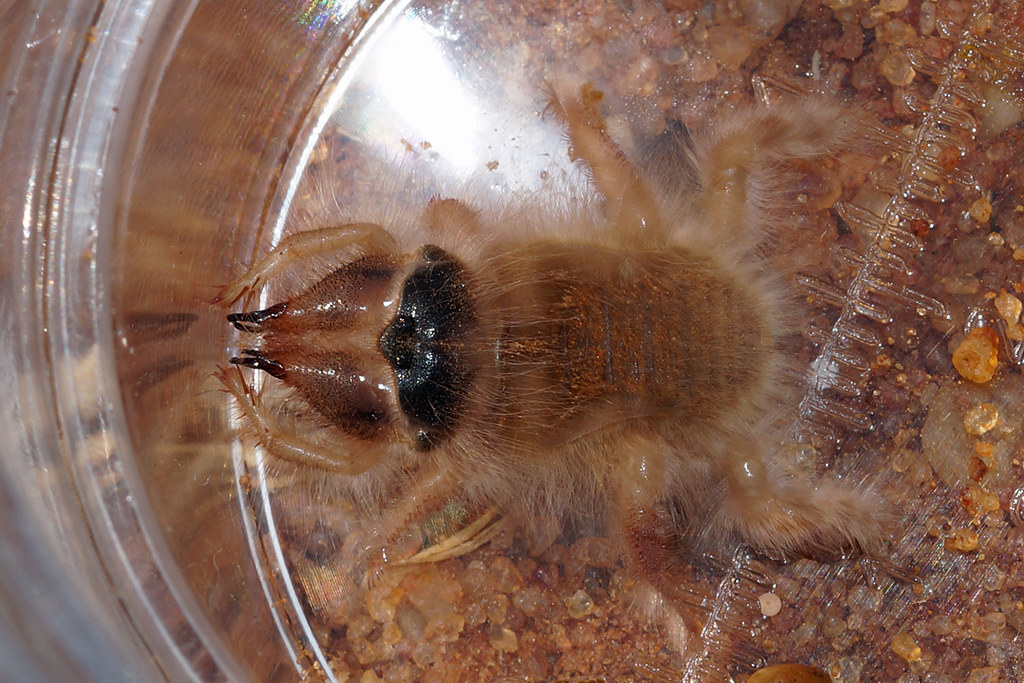
- Chelypus sp.

Scientific classification
- Domain: Eukaryota
- Kingdom: Animalia
- Phylum: Arthropoda
- Subphylum: Chelicerata
- Class: Arachnida
- Order: Solifugae
- Family: Hexisopodidae; Pocock, 1897

= Hexisopodidae =

Family of spider-like animals

Hexisopodidae is a family of solifuges, first described by Reginald Innes Pocock in 1897.

== Genera ==
As of October 2022, the World Solifugae Catalog accepts the following two genera:

- Chelypus Purcell, 1902
- Hexisopus Karsch, 1879
