= Karschia (arachnid) =

Scientific classification
- Kingdom: Animalia
- Phylum: Arthropoda
- Subphylum: Chelicerata
- Class: Arachnida
- Order: Solifugae
- Family: Karschiidae
- Genus: Karschia; Walter, 1889

Type species
- Karschia cornifera Walter, 1899

Species
- 26, see text

Genus of camel spiders

Karschia is a genus of karschiid camel spiders, first described by Alfred Walter in 1889.

== Species ==
As of January 2023, the World Solifugae Catalog accepts twenty-six species, which are listed below plus amendments:

- Karschia badkhyzica Gromov, 1998 — Turkmenistan
- Karschia birulae Roewer, 1934 — China (Xinjiang)
- Karschia borszczevskii Birula, 1935 — Uzbekistan
- Karschia caucasica (L. Koch, 1878) — Azerbaijan
- Karschia cornifera Walter, 1899 — Turkmenistan
- Karschia dingye Fan et al., 2024a — China (Xizang).
- Karschia gobiensis Gromov, 2004 — Mongolia
- Karschia gurkoi Gromov, 2004 — Tajikistan
- Karschia kaznakovi Birula, 1922 — Turkmenistan, Uzbekistan
- Karschia kiritshenkoi Birula, 1922 — Iran
- Karschia koenigi Birula, 1922 — Turkmenistan
- Karschia kononenkoi Gromov, 2004 — Uzbekistan
- Karschia kopetdaghica Gromov, 1998 — Turkmenistan
- Karschia kurdistanica Birula, 1935 — Iran, Iraq
- Karschia lhasa Fan et al., 2024a — China (Xizang).
- Karschia liui Fang et al., 2024b — — China (Gansu).
- Karschia mangistauensis Gromov, 1993 — Kazakhstan
- Karschia mastigofera Birula, 1890 — Armenia, Azerbaijan, Georgia, Turkey
- Karschia mongolica Roewer, 1933 — Mongolia
- Karschia namling Fan et al., 2024a — China (Xizang).
- Karschia nasuta Kraepelin, 1899 — Kyrgyzstan
- Karschia nubigena Lawrence, 1954 — Nepal [?] and/or China (Xizang)
- Karschia pedaschenkoi Birula, 1922 — Kyrgyzstan
- Karschia persica Kraepelin, 1899 — Iran
- Karschia rhinoceros Birula, 1922 — China (Xinjiang), Tajikistan
- Karschia shigatse Fan et al., 2024a — China (Xizang)
- Karschia tadzhika Gromov, 2004 — Tajikistan
- Karschia tarimina Roewer, 1933 — China (Xinjiang)
- Karschia tibetana Hirst, 1907 — China (Xizang)
- Karschia tienschanica Roewer, 1933 — China (Xinjiang)
- Karschia zarudnyi Birula, 1922 — Kazakhstan, Kyrgyzstan, Tajikistan, Uzbekistan
- Karschia zhui Fan et al., 2024a — China (Xizang).
