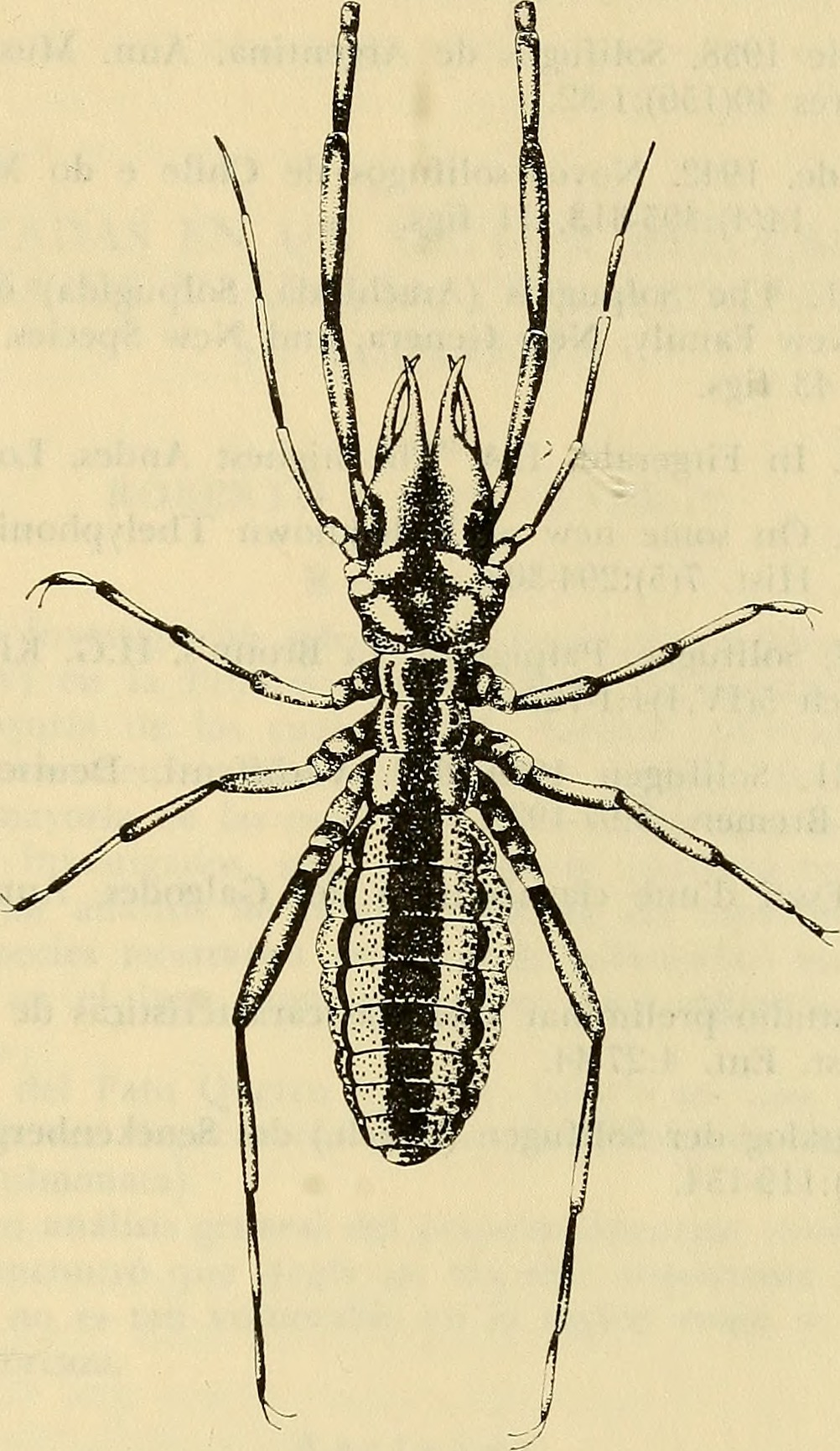
- Mummucia patagonica

Scientific classification
- Domain: Eukaryota
- Kingdom: Animalia
- Phylum: Arthropoda
- Subphylum: Chelicerata
- Class: Arachnida
- Order: Solifugae
- Family: Mummuciidae; Roewer, 1934

Genera
- See text

= Mummuciidae =

Family of spider-like organisms

Mummuciidae is a family of solifuges, first described by Carl Friedrich Roewer in 1934.

== Genera ==
As of January 2023, the World Solifugae Catalog accepts the following ten genera:

- Cordobulgida Mello-Leitão, 1938
- Curanahuel Botero-Trujillo, 2019
- Gaucha Mello-Leitão, 1924
- Gauchella Mello-Leitão, 1937
- Metacleobis Roewer, 1934
- Mummucia Simon, 1879
- Mummucina Roewer, 1934
- Mummucipes Roewer, 1934
- Uspallata Mello-Leitão, 1938
- Vempironiella Botero-Trujillo, 2016
