= Peltidium =

Chelicerata prodorsal shield

Peltidium is a prodorsal shield found in animals of the subphylum Chelicerata, in the phylum Arthropoda. In some groups (Schizomida, Palpigradi, Solpugida and Opiliones), the peltidium, also known as the schizopeltid, can be subdivided into the propeltidium, a carapace-like shield that covers the proterosoma, which comprises the fused acron (protocerebral region) and first four segments, and two free segments, the mesopeltidium and metapeltidium (Online Dictionary of Invertebrate Zoology).
