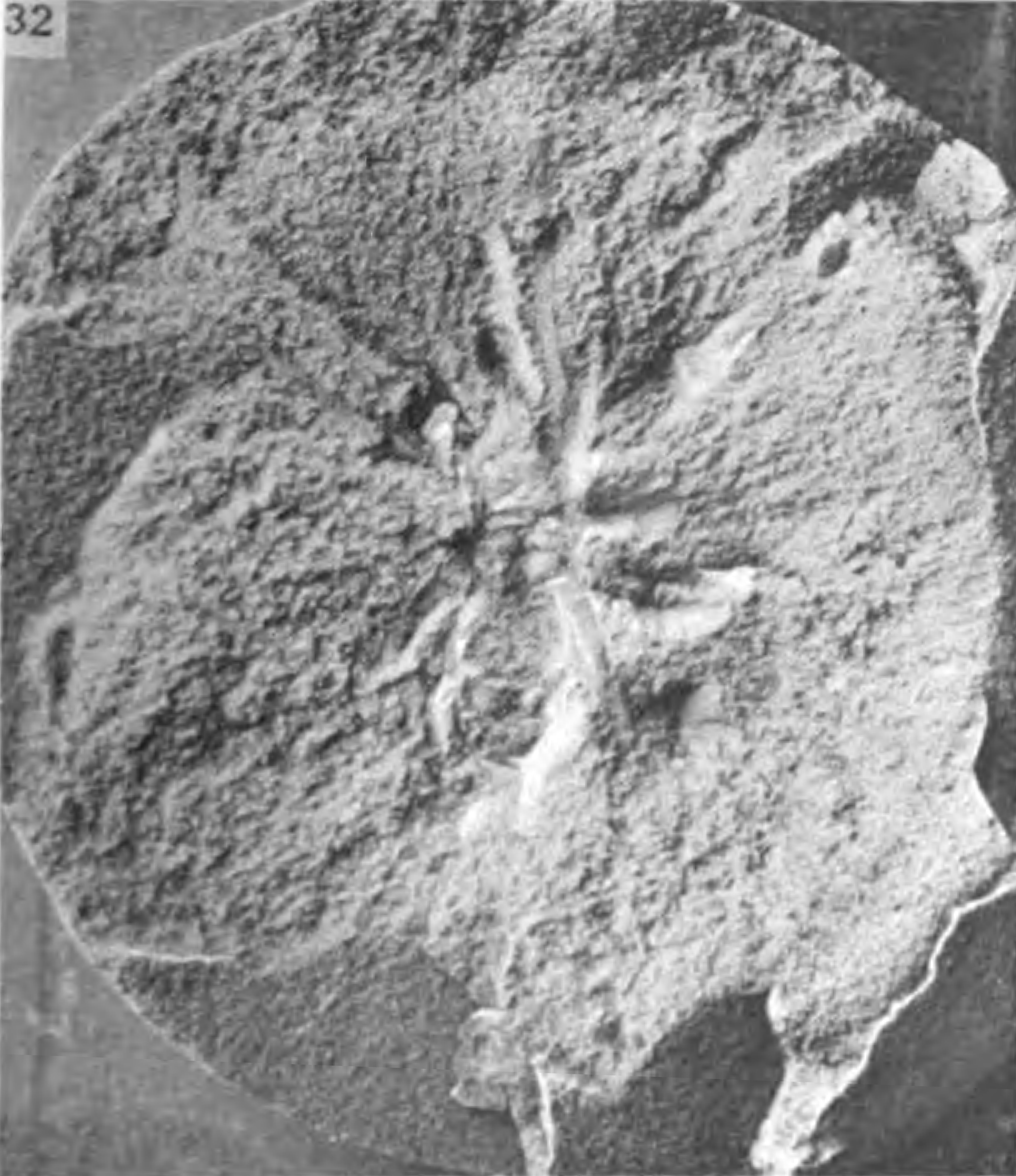
- Fossil of Protosolpuga

Scientific classification
- Domain: Eukaryota
- Kingdom: Animalia
- Phylum: Arthropoda
- Subphylum: Chelicerata
- Class: Arachnida
- Order: Solifugae
- Family: †Protosolpugidae
- Genus: †Protosolpuga; Petrunkevitch 1913
- Species: †P. carbonaria

Binomial name
- †Protosolpuga carbonaria Petrunkevitch 1913

= Protosolpuga =

Protosolpuga Temporal range: Late Carboniferous 311.45–306.95 Ma

Extinct species of spider-like organisms

Protosolpuga carbonaria is an extinct species of solifuges, the only one of the genus Protosolpuga and the family Protosolpugidae. This Carboniferous camel spider was discovered in the Mazon Creek fossil beds of Illinois.

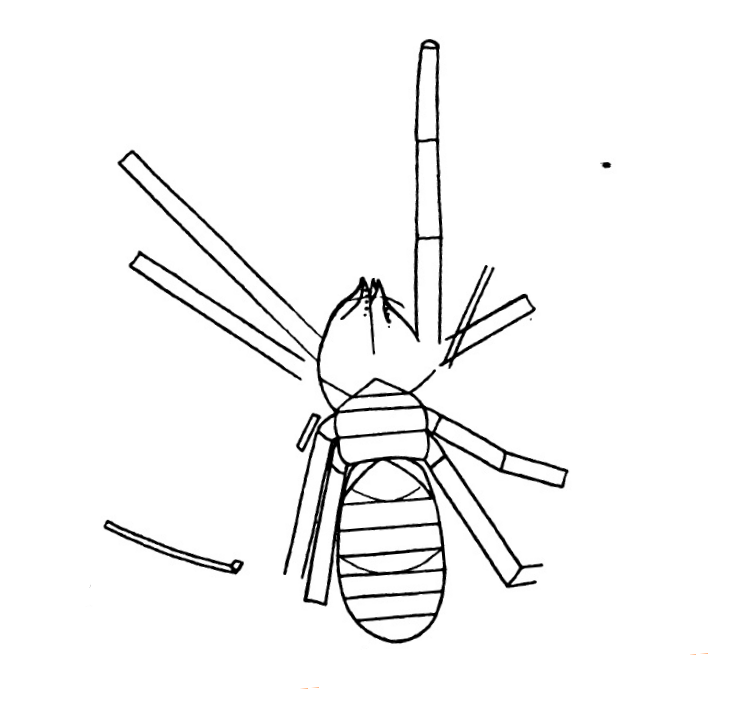
An illustration of Protosolpuga
