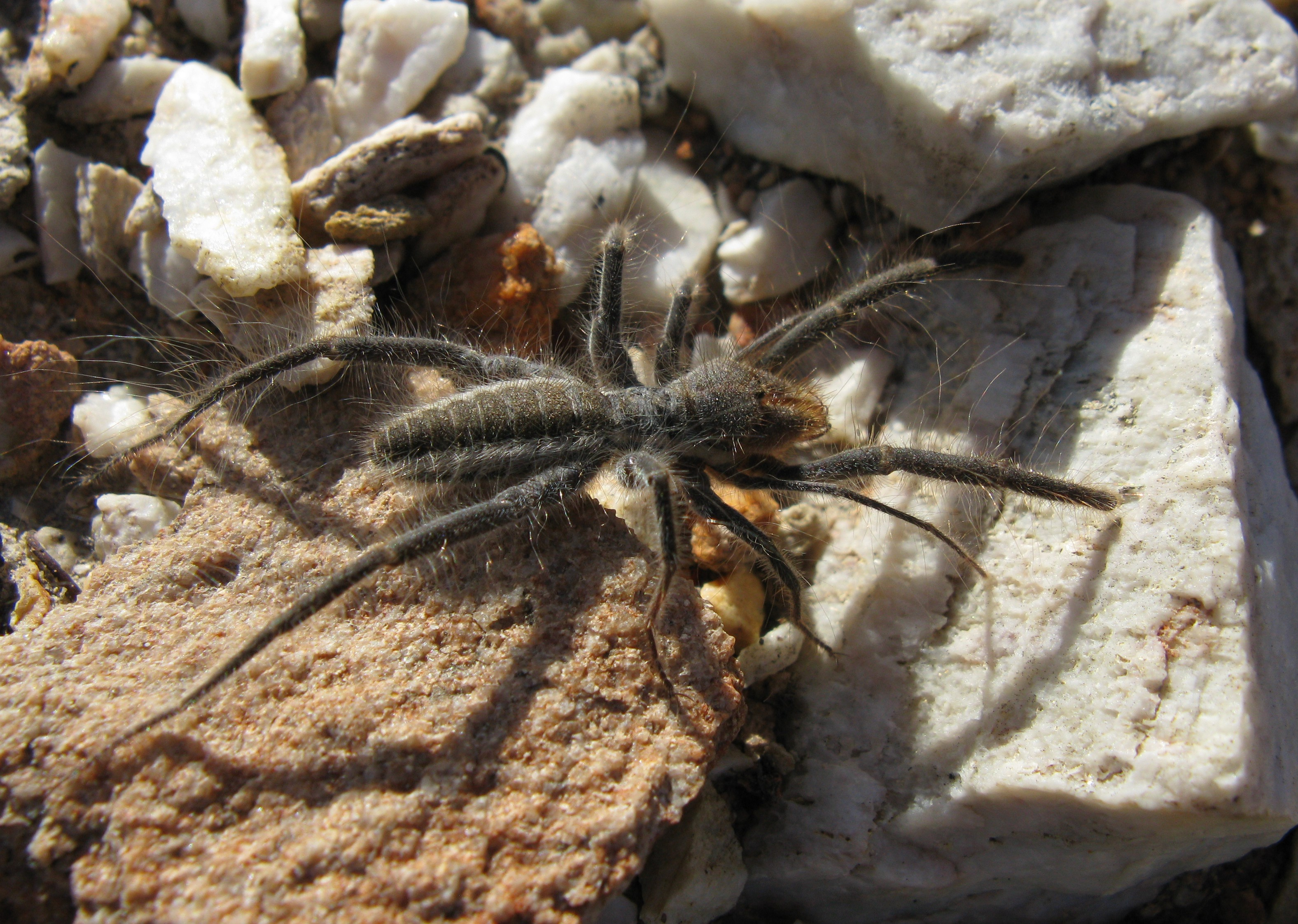

Scientific classification
- Kingdom: Animalia
- Phylum: Arthropoda
- Subphylum: Chelicerata
- Class: Arachnida
- Order: Solifugae
- Family: Solpugidae; Leach, 1815

= Solpugidae =

Family of spider-like animals

Solpugidae is a family of solifuges or sun spiders. Solpugidae have groups of papillae on their pedipalps or sensory organs. The papillae come out of sockets that are characterized with the function of mechanoreceptor, and contact chemoreceptors, which allows them to respond to stimuli such as touch and sound.

== Genera ==
As of January 2025, the World Solifugae Catalog accepts the following seventeen genera:

- Ferrandia Roewer, 1933
- Metasolpuga Roewer, 1934
- Oparba Roewer, 1934
- Oparbella Roewer, 1934
- Prosolpuga Roewer, 1934
- Solpuga Lichtenstein, 1796
- Solpugassa Roewer, 1933
- Solpugeira Roewer, 1933
- Solpugella Roewer, 1933
- Solpugema Roewer, 1933
- Solpugiba Roewer, 1934
- Solpugista Roewer, 1934
- Solpugisticella Turk, 1960
- Solpuguna Roewer, 1933
- Solpugyla Roewer, 1933
- Zeria Simon, 1879
- Zeriassa Pocock, 1895
