= Solifugae =

Solifugae Temporal range: Late Carboniferous–recent
- Solifuge from Colorado, U.S.

Scientific classification
- Kingdom: Animalia
- Phylum: Arthropoda
- Subphylum: Chelicerata
- Class: Arachnida
- Order: Solifugae; Sundevall, 1833

Families
- See text

Order of arachnids

Solifugae is an order of arachnids known variously as solifuges, sun spiders, camel spiders, wind scorpions and jerrymanders. The order includes more than 1,000 described species in about 147 genera. Despite their common names, they differ from both order Spiders and order Scorpiones. Most species of solifuges live in dry climates and feed opportunistically on ground-dwelling arthropods and other small animals. The largest species grow to a length of 12–15 cm (5–6 in), including legs. A number of urban legends exaggerate the size and speed of solifuges, and their potential danger to humans, which is negligible.

== Etymology ==
The order's name is derived from the Latin sol meaning "sun" and fugere meaning "to flee". Put together, it means "those that flee from the sun". These animals have a number of common names, including sun spiders, wind scorpions, wind spiders, red romans, and camel spiders. In Afrikaans, they are known as haarskeerders ("hair shavers"), and baardskeerders ("beard shavers"), in reference to myths that they cut hair to be used as nest bedding.

== Anatomy ==
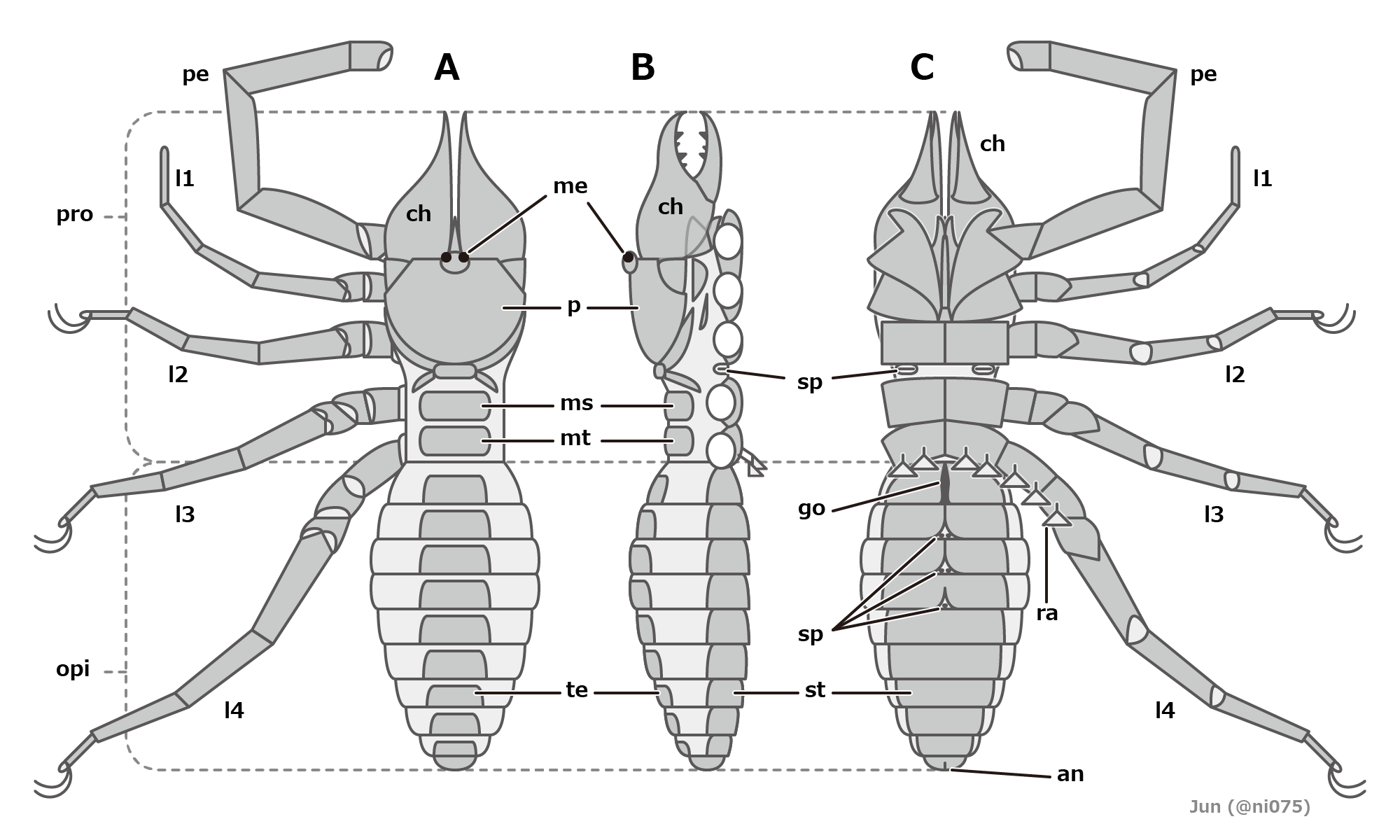
Generalized solifugid anatomy (Note: Legend: an: anal opening; CH: chelicerae; GO: gonopore; L1-4: walking legs; me: median eye; MS: mesopeltidium; MT: metapeltidium; OPI: opisthosoma; P: propeltidium; PE: pedipalps; PRO: prosoma; RA: malleoli; SP: spiracles; ST: sternites; TE: tergites)

Solifuges are moderately small to large arachnids (a few millimeters to several centimeters in body length), with the larger species reaching 12–15 cm (5–6 in) in length, including legs. In practice, the respective lengths of the legs of various species differ greatly, so the resulting figures are often misleading. More practical measurements refer primarily to the body length, quoting leg lengths separately, if at all. The body length is up to 7 cm (3 in). Most species are closer to 5 cm (2 in) long, and some small species are under 1 cm (0.4 in) in head-plus-body length when mature.

Like that of spiders, the body plan of the Solifugae has two main tagmata: The prosoma, or cephalothorax, is the anterior tagma, and the 10-segmented abdomen, or opisthosoma, is the posterior tagma. (Note: As of 2009, neither fossil nor embryological evidence shows that arachnids ever had a separate thorax-like division, so the validity of the term cephalothorax, which means a fused cephalon, or head, and thorax, has been questioned. Also, arguments exist against the use of "abdomen", as the opisthosoma of many arachnids contains organs atypical of an abdomen, such as a heart and respiratory organs.) The abdominal tergites and sternites are separated by large areas of intersegmental membranes, giving it a high degree of flexibility and ability to stretch considerably, which allows it to consume a large amount of food. As can be seen, the solifuge prosoma and opisthosoma are not separated by nearly as clear a constriction and connecting tube or "pedicel" as occurs in the Araneae (spiders). The lack of the pedicel reflects another difference between the Solifugae and spiders, namely that solifuges lack both spinnerets and silk, and as a consequence cannot spin webs. Spiders need considerable mobility of their abdomens in their spinning activities, and the Solifugae have no need for such an adaptation.

The prosoma comprises the head, the mouthparts, and the somites that bear the legs and the pedipalps. It is covered by a carapace, also called a prosomal dorsal shield or peltidium, which is composed of three distinct elements called propeltidium, mesopeltidium, and metapeltidium. The propeltidium contains the eyes, the chelicerae that in most species are conspicuously large, the pedipalps, and the first two pairs of legs. The meso- and metapeltidium contain the third and fourth pairs of legs. The chelicerae serve as jaws, and in many species also are used for stridulation. Unlike scorpions, solifuges do not have a third tagma that forms a "tail".

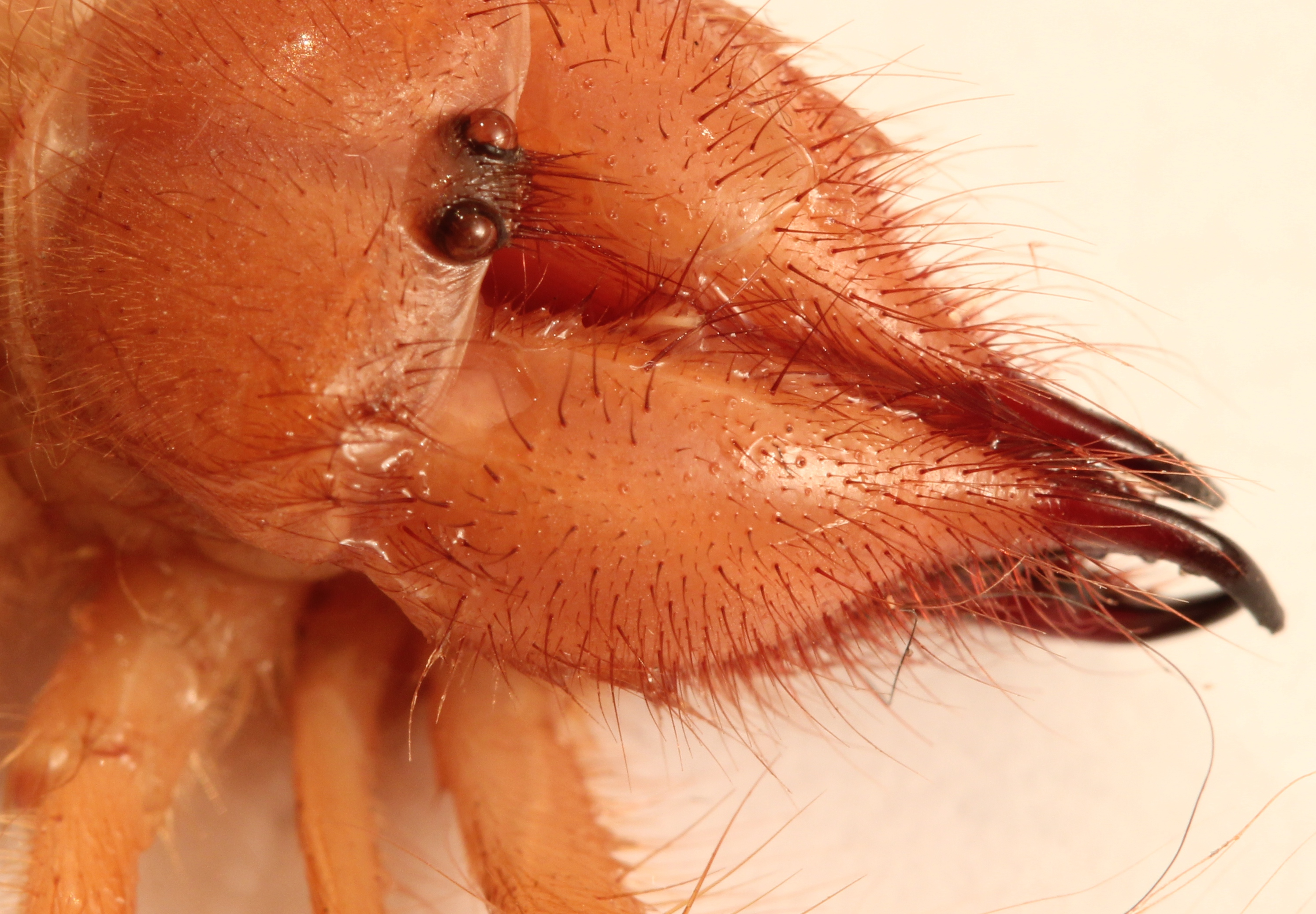
Solifuge eyes with bristly setae

Solifuges have a pair of large central eyes known as median ocelli. These eyes are oriented at the very front of its cephalothorax and are placed closely together. The eyes have a pigment-cup structure and are covered by a domed outer lens made from the animal's exoskeleton. Below the dome is the animal's retina, a multitiered structure with a layer of cells called the vitreous body at its top. Underneath is the thin preretinal membrane, acting as a barrier between the vitreous body above and the rhabdomeres beneath. Rhabdomeres are light-sensitive and function as the eye's photoreceptors. Interspersed between the rhabdomeres are pigment cells. The eye's optic nerve begins at its center and is connected to the axons of numerous rhabdomeres.

In addition to the median eyes, solifuges possess a pair of vestigial lateral ocelli. These eyes are found in pits on the animal's cephalic lobes near the chelicerae. These ocelli's lenses are usually atrophied. However, in some species both nerves and pigment cells are present. In species where lateral eyes are functional, they probably aid in detecting motion or changes in brightness.

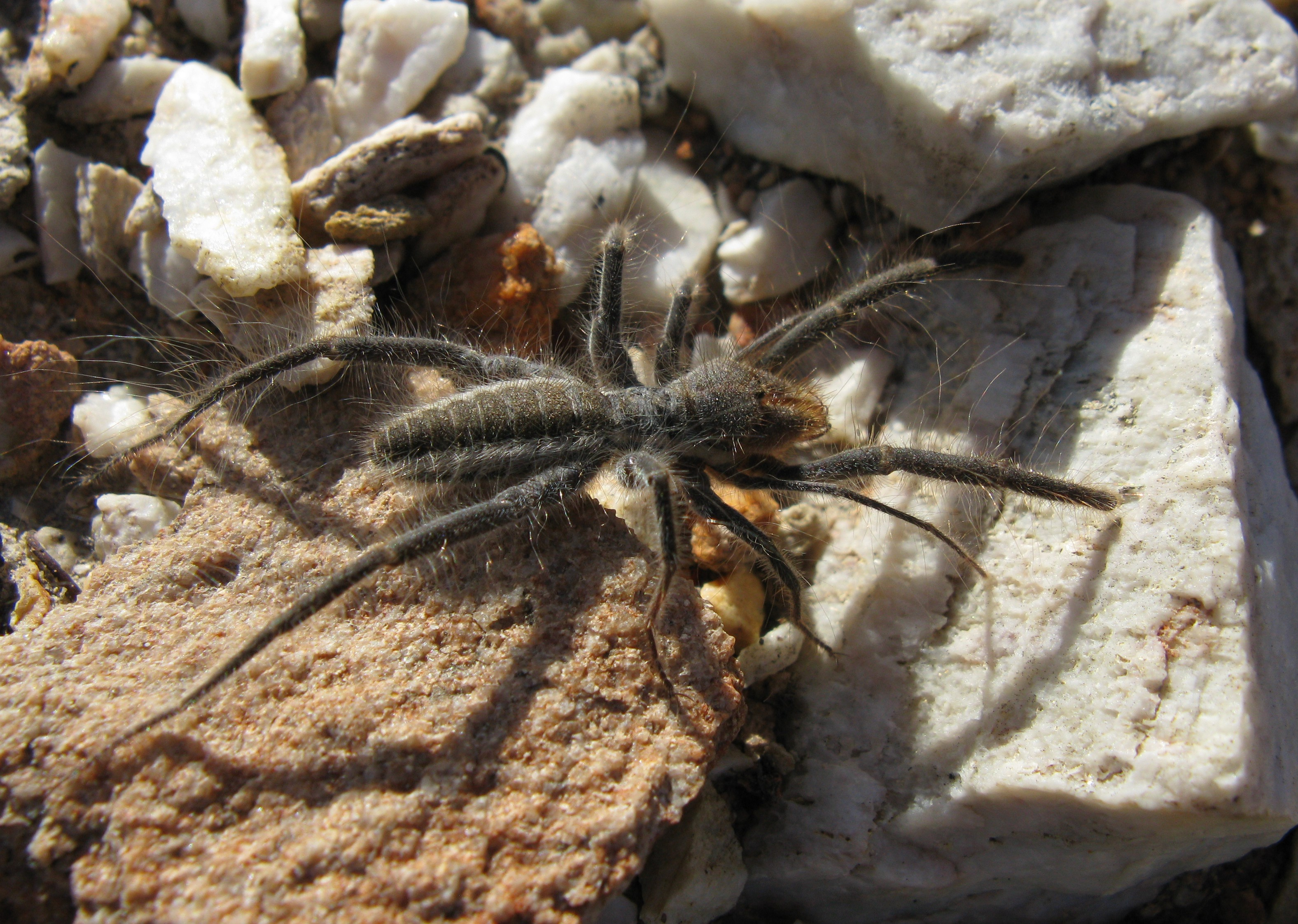
Male solifuge in South African veld: The flagella, appearing as large, backward-curling bristles, are visible near the tips of the chelicerae.

Like other arachnids outside the orders of scorpions and the Tetrapulmonata, the Solifugae lack book lungs, instead possessing a well-developed tracheal system that inhales and exhales air through a number of spiracles—one pair between the second and third pair of walking legs, two pairs on the abdomen on abdominal segments three and four, and an unpaired spiracle on the fifth abdominal segment. Air sacs are attached to the branching tracheae, with tracheoles penetrating the epithelia of internal organs. Hemocyanin, a respiratory pigment common in the hemolymph of many arachnids and other arthropods, is absent. As embryos they also have opisthosomal protuberances resembling the pulmonary sacs found in some palpigrades. They utilize discontinuous gas exchange almost identical to that of insects, where they go through periods where the spiracles are closed, followed by a phase with open spiracles to allow gas exchange.

Solifuges are somewhat sexually dimorphic, with the smaller males often possessing longer legs. Furthermore, the males bear a pair of flagella, one on each chelicerae, which are visible near the tip of each chelicerae. The flagella, which bend back over the chelicerae, are sometimes called horns and are believed to have some sexual connection, but their function has not yet been clearly explained.

=== Chelicerae ===
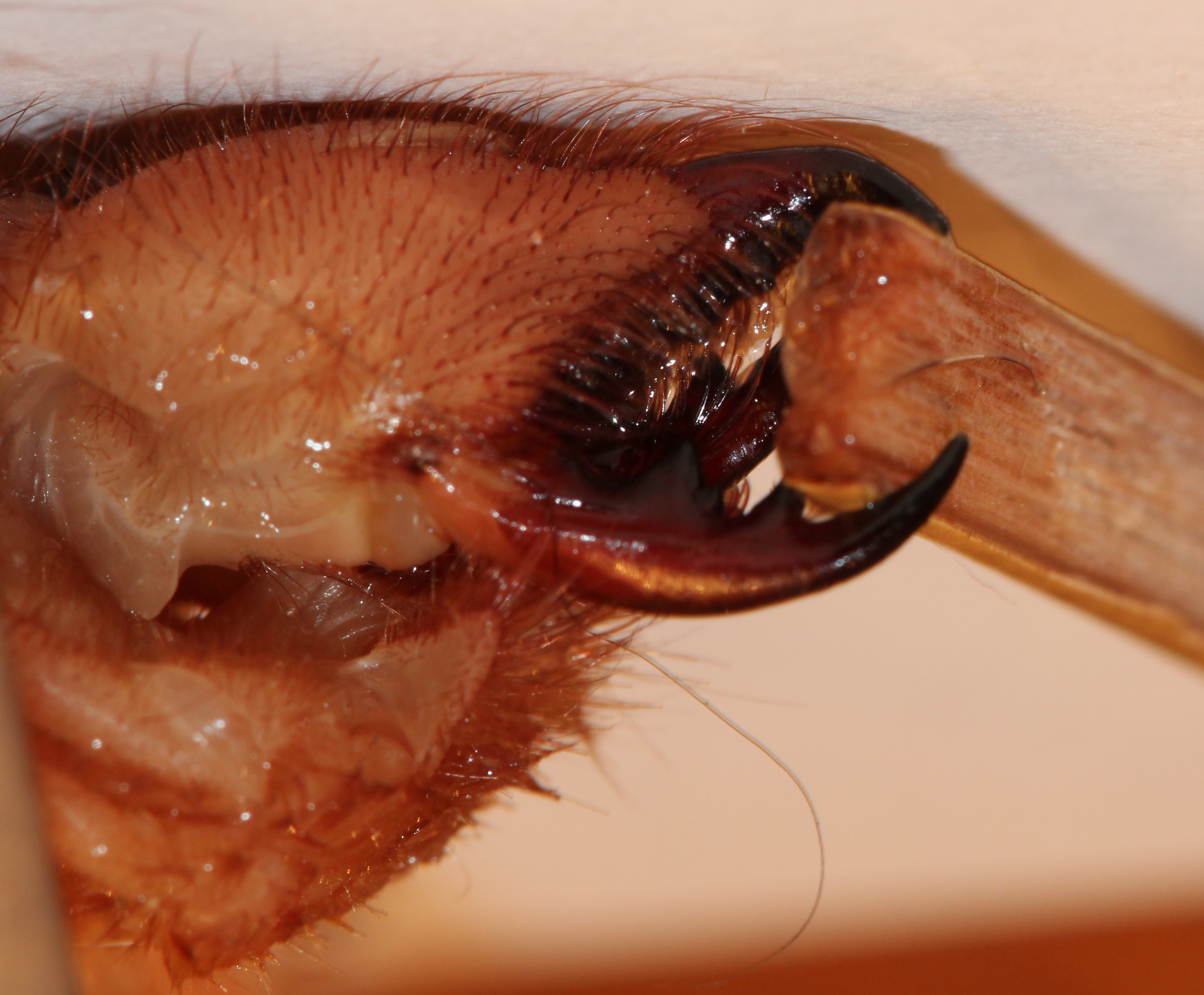
Details of solifuge chelicerae, in lateral view and in action

Among the most distinctive features of the Solifugae are their large chelicerae, which in many species are longer than the rest of the prosoma. Each of the two chelicerae has two articles (segments; parts connected by a joint), forming a powerful pincer, much like that of a crab; each article bears a variable number of teeth, largely depending on the species. The chelicerae of many species are surprisingly strong; they are capable of shearing hair or feathers from vertebrate prey or carrion, and of cutting through skin and thin bones such as those of small birds. Many Solifugae stridulate with their chelicerae, producing a rattling noise.

=== Other appendages ===
The legs and pedipalps of solifuges work the same way as in most other arachnids. Although the Solifugae appear to have five pairs of legs, only the four posterior (hindmost) pairs are considered true legs. Each true leg has seven segments: the coxa, trochanter, femur, patella, tibia, metatarsus, and tarsus.

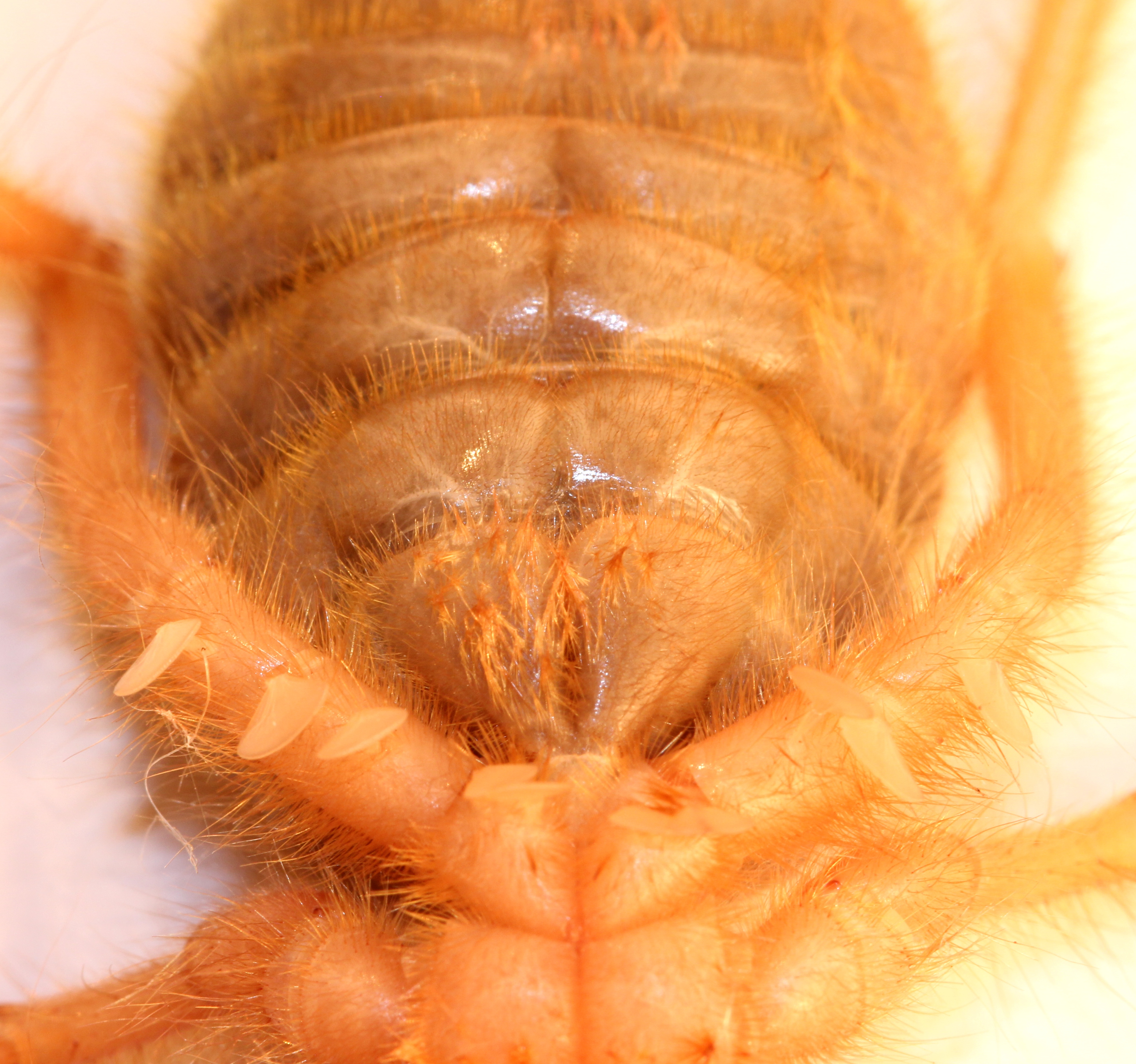
Ventral aspect of a solifuge, showing spiracles and malleoli

The first or anterior pair of the five pairs of leg-like appendages are not "actual" legs, but pedipalps, and they have only five segments each. The pedipalps of the Solifugae function partly as sense organs similar to insects' antennae, and partly in locomotion, feeding, and fighting. In normal locomotion, they do not quite touch the ground, but are held out to detect obstacles and prey; in that attitude, they look particularly like an extra pair of legs or perhaps arms. Reflecting the great dependence of the Solifugae on their tactile senses, their anterior true legs commonly are smaller and thinner than the posterior three pairs. That smaller anterior pair acts largely in a sensory role as a supplement to the pedipalps, and in many species they accordingly lack tarsi. At the tips of their pedipalps, Solifugae bear a membranous suctorial organ, which are used for capturing prey, and also for bringing water to their mouthparts for drinking and climbing smooth surfaces. For the most part, only the posterior three pairs of legs are used for running.

On the ventral portion (undersides) of the coxae and trochanters of the last pair of legs, the Solifugae possess fan-shaped structures called malleoli, also referred to as the racket organs (sing. malleolus). These paired organs are chemoreceptors, being the analogues of pectines in scorpions, and modified walking limbs in the uropygids and amblypygids as well as the pedipalps in spiders and other arachnids. Generally, solifuges have five pairs of malleoli on the ventral surface of the fourth pair of legs. Malleoli are usually larger in males. A malleolus comprises a basal stalk and a triangular fan, with epicuticular protrusions on each anterior face, and granular structures on each stalk, with undulated surfaces at each distal end. Sometimes, the blades of the malleoli are directed forward, sometimes not.

== Habitat and distribution ==
Most solifuges live in tropics and subtropical deserts in the Americas, Southern Europe, Africa, the Middle East, and South Asia. Surprisingly, these animals are absent in Australia and Madagascar. Within the desert, solifuges live in a variety of micro-habitats. These include sand dunes, sand flats, floodplains, rocky hillsides, desert shrublands, gravel plains, and mountain valleys. In addition to the desert, certain solifuges live in more arid grasslands and forests.

Depending on the species, solifuges may be more sedentary or active. Sedentary species are often fossorial, living in relatively permanent burrows underground. Active species spend most of their time on the surface, occasionally seeking refuge in cracks or under rocks and vegetation.

== Behavior and life history ==
=== Diet and hunting ===
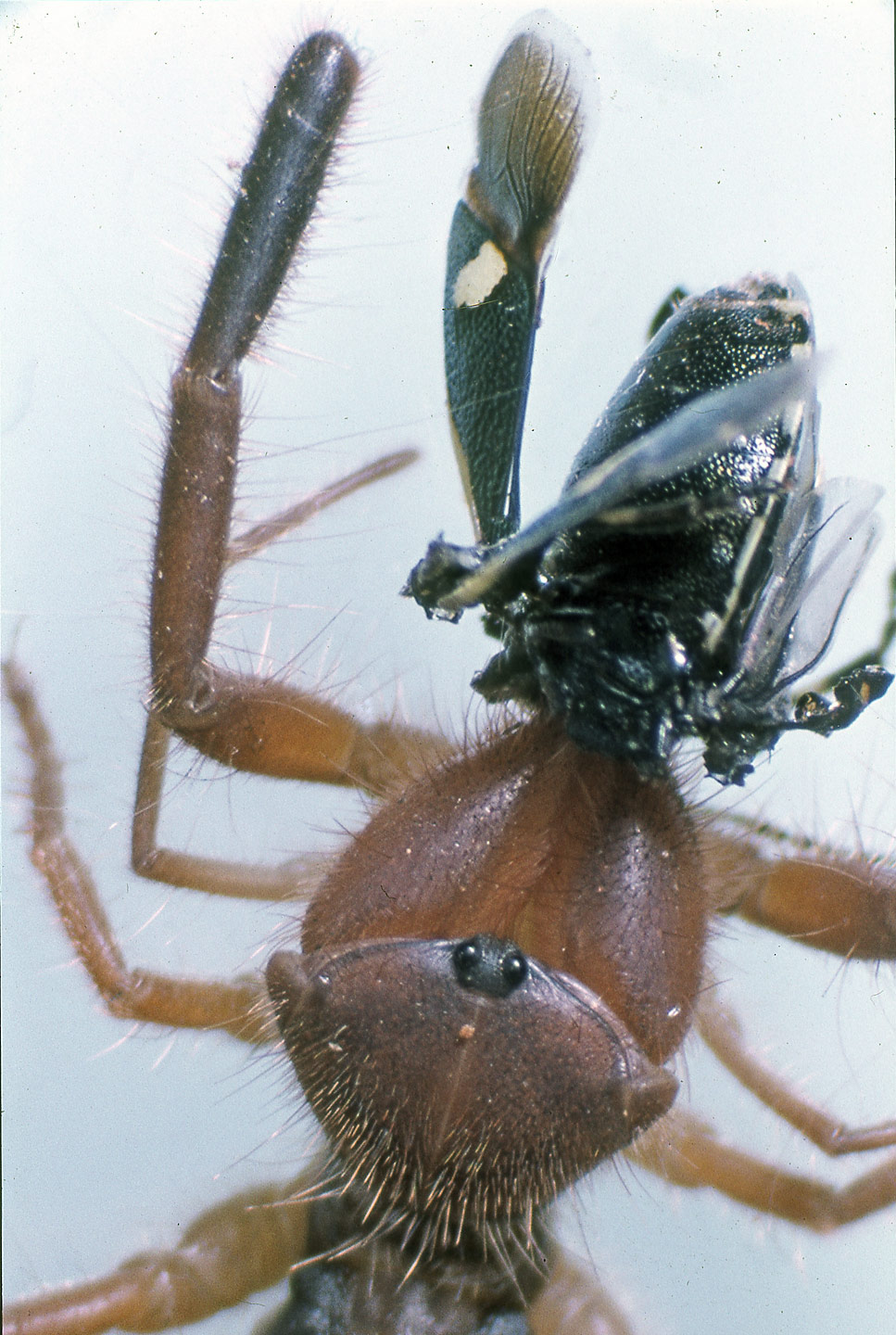
Gluvia dorsalis eating a cabbage bug (Eurydema oleracea)

Solifuges are carnivores and typically generalists, feeding on a wide variety of prey in their given environment. For most species, insects make up the bulk of their diet, but these animals have been known to consume any prey they can subdue. This includes other arachnids such as spiders, scorpions, and smaller solifuges, other arthropods such as millipedes, and small lizards, birds, and mammals. Additionally, solifuges are voracious eaters. Adult females commonly eat so much that they are temporarily unable to walk.

When hunting for prey, most solifuges rapidly move around while tapping their pedipalps on the ground. The only exception is the majority of termite-loving species, as they prefer to be more sedentary. In addition to using their pedipalps, solifuges have a variety of methods to locate prey, including seeing movements with their eyes, feeling with their long, hairlike setae, smelling with their malleoli, and sensing vibrations. How much the animal relies on each sense depends on the species. While all hunt on the ground, some species are great climbers, able to search for prey on trees, shrubs, and artificial structures.

Solifuges hunt their prey using three main hunting-strategies: Stalking, chasing, and ambushing. Depending on the meal's size, prey is seized with the animal's pedipalps or massive chelicerae. When the pedipalps are used, prey is initially caught with the limb's suction cups, then rapidly pulled toward the chelicerae to be chewed. These motions happen so fast that they cannot be distinguished. Before eating, they prepare their food by removing any parts they find unfavorable. In arthropods, these are typically areas that have a high amount of chitin (heads, antennae, wings, etc.).

A solifuge eats in different ways based on the shape of its food. Prey that is long and narrow is held perpendicular to the chelicerae and chewed from one end to another. Rounder prey is chewed by rotating the body all at once. This chewing motion turns the food into a liquidized paste, which is then swallowed by the animal's pharynx. A solifuge that has not fed for a long period is known to eat faster than one that has fed recently. Larger solifuges are also known to eat faster than smaller ones.

=== Reproduction ===
The Solifugae are typically univoltine (reproducing once a year). Spermatogenesis occurs prior to adulthood. When reaching the adult stage, the testicles have already degenerated, and adult males store a finite supply of sperm. In some, like the Galeodidae, the male deposits sperm on the substrate and transfers it into the female using his chelicerae, whereas other males show more direct transfer, such as Metasolpuga picta, which deposit sperm on the females' body dorsum, and the Eremobatidae, which place a spermatophore directly on the females' genitals through gonopore-to-gonopore contact, before pushing it into her body with his chelicerae. During mating with female inactivity, the male grasps and manipulates the female, turning her onto her back, and uses his chelicerae in chewing movements within the genital opening both before and after sperm transfer.

The female then digs a burrow, into which she lays 50 to 200 eggs; some species then guard them until they hatch. Because the female does not feed during this time, she tries to fatten herself beforehand, and a species of 5 cm (2.0 in) has been observed to eat more than 100 flies during that time in the laboratory. The Solifugae undergo a number of stages including, egg, postembryo, 9–10 nymphal instars, and adults.

=== Diapause ===
Solifuges undergo periods of diapause (variously referred to as dormancy, torpor, or hibernation) in times such as during "unseasonable conditions" unsuitable for them (such as high rainfall or cold temperatures). Solifuges exhibit several types of voltinism, with annual, biannual, and multiannual (semivoltine) life cycles having been observed. Despite multiple references to this behavior, dormancy, like many aspects of the Solifugae, remain understudied and requires further systematic studies.

== Classification and phylogeny ==
Solifuges are an order of arachnids comprising over 1200 species in at least 146 genera assigned to 16 different families. They can be divided into two groups of families, which are recognized as distinct suborders. These are the Australosolifugae, which live predominantly in the Southern Hemisphere and the Boreosolifugae, which live mostly in the Northern Hemisphere. This phylogeny is considered congruent with a Gondwanan origin for Australosolifugae and a Laurasian origin for Boreosolifugae. When looking at their relationships, the families Ammotrechidae and Daesiidae were found to be paraphyletic, leading to multiple clades without a name. Because of this, a later genomic study established three additional families: the Dinorhaxidae, Lipophagidae, and Namibesiidae.

Suborder Australosolifugae
- Ammotrechidae Roewer, 1934
- Ceromidae Roewer, 1933
- Daesiidae Kraepelin, 1899
- Dinorhaxidae (Roewer, 1933)
- Hexisopodidae Pocock, 1897
- Melanoblossiidae Roewer, 1933
- Mummuciidae Roewer, 1934
- Lipophagidae (Wharton, 1981)
- Namibesiidae (Wharton, 1981)
- Solpugidae Leach, 1815

Suborder Boreosolifugae

- Eremobatidae Kraepelin, 1901
- Galeodidae Sundevall, 1833
- Gylippidae Roewer, 1933
- Karschiidae Kraepelin, 1899
- Rhagodidae Pocock, 1897

incertae sedis

- †Protosolpugidae Petrunkevitch, 1953

=== Phylogeny ===
Below is a family tree of the various solifuge families based on phylogenomics.

- Solifugae
  - Boreosolifugae
    - - Gylippidae
      - Eremobatidae
    - - Karschiidae
      - - Galeodidae
        - Rhagodidae
  - Australosolifugae
    - Ceromidae
    - - - Hexisopodidae
        - Solpugidae
      - Others

== Relationship with humans ==
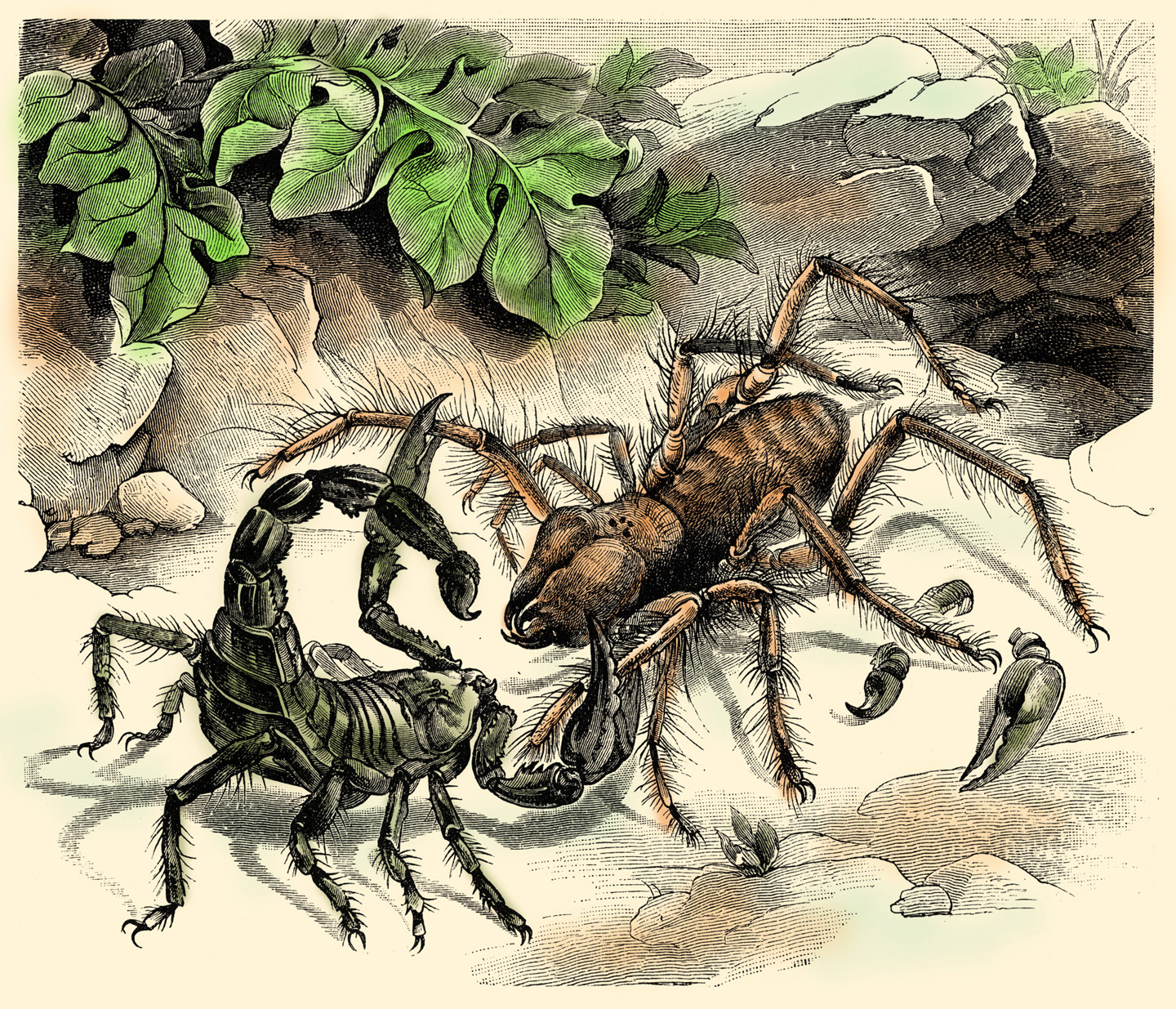
A scorpion (left) fighting a solifuge (right)

Solifuges have been recognized as distinct taxa from ancient times. In Aelian's De natura animalium, "four-jawed spiders" are credited, along with scorpions, as being responsible for the abandoning of a desert region near the Astaboras River (said to be in India, but thought to be a river in Ethiopia). Anton August Heinrich Lichtenstein theorized in 1797 that the "mice" that plagued the Philistines in the Old Testament were Solifugae. During World War I, troops stationed in Abū Qīr, Egypt, would stage fights between captive "jerrymanders", as they referred to them, and placed bets on the outcome. Similarly, British troops stationed in Libya in World War II staged fights between solifuges and scorpions.

=== Urban legends ===
The Solifugae are the subject of many legends and exaggerations about their size, speed, behavior, appetite, and lethality. They are not especially large, the biggest having a leg span around 12 cm (4.7 in). They are, however, indeed fast on land as compared to other invertebrates, with their top speed estimated at 16 km/h (10 mph).

The Solifugae apparently have neither venom glands nor any venom-delivery apparatus such as the fangs of spiders, stings of wasps, or venomous setae of caterpillars (e.g., Lonomia or Acharia species). One 1978 study is frequently quoted, in which the authors report detection of an exception in India, in that Rhagodes nigrocinctus had venom glands, and that injection of the secretion into mice was frequently fatal, but no supporting studies have confirmed either statement, such as by independent detection of the glands as claimed, or the relevance of the observations, if correct. Even the authors of the original account admitted to having found no means of delivery of the putative venom by the animal, and the only means of administering the material to the mice was by parenteral injection. Given that many nonvenoms such as saliva, blood, and glandular secretions can be lethal if injected, and that no venomous function was even speculated upon in this study, evidence for even one venomous species of solifuge is yet to be found.

Because of their unfamiliar, spider-like appearance and rapid movements, the Solifugae have startled or even frightened many people. This fear was sufficient to drive a family from their home in August 2008, when one was allegedly discovered in a soldier's house in Colchester, England, and caused the family to blame the solifuge for the death of their pet dog. An Arizona resident developed painful lesions due to a claimed solifuge-bite but could not produce a specimen for confirmation. Though they are not venomous, the powerful chelicerae of a large specimen may inflict a painful nip, but nothing medically significant.

Claims that the Solifugae aggressively chase people are also untrue, as they are merely trying to stay in the shade/shadow provided by the human.
