= Xerophaeus longispinus =

Scientific classification
- Kingdom: Animalia
- Phylum: Arthropoda
- Subphylum: Chelicerata
- Class: Arachnida
- Order: Araneae
- Infraorder: Araneomorphae
- Family: Gnaphosidae
- Genus: Xerophaeus
- Species: X. longispinus

Binomial name
- Xerophaeus longispinus Purcell, 1908

Species of spider

Xerophaeus longispinus is a species of spider in the family Gnaphosidae. It is endemic to South Africa and is commonly known as the Kamaggas mouse ground spider.

== Distribution ==
Xerophaeus longispinus is recorded from two South African provinces: KwaZulu-Natal and the Northern Cape.

== Habitat and ecology ==
The species inhabits altitudes ranging from 231 to 2,892 m above sea level. Xerophaeus longispinus are free-living ground dwellers.

== Description ==
Xerophaeus longispinus is known from both sexes. The colour is pale yellowish-testaceous, with the head and chelicerae generally coppery-red, and the opisthosoma fulvous.

== Conservation ==
Xerophaeus longispinus is listed as Data Deficient. Three of the localities were sampled prior to 1908. The species is protected in Namaqua National Park and Goegap Nature Reserve, but more sampling is needed to determine the species' present range.

== Taxonomy ==
The species was originally described by W. F. Purcell in 1908 from Kamaggas. The species has not been revised but is known from both sexes.
