= Xerophaeus lightfooti =

Pale Leg Mouse Ground Spider

Conservation status
- Least Concern (SANBI Red List)

Scientific classification
- Kingdom: Animalia
- Phylum: Arthropoda
- Subphylum: Chelicerata
- Class: Arachnida
- Order: Araneae
- Infraorder: Araneomorphae
- Family: Gnaphosidae
- Genus: Xerophaeus
- Species: X. lightfooti

Binomial name
- Xerophaeus lightfooti Purcell, 1907

Species of spider

Xerophaeus lightfooti is a species of spider in the family Gnaphosidae. It is endemic to South Africa and is commonly known as the pale leg mouse ground spider.

== Distribution ==
Xerophaeus lightfooti is recorded from two South African provinces: the Northern Cape and Western Cape.

== Habitat and ecology ==
The species inhabits multiple biomes including Fynbos, Grassland, and Savanna biomes at altitudes ranging from 47 to 1172 m above sea level. Xerophaeus lightfooti are free-living ground dwellers.

== Conservation ==
Xerophaeus lightfooti is listed as Least Concern by the South African National Biodiversity Institute due to its wide range. The species is protected in Benfontein Nature Reserve and there are no known threats.

== Taxonomy ==
The species was originally described by W. F. Purcell in 1907 from Worcester. The species has not been revised but is known from both sexes.
