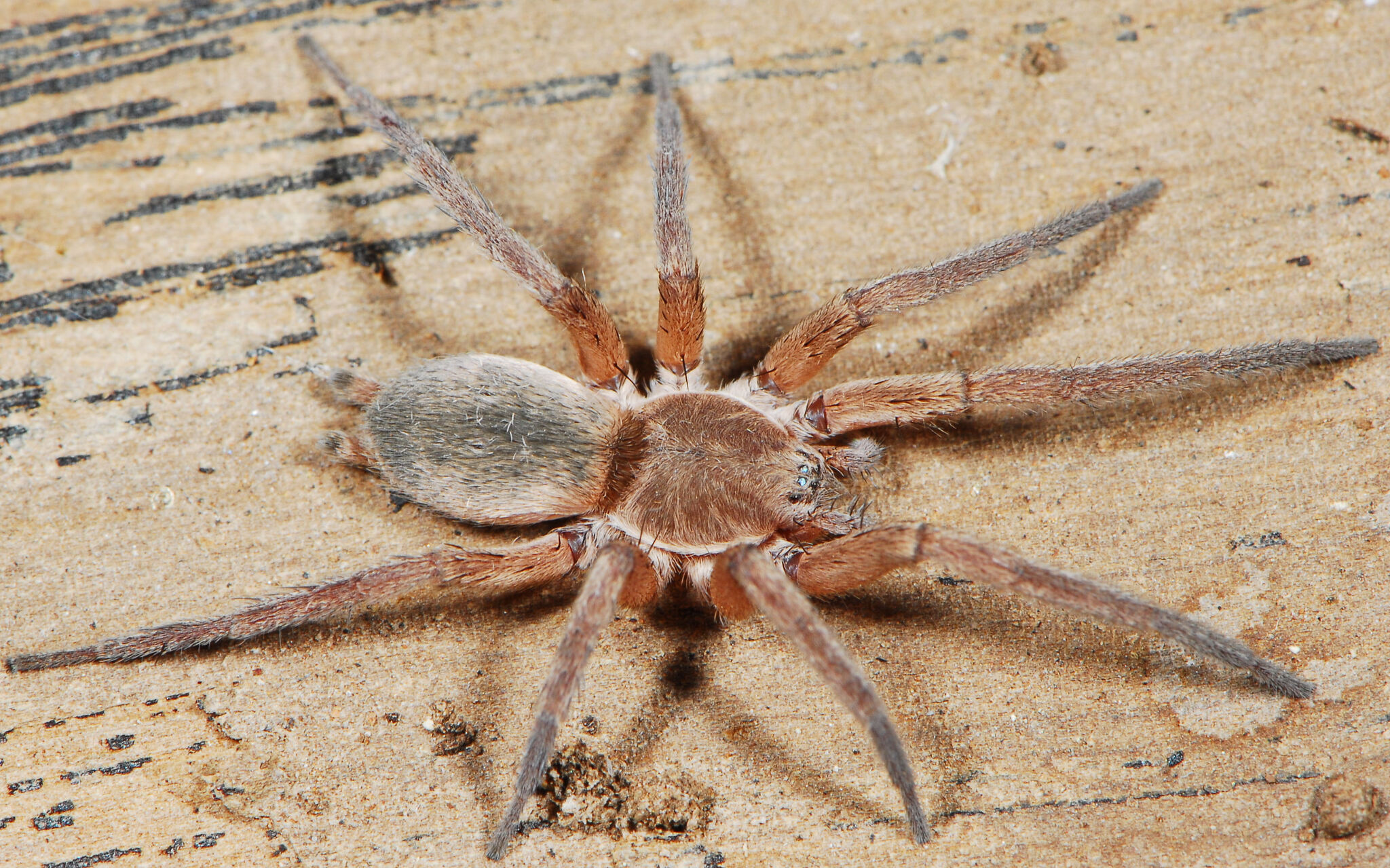
- female
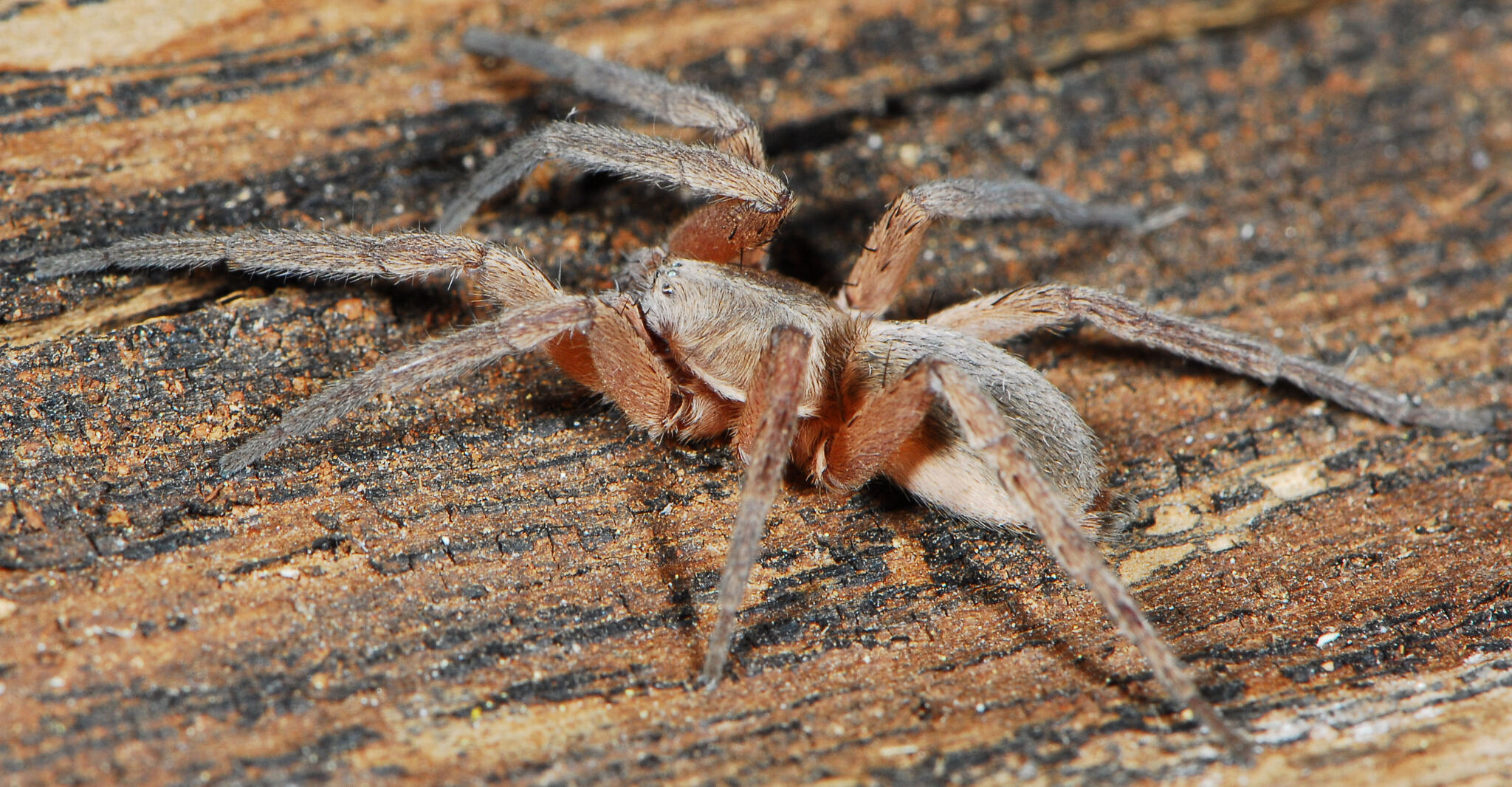
- female

Scientific classification
- Kingdom: Animalia
- Phylum: Arthropoda
- Subphylum: Chelicerata
- Class: Arachnida
- Order: Araneae
- Infraorder: Araneomorphae
- Family: Gnaphosidae
- Genus: Xerophaeus
- Species: X. appendiculatus

Binomial name
- Xerophaeus appendiculatus Purcell, 1907

= Xerophaeus appendiculatus =

Common Mouse Ground Spider

Species of spider

Xerophaeus appendiculatus is a species of spider in the family Gnaphosidae. It is endemic to South Africa and is commonly known as the common mouse ground spider.

== Distribution ==
Xerophaeus appendiculatus is recorded from seven South African provinces, Eastern Cape, Free State, Gauteng, KwaZulu-Natal, Limpopo, Northern Cape, and Western Cape.

== Habitat and ecology ==
The species inhabits multiple biomes including Grassland, Nama Karoo, and Savanna biomes at altitudes ranging from 54 to 1998 m above sea level. Xerophaeus appendiculatus are free-living ground dwellers.

== Description ==
Xerophaeus appendiculatus is known from both sexes. The colour of the carapace is light testaceous yellow, with the legs slightly paler. The chelicerae are blackish red and the opisthosoma is clothed with brown hairs. The total size is 12 mm for females and 9 mm for males.

== Conservation ==
Xerophaeus appendiculatus is listed as Least Concern by the South African National Biodiversity Institute. The species is protected in nine protected areas and there are no significant threats.

== Taxonomy ==
The species was originally described by W. F. Purcell in 1907 from Hanover in the Northern Cape. The species has not been revised but is known from both sexes.
