= Xerophaeus flavescens =

Scientific classification
- Kingdom: Animalia
- Phylum: Arthropoda
- Subphylum: Chelicerata
- Class: Arachnida
- Order: Araneae
- Infraorder: Araneomorphae
- Family: Gnaphosidae
- Genus: Xerophaeus
- Species: X. flavescens

Binomial name
- Xerophaeus flavescens Purcell, 1907

Species of spider

Xerophaeus flavescens is a species of spider in the family Gnaphosidae. It is endemic to South Africa.

== Distribution ==
Xerophaeus flavescens is endemic to the Western Cape and is known only from the type locality Clanwilliam.

== Habitat and ecology ==
The species inhabits the Fynbos biome at an altitude of 136 m above sea level. Xerophaeus flavescens are free-living ground dwellers.

== Description ==
Xerophaeus flavescens is known only from males. The colour is pale yellow, with the chelicerae and anterior part of the carapace reddish yellow. The opisthosoma is pallid, with dark hairs and yellow scutellum.

== Conservation ==
Xerophaeus flavescens is listed as Data Deficient for taxonomic reasons. The material is very old and too little is known about the location, habitat and threats of this taxon for an assessment to be made. More sampling is needed to collect females and determine the species' range.

== Taxonomy ==
The species was originally described by W. F. Purcell in 1907 from Clanwilliam. The species has not been revised and is known only from the male.
