= Lipophaga =

Scientific classification
- Domain: Eukaryota
- Kingdom: Animalia
- Phylum: Arthropoda
- Subphylum: Chelicerata
- Class: Arachnida
- Order: Solifugae
- Family: Gylippidae
- Genus: Lipophaga; Purcell, 1903

Type species
- Lipophaga trispinosa Purcell, 1903

Species
- 3, see text

Genus of camel spiders

Lipophaga is a genus of gylippid camel spiders, first described by William Frederick Purcell in 1903.

== Species ==
As of March 2023, the World Solifugae Catalog accepts the following three species:

- Lipophaga kraepelini Roewer, 1933 — Namibia
- Lipophaga schultzei (Kraepelin, 1908) — South Africa
- Lipophaga trispinosa Purcell, 1903 — South Africa
