= Xerophaeus lunulifer =

Umhlali Mouse Ground Spider

Conservation status
- Least Concern (SANBI Red List)

Scientific classification
- Kingdom: Animalia
- Phylum: Arthropoda
- Subphylum: Chelicerata
- Class: Arachnida
- Order: Araneae
- Infraorder: Araneomorphae
- Family: Gnaphosidae
- Genus: Xerophaeus
- Species: X. lunulifer

Binomial name
- Xerophaeus lunulifer Purcell, 1907

Species of spider

Xerophaeus lunulifer is a species of spider in the family Gnaphosidae. It is endemic to South Africa and is commonly known as the Umhlali mouse ground spider.

== Distribution ==
Xerophaeus lunulifer is recorded from four South African provinces: the Eastern Cape, KwaZulu-Natal, Limpopo, and Western Cape.

== Habitat and ecology ==
The species inhabits multiple biomes including Fynbos, Savanna, and Thicket biomes at altitudes ranging from 9 to 1534 m above sea level. Xerophaeus lunulifer are free-living ground dwellers.

== Conservation ==
Xerophaeus lunulifer is listed as Least Concern by the South African National Biodiversity Institute due to its wide range. The species is protected in False Bay Nature Reserve, Table Mountain National Park, and Hluhluwe Nature Reserve. There are no significant threats.

== Taxonomy ==
The species was originally described by W. F. Purcell in 1907 from Umhlali, KwaZulu-Natal. The species has not been revised but is known from both sexes.
