= Xerophaeus rostratus =

Graaff Reinet Mouse Ground Spider

Conservation status
- Least Concern (SANBI Red List)

Scientific classification
- Kingdom: Animalia
- Phylum: Arthropoda
- Subphylum: Chelicerata
- Class: Arachnida
- Order: Araneae
- Infraorder: Araneomorphae
- Family: Gnaphosidae
- Genus: Xerophaeus
- Species: X. rostratus

Binomial name
- Xerophaeus rostratus Purcell, 1907

Species of spider

Xerophaeus rostratus is a species of spider in the family Gnaphosidae. It is endemic to South Africa and is commonly known as the Graaff Reinet mouse ground spider.

== Distribution ==
Xerophaeus rostratus is recorded from three South African provinces: the Free State, Eastern Cape, and Gauteng.

== Habitat and ecology ==
The species inhabits the Grassland and Nama Karoo biomes at altitudes ranging from 778 to 1492 m above sea level. Xerophaeus rostratus are free-living ground dwellers.

== Conservation ==
Xerophaeus rostratus is listed as Least Concern by the South African National Biodiversity Institute. The species appears to be sufficiently widespread despite being known only from a few specimens. More sampling is needed to determine the species' range, but there are no significant threats.

== Taxonomy ==
The species was originally described by W. F. Purcell in 1907 from Graaff-Reinet. The species has not been revised but is known from both sexes.
