= Xerophaeus communis =

Willowmore Mouse Ground Spider

Conservation status
- Least Concern (SANBI Red List)

Scientific classification
- Kingdom: Animalia
- Phylum: Arthropoda
- Subphylum: Chelicerata
- Class: Arachnida
- Order: Araneae
- Infraorder: Araneomorphae
- Family: Gnaphosidae
- Genus: Xerophaeus
- Species: X. communis

Binomial name
- Xerophaeus communis Purcell, 1907

Species of spider

Xerophaeus communis is a species of spider in the family Gnaphosidae. It is endemic to South Africa and is commonly known as the Willowmore mouse ground spider.

== Distribution ==
Xerophaeus communis is recorded from four South African provinces: the Eastern Cape, KwaZulu-Natal, Northern Cape, and Western Cape.

== Habitat and ecology ==
The species inhabits multiple biomes including Nama Karoo, Thicket, and Fynbos biomes at altitudes ranging from 62 to 1820 m above sea level. Xerophaeus communis are free-living ground dwellers.

== Conservation ==
Xerophaeus communis is listed as Least Concern by the South African National Biodiversity Institute due to its wide geographic range. The species is protected in six protected areas and there are no known threats.

== Taxonomy ==
The species was originally described by W. F. Purcell in 1907 from Willowmore. The species has not been revised but is known from both sexes.
