= Xerophaeus spoliator =

Hanover Mouse Ground Spider

Scientific classification
- Kingdom: Animalia
- Phylum: Arthropoda
- Subphylum: Chelicerata
- Class: Arachnida
- Order: Araneae
- Infraorder: Araneomorphae
- Family: Gnaphosidae
- Genus: Xerophaeus
- Species: X. spoliator

Binomial name
- Xerophaeus spoliator Purcell, 1907

Species of spider

Xerophaeus spoliator is a species of spider in the family Gnaphosidae. It occurs in southern Africa and is commonly known as the Hanover mouse ground spider.

== Distribution ==
Xerophaeus spoliator is recorded from Namibia and South Africa. In South Africa, it is known from five provinces: the Free State, Limpopo, Northern Cape, North West, and Western Cape.

== Habitat and ecology ==
The species inhabits multiple biomes including Grassland, Nama Karoo, and Savanna biomes at altitudes ranging from 635 to 1358 m above sea level. Xerophaeus spoliator are free-living ground dwellers.

== Conservation ==
Xerophaeus spoliator is listed as Least Concern by the South African National Biodiversity Institute due to its wide geographic range. The species is protected in Augrabies National Park and there are no significant threats.

== Taxonomy ==
The species was originally described by W. F. Purcell in 1907 from Hanover in the Northern Cape. The species has not been revised but is known from both sexes.
