= Xerophaeus hottentottus =

Kalahari Mouse Ground Spider

Conservation status
- Least Concern (SANBI Red List)

Scientific classification
- Kingdom: Animalia
- Phylum: Arthropoda
- Subphylum: Chelicerata
- Class: Arachnida
- Order: Araneae
- Infraorder: Araneomorphae
- Family: Gnaphosidae
- Genus: Xerophaeus
- Species: X. hottentottus

Binomial name
- Xerophaeus hottentottus Purcell, 1908

Synonyms
- Xerophaeus gordonicus Hewitt, 1915

Species of spider

Xerophaeus hottentottus is a species of spider in the family Gnaphosidae. It is endemic to South Africa and is commonly known as the Kalahari mouse ground spider.

== Distribution ==
Xerophaeus hottentottus is recorded from three South African provinces, the Eastern Cape, Northern Cape, and North West.

== Habitat and ecology ==
The species inhabits multiple biomes including Succulent Karoo, Nama Karoo, and Grassland biomes at altitudes ranging from 63 to 1378 m above sea level. Xerophaeus hottentottus are free-living ground dwellers.

== Conservation ==
Xerophaeus hottentottus is listed as Least Concern by the South African National Biodiversity Institute due to its wide range. The species is protected in Fort Fordyce Forest Reserve and Augrabies National Park. There are no significant threats.

== Taxonomy ==
The species was originally described by W. F. Purcell in 1908 from Steinkopf in the Northern Cape. Tucker (1923) synonymized Xerophaeus gordonicus Hewitt, 1915 with this species. The species has not been revised and is known only from the female.
