= Xerophaeus capensis =

Cape Mouse Ground Spider

Conservation status
- Least Concern (SANBI Red List)

Scientific classification
- Kingdom: Animalia
- Phylum: Arthropoda
- Subphylum: Chelicerata
- Class: Arachnida
- Order: Araneae
- Infraorder: Araneomorphae
- Family: Gnaphosidae
- Genus: Xerophaeus
- Species: X. capensis

Binomial name
- Xerophaeus capensis Purcell, 1907

Synonyms
- Xerophaeus delphinurus Purcell, 1907; Xerophaeus interrogator Purcell, 1907

Species of spider

Xerophaeus capensis is a species of spider in the family Gnaphosidae. It is endemic to South Africa and is commonly known as the Cape mouse ground spider. This species is the type species of the genus Xerophaeus.

== Distribution ==
Xerophaeus capensis is recorded from two South African provinces: the Northern Cape and Western Cape.

== Habitat and ecology ==
The species inhabits the Fynbos and Succulent Karoo biomes at altitudes ranging from 5 to 1358 m above sea level. Xerophaeus capensis are free-living ground dwellers and have been sampled from vineyards as well as natural habitats.

== Conservation ==
Xerophaeus capensis is listed as Least Concern by the South African National Biodiversity Institute. The species is protected in Namaqua National Park, De Hoop Nature Reserve, and Table Mountain National Park. There are no significant threats.

== Taxonomy ==
The species was originally described by W. F. Purcell in 1907 from Devils Peak in Cape Town. Tucker (1923) synonymized Xerophaeus delphinurus and X. interrogator, both described by Purcell in 1907, with this species. The species has not been revised but is known from both sexes.
