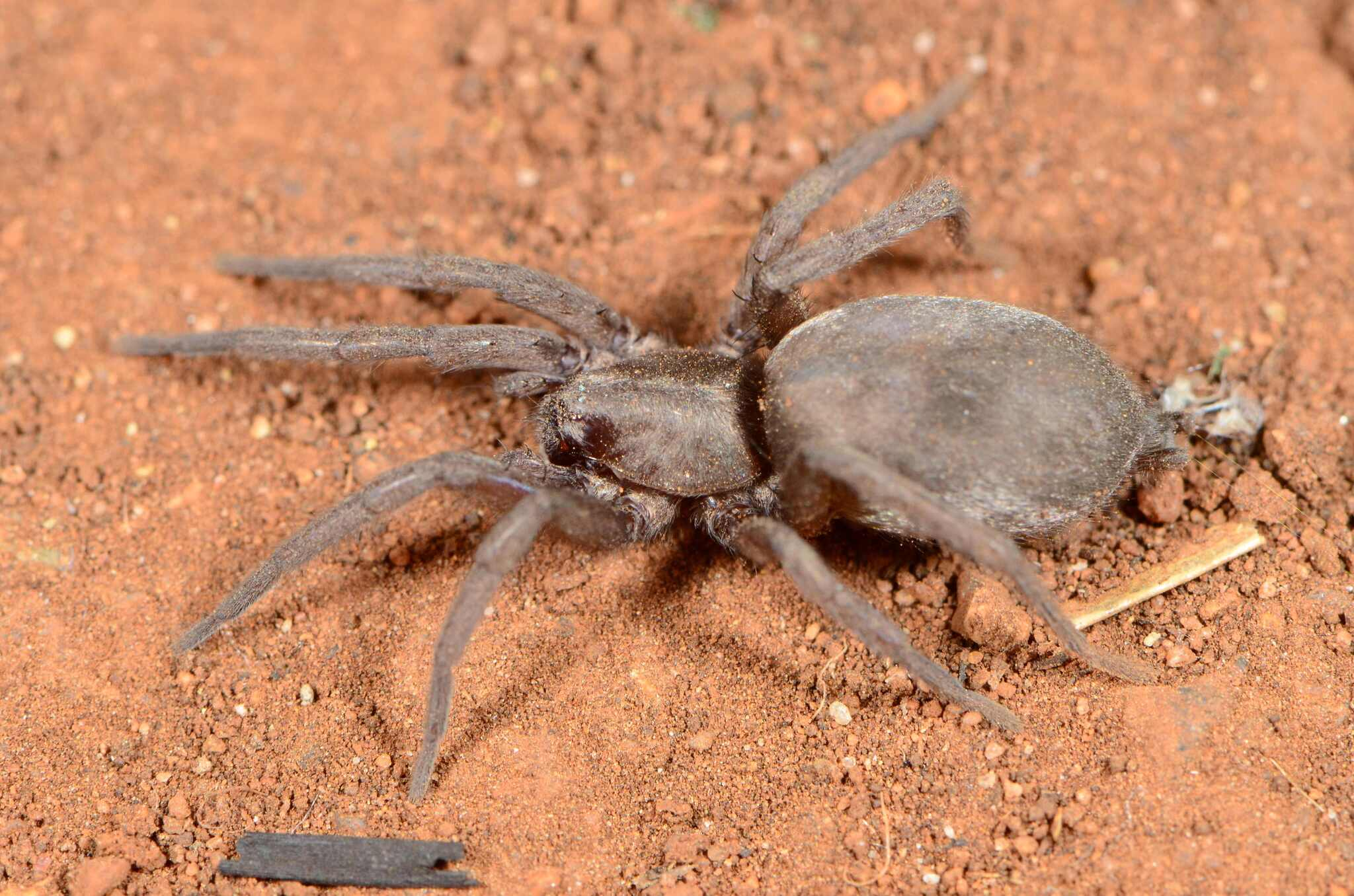
- female
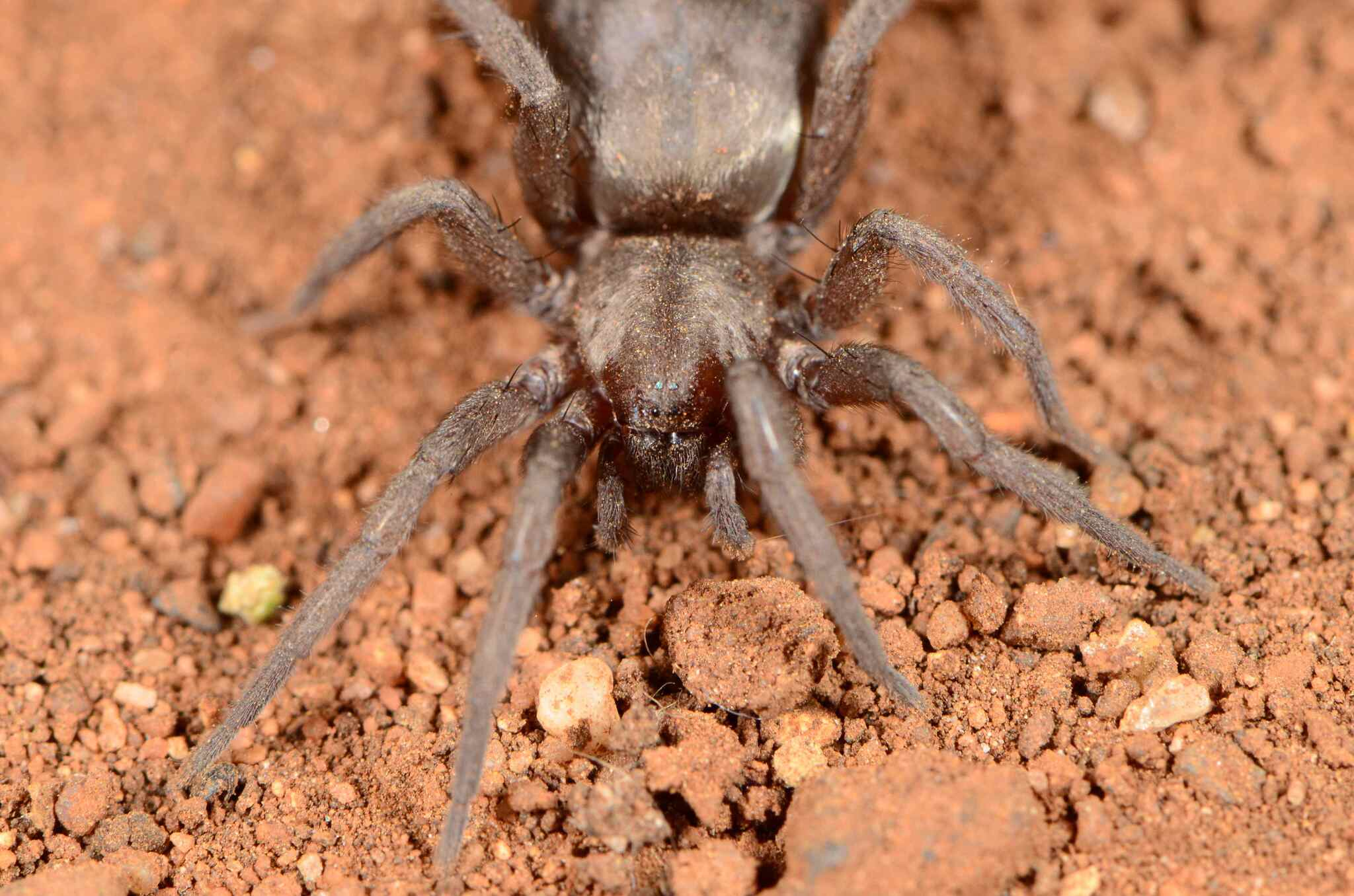
- female

Scientific classification
- Kingdom: Animalia
- Phylum: Arthropoda
- Subphylum: Chelicerata
- Class: Arachnida
- Order: Araneae
- Infraorder: Araneomorphae
- Family: Gnaphosidae
- Genus: Xerophaeus
- Species: X. aridus

Binomial name
- Xerophaeus aridus Purcell, 1907

Synonyms
- Xerophaeus poweri Hewitt, 1915

= Xerophaeus aridus =

Arid Mouse Ground Spider

Species of spider

Xerophaeus aridus is a species of spider in the family Gnaphosidae. It occurs in southern Africa and is commonly known as the arid mouse ground spider.

== Distribution ==
Xerophaeus aridus is recorded from Namibia and South Africa. In South Africa, it is known from the Free State and Northern Cape.

== Habitat and ecology ==
The species inhabits the Nama Karoo and Grassland biomes at altitudes ranging from 1011 to 1357 m above sea level. Xerophaeus aridus are free-living ground dwellers.

== Description ==
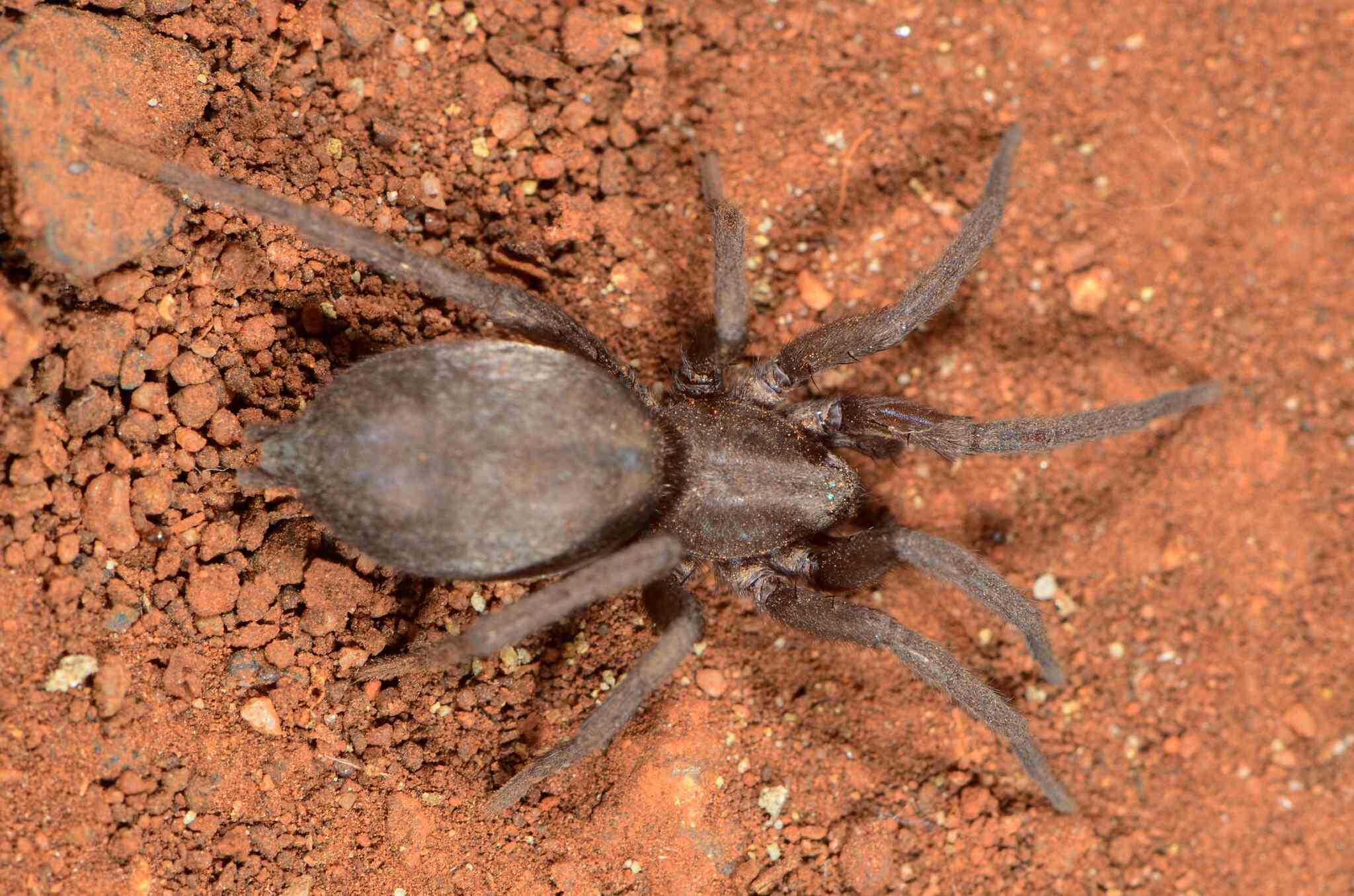
female

== Conservation ==
Xerophaeus aridus is listed as Least Concern by the South African National Biodiversity Institute due to its wide range. The species is protected in six protected areas including Erfenis Dam Nature Reserve, Kalkfontein Dam Nature Reserve, Benfontein Game Reserve, Namaqua National Park, and Rooipoort Nature Reserve. There are no known threats.

== Taxonomy ==
The species was originally described by W. F. Purcell in 1907 from Namibia. Tucker (1923) synonymized Xerophaeus poweri Hewitt, 1915 with this species. The species has not been revised but is known from both sexes.
