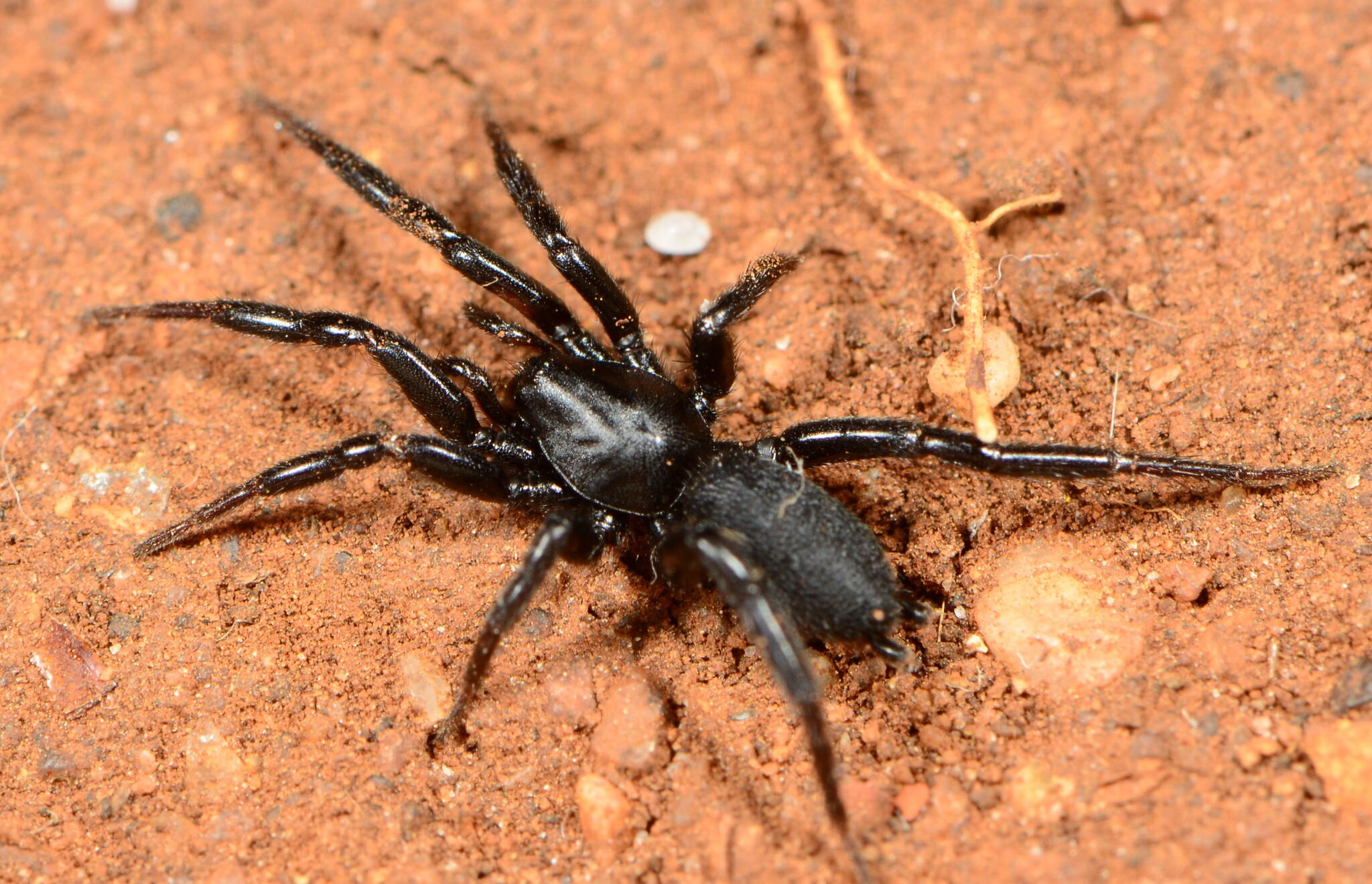
- Female
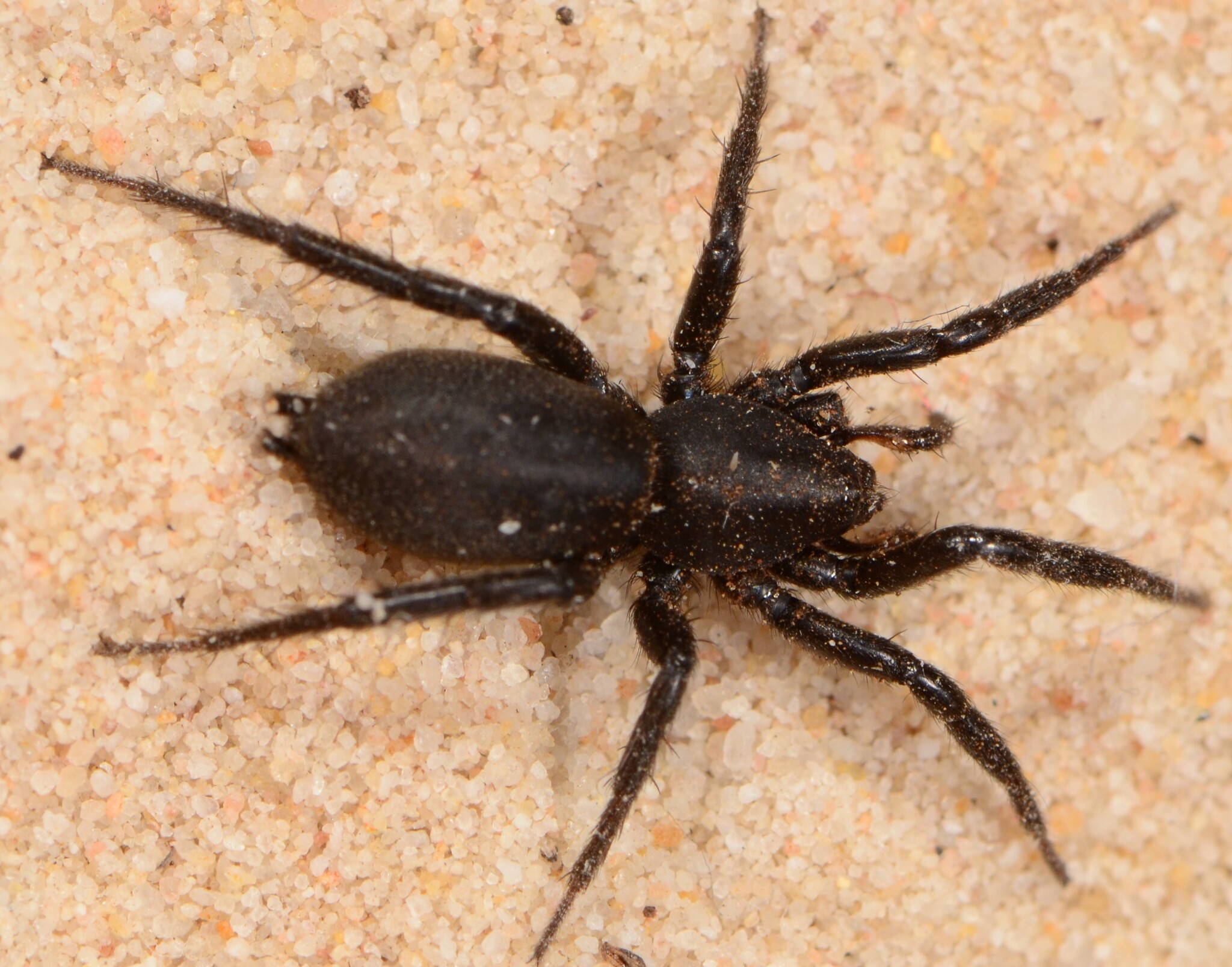
- Female

Scientific classification
- Kingdom: Animalia
- Phylum: Arthropoda
- Subphylum: Chelicerata
- Class: Arachnida
- Order: Araneae
- Infraorder: Araneomorphae
- Family: Gnaphosidae
- Genus: Zelotes
- Species: Z. fuligineus

Binomial name
- Zelotes fuligineus (Purcell, 1907)

Synonyms
- Melanophora fuliginea Purcell, 1907; Melanophora simoni Purcell, 1907; Melanophora montana Purcell, 1907; Melanophora aculeata Purcell, 1908; Prosthesima montana Tullgren, 1910; Melanophora fuliginoides Hewitt, 1915; Zelotes montanus Tucker, 1923; Zelotes simoni Tucker, 1923; Zelotes fuliginoides Tucker, 1923

= Zelotes fuligineus =

Species of spider

Zelotes fuligineus is a species of spider in the family Gnaphosidae.

== Distribution ==
Zelotes fuligineus is a common African spider in Ethiopia, Democratic Republic of the Congo, Kenya, Tanzania, Namibia, South Africa, and Lesotho. In South Africa, it has been sampled from all provinces, at altitudes ranging from 6 to 2,998 m above sea level.

The species was originally described from Signal Hill, Cape Town, and has an extensive distribution across the country.

== Habitat and ecology ==
The species inhabits all the floral biomes: Fynbos, Grassland, Nama Karoo, and Savanna. These are free-running spiders that are found under stones. The species has also been sampled from citrus and pistachio orchards.

== Description ==
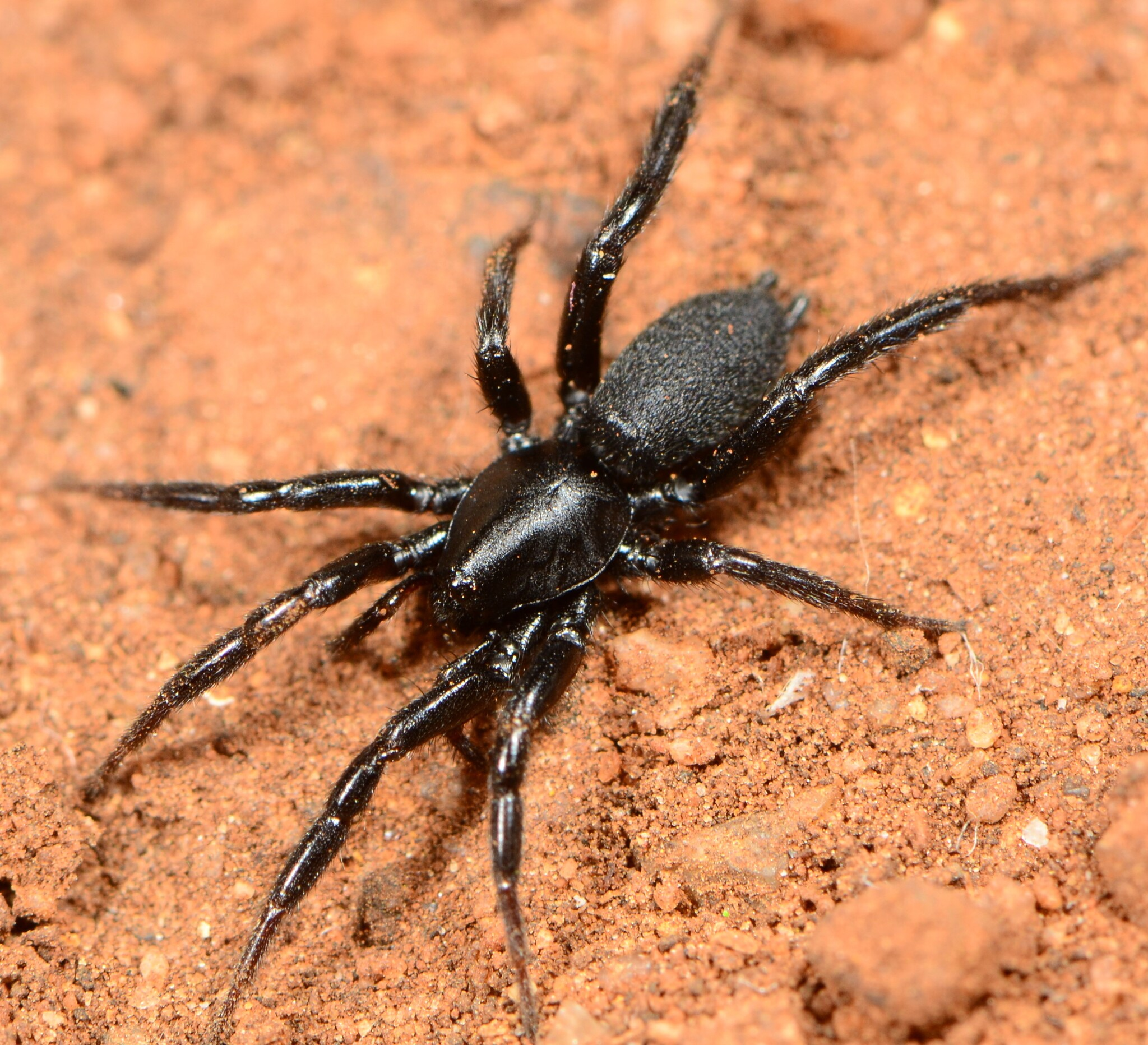
female

== Conservation ==
Zelotes fuligineus is listed as Least Concern by the South African National Biodiversity Institute due to its wide geographic range. There are no significant threats to the species and it is protected in more than ten protected areas.

== Taxonomy ==
The species was originally described by Purcell in 1907 from Signal Hill, Cape Town as Melanophora fuliginea. Multiple species were later synonymized with Z. fuligineus by FitzPatrick in 2007. The species is known from both sexes.
