= Xerophaeus patricki =

Mozambique Mouse Ground Spider

Scientific classification
- Kingdom: Animalia
- Phylum: Arthropoda
- Subphylum: Chelicerata
- Class: Arachnida
- Order: Araneae
- Infraorder: Araneomorphae
- Family: Gnaphosidae
- Genus: Xerophaeus
- Species: X. patricki

Binomial name
- Xerophaeus patricki Purcell, 1907

Species of spider

Xerophaeus patricki is a species of spider in the family Gnaphosidae. It occurs in southern Africa and is commonly known as the Mozambique mouse ground spider.

== Distribution ==
Xerophaeus patricki is recorded from Mozambique and South Africa. In South Africa, it is known from Gauteng and Limpopo.

== Habitat and ecology ==
The species inhabits the Grassland and Savanna biomes at altitudes ranging from 840 to 1457 m above sea level. Xerophaeus patricki are free-living ground dwellers.

== Conservation ==
Xerophaeus patricki is listed as Least Concern by the South African National Biodiversity Institute due to its wide range in southern Africa. There are no significant threats to the species.

== Taxonomy ==
The species was originally described by W. F. Purcell in 1907 from Mozambique. The species has not been revised and is known only from the male.
