= Xerophaeus spiralifer =

Eierfontein Mouse Ground Spider

Conservation status
- Least Concern (SANBI Red List)

Scientific classification
- Kingdom: Animalia
- Phylum: Arthropoda
- Subphylum: Chelicerata
- Class: Arachnida
- Order: Araneae
- Infraorder: Araneomorphae
- Family: Gnaphosidae
- Genus: Xerophaeus
- Species: X. spiralifer

Binomial name
- Xerophaeus spiralifer Purcell, 1907

Species of spider

Xerophaeus spiralifer is a species of spider in the family Gnaphosidae. It is endemic to South Africa and is commonly known as the Eierfontein mouse ground spider.

== Distribution ==
Xerophaeus spiralifer is recorded from two South African provinces: the Northern Cape and Western Cape.

== Habitat and ecology ==
The species inhabits the Nama Karoo and Savanna biomes at altitudes ranging from 868 to 1408 m above sea level. Xerophaeus spiralifer are free-living ground dwellers.

== Conservation ==
Xerophaeus spiralifer is listed as Least Concern by the South African National Biodiversity Institute due to its wide geographic range. The species is protected in Benfontein Game Reserve and there are no significant threats.

== Taxonomy ==
The species was originally described by W. F. Purcell in 1907 from Hanover. The species has not been revised but is known from both sexes.
