= Xerophaeus exiguus =

Scientific classification
- Kingdom: Animalia
- Phylum: Arthropoda
- Subphylum: Chelicerata
- Class: Arachnida
- Order: Araneae
- Infraorder: Araneomorphae
- Family: Gnaphosidae
- Genus: Xerophaeus
- Species: X. exiguus

Binomial name
- Xerophaeus exiguus Purcell, 1907

Species of spider

Xerophaeus exiguus is a species of spider in the family Gnaphosidae. It is endemic to South Africa.

== Distribution ==
Xerophaeus exiguus is recorded from two South African provinces: the Eastern Cape and Western Cape.

== Habitat and ecology ==
The species inhabits the Thicket and Fynbos biomes at altitudes ranging from 237 to 648 m above sea level. Xerophaeus exiguus are free-living ground dwellers.

== Conservation ==
Xerophaeus exiguus is listed as Data Deficient. The three known records of this species were all sampled prior to 1907. Too little is known about the location, range and current status of this taxon for an assessment to be made. More sampling is needed to determine the species' range. Threats are unknown.

== Taxonomy ==
The species was originally described by W. F. Purcell in 1907 from Laingsburg. The species has not been revised but is known from both sexes.
