= Xerophaeus ahenus =

Steinkopf Mouse Ground Spider

Conservation status
- Least Concern (SANBI Red List)

Scientific classification
- Kingdom: Animalia
- Phylum: Arthropoda
- Subphylum: Chelicerata
- Class: Arachnida
- Order: Araneae
- Infraorder: Araneomorphae
- Family: Gnaphosidae
- Genus: Xerophaeus
- Species: X. ahenus

Binomial name
- Xerophaeus ahenus Purcell, 1908

Species of spider

Xerophaeus ahenus is a species of spider in the family Gnaphosidae. It is endemic to South Africa and is commonly known as the Steinkopf mouse ground spider.

== Distribution ==
Xerophaeus ahenus is known from two South African provinces: the Northern Cape and Western Cape.

== Habitat and ecology ==
The species inhabits multiple biomes including Fynbos and Succulent Karoo biomes at altitudes ranging from 109 to 991 m above sea level.

Xerophaeus ahenus are free-living ground dwellers.

== Description ==
Xerophaeus ahenus is known only from females. The cephalothorax is coppery-red in colour, with testaceous legs and a pale fulvous-yellow opisthosoma. The chelicerae and sternum are red. The total size is 10.5 mm.

== Conservation ==
Xerophaeus ahenus is listed as Least Concern by the South African National Biodiversity Institute due to its wide range. There are no significant threats to the species, though more sampling is needed to collect the male.

== Taxonomy ==
The species was originally described by W. F. Purcell in 1908 from Steinkopf in the Northern Cape. The species has not been revised and remains known only from the female.
