= Xerophaeus crustosus =

Scientific classification
- Kingdom: Animalia
- Phylum: Arthropoda
- Subphylum: Chelicerata
- Class: Arachnida
- Order: Araneae
- Infraorder: Araneomorphae
- Family: Gnaphosidae
- Genus: Xerophaeus
- Species: X. crustosus

Binomial name
- Xerophaeus crustosus Purcell, 1907

Species of spider

Xerophaeus crustosus is a species of spider in the family Gnaphosidae. It is endemic to South Africa.

== Distribution ==
Xerophaeus crustosus is endemic to the Eastern Cape where it has been sampled from a few localities.

== Habitat and ecology ==
The species inhabits the Thicket biome at altitudes ranging from 16 to 587 m above sea level. Xerophaeus crustosus are free-living ground dwellers.

== Conservation ==
Xerophaeus crustosus is listed as Data Deficient for taxonomic reasons. The species is protected in Addo Elephant National Park, but more sampling is needed to collect females and to more accurately determine the species range.

== Taxonomy ==
The species was originally described by W. F. Purcell in 1907 from East London. The species has not been revised and is known only from the male.
