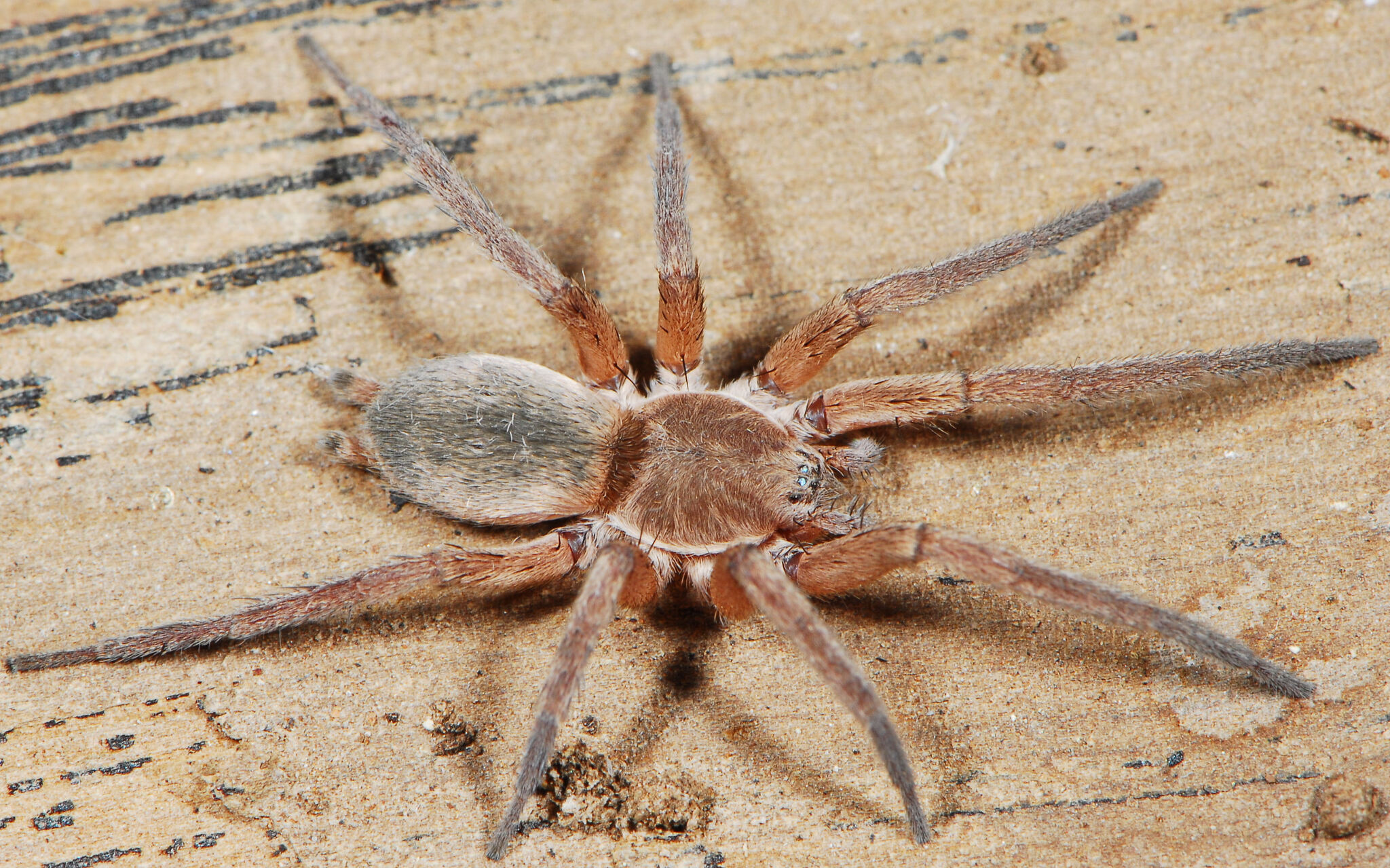
- female

Scientific classification
- Kingdom: Animalia
- Phylum: Arthropoda
- Subphylum: Chelicerata
- Class: Arachnida
- Order: Araneae
- Infraorder: Araneomorphae
- Family: Gnaphosidae
- Genus: Xerophaeus
- Species: X. aurariarum

Binomial name
- Xerophaeus aurariarum Purcell, 1907

= Xerophaeus aurariarum =

Johannesburg Mouse Ground Spider

Species of spider

Xerophaeus aurariarum is a species of spider in the family Gnaphosidae. It occurs in southern Africa and is commonly known as the Johannesburg mouse ground spider.

== Distribution ==
Xerophaeus aurariarum is recorded from Namibia and South Africa. In South Africa, it has a wide distribution throughout the country including Eastern Cape, Free State, Gauteng, Limpopo, Mpumalanga, Northern Cape, North West, and Western Cape.

== Habitat and ecology ==
The species inhabits multiple biomes including Fynbos, Grassland, Nama Karoo, and Savanna biomes at altitudes ranging from 4 to 2329 m above sea level. Xerophaeus aurariarum are free-living ground dwellers.

== Description ==
Xerophaeus aurariarum is known from both sexes. The carapace is dark testaceous clothed with appressed hair. The opisthosoma is very slightly darker, also clothed with dark hair; anterior dorsal scutum shows as a small brown patch in males. Legs are dark testaceous clothed with appressed hair. Total size is 5-6 mm in females and 3-4 mm in males.

== Conservation ==
Xerophaeus aurariarum is listed as Least Concern by the South African National Biodiversity Institute due to its wide range. The species is protected in ten protected areas and there are no known threats.

== Taxonomy ==
The species was originally described by W. F. Purcell in 1907 from the Witwatersrand in Gauteng, South Africa. The species has not been revised but is known from both sexes.
