= Xerophaeus flammeus =

Scientific classification
- Kingdom: Animalia
- Phylum: Arthropoda
- Subphylum: Chelicerata
- Class: Arachnida
- Order: Araneae
- Infraorder: Araneomorphae
- Family: Gnaphosidae
- Genus: Xerophaeus
- Species: X. flammeus

Binomial name
- Xerophaeus flammeus Tucker, 1923

Species of spider

Xerophaeus flammeus is a species of spider in the family Gnaphosidae. It is endemic to South Africa.

== Distribution ==
Xerophaeus flammeus is endemic to the Western Cape and is known only from the type locality Maitland Flats.

== Habitat and ecology ==
The species inhabits the Fynbos biome at an altitude of 12 m above sea level. Xerophaeus flammeus are free-living ground dwellers.

== Conservation ==
Xerophaeus flammeus is listed as Data Deficient for taxonomic reasons. The material is very old and too little is known about the location, range and threats of this taxon for an assessment to be made. More sampling is needed to collect males and determine the species' range.

== Taxonomy ==
The species was originally described by Tucker in 1923 from Maitland Flats. The species has not been revised and is known only from the female.
