= Xerophaeus tenebrosus =

Conservation status
- Least Concern (SANBI Red List)

Scientific classification
- Kingdom: Animalia
- Phylum: Arthropoda
- Subphylum: Chelicerata
- Class: Arachnida
- Order: Araneae
- Infraorder: Araneomorphae
- Family: Gnaphosidae
- Genus: Xerophaeus
- Species: X. tenebrosus

Binomial name
- Xerophaeus tenebrosus Tucker, 1923

Species of spider

Xerophaeus tenebrosus is a species of spider in the family Gnaphosidae. It is endemic to South Africa.

== Distribution ==
Xerophaeus tenebrosus is recorded from three South African provinces, KwaZulu-Natal, the Northern Cape, and Western Cape.

== Habitat and ecology ==
The species inhabits multiple biomes including Forest, Savanna, and Nama Karoo biomes at altitudes ranging from 83 to 1078 m above sea level. Xerophaeus tenebrosus are free-living ground dwellers.

== Description ==
Xerophaeus tenebrosus is known only from females.

== Conservation ==
Xerophaeus tenebrosus is listed as Least Concern by the South African National Biodiversity Institute due to its wide geographical range. The species is suspected to be under sampled. It is protected in Mkuze Nature Reserve and Namaqua National Park and there are no significant threats.

== Taxonomy ==
The species was originally described by Tucker in 1923 from Knysna. The species has not been revised and is known only from the female.
