= Xerophaeus maritimus =

Scientific classification
- Kingdom: Animalia
- Phylum: Arthropoda
- Subphylum: Chelicerata
- Class: Arachnida
- Order: Araneae
- Infraorder: Araneomorphae
- Family: Gnaphosidae
- Genus: Xerophaeus
- Species: X. maritimus

Binomial name
- Xerophaeus maritimus Lawrence, 1938

Species of spider

Xerophaeus maritimus is a species of spider in the family Gnaphosidae. It is endemic to South Africa.

== Distribution ==
Xerophaeus maritimus is endemic to KwaZulu-Natal.

== Habitat and ecology ==
The species inhabits the Savanna biome at altitudes ranging from 42 to 405 m above sea level. Xerophaeus maritimus are free-living ground dwellers.

== Conservation ==
Xerophaeus maritimus is listed as Data Deficient for taxonomic reasons. The species is protected in Ophathe Game Reserve and uMkhuze Game Reserve. More sampling is needed to collect males and to more accurately determine the species' range.

== Taxonomy ==
The species was originally described by R. F. Lawrence in 1938 from Umhlali, KwaZulu-Natal. The species has not been revised and is known only from the female.
