= Smut =

Smut may refer to:

- Smut (fungus), a group of plant parasitic fungi
- A colloquial term for obscenity in general, or pornography in particular
- Erotic literature, sometimes referred to as "smut"
- Smut (comics), an adult British comic title dating back to the 1980s
- Smut, a band based in Chicago, Illinois
- Jimmy Means, a former NASCAR driver nicknamed "Smut"
- "Smut", a song by Tom Lehrer from his 1965 album That Was the Year That Was, referencing the colloquial meaning of the term
