= Xerophaeus anthropoides =

Roodeplaat Mouse Ground Spider

Conservation status
- Least Concern (SANBI Red List)

Scientific classification
- Kingdom: Animalia
- Phylum: Arthropoda
- Subphylum: Chelicerata
- Class: Arachnida
- Order: Araneae
- Infraorder: Araneomorphae
- Family: Gnaphosidae
- Genus: Xerophaeus
- Species: X. anthropoides

Binomial name
- Xerophaeus anthropoides Hewitt, 1916

Species of spider

Xerophaeus anthropoides is a species of spider in the family Gnaphosidae. It is endemic to South Africa and is commonly known as the Roodeplaat mouse ground spider.

== Distribution ==
Xerophaeus anthropoides is recorded from four South African provinces: Gauteng, Mpumalanga, Northern Cape, and North West.

== Habitat and ecology ==
The species inhabits the Savanna biome at altitudes ranging from 1218 to 1647 m above sea level. Xerophaeus anthropoides are free-living ground dwellers.

== Conservation ==
Xerophaeus anthropoides is listed as Least Concern by the South African National Biodiversity Institute due to its wide geographical range. The species is protected in Roodeplaatdam Nature Reserve and Klipriviersberg Nature Reserve. There are no significant threats to the species, though more sampling is needed to collect males.

== Taxonomy ==
The species was originally described by John Hewitt in 1916 from Roodeplaatdam in Gauteng. The species has not been revised and remains known only from the female.
