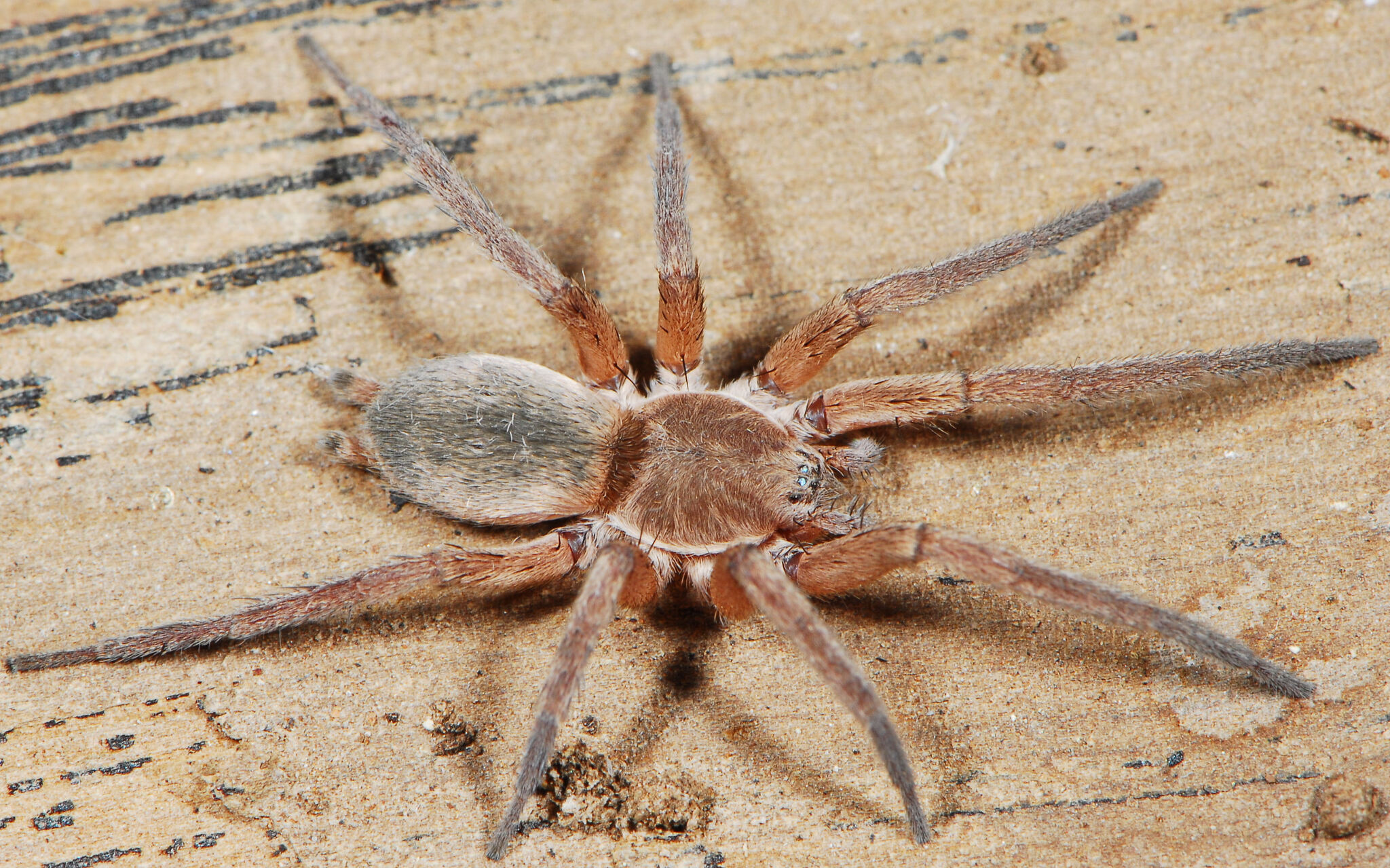
- female X. appendiculatus
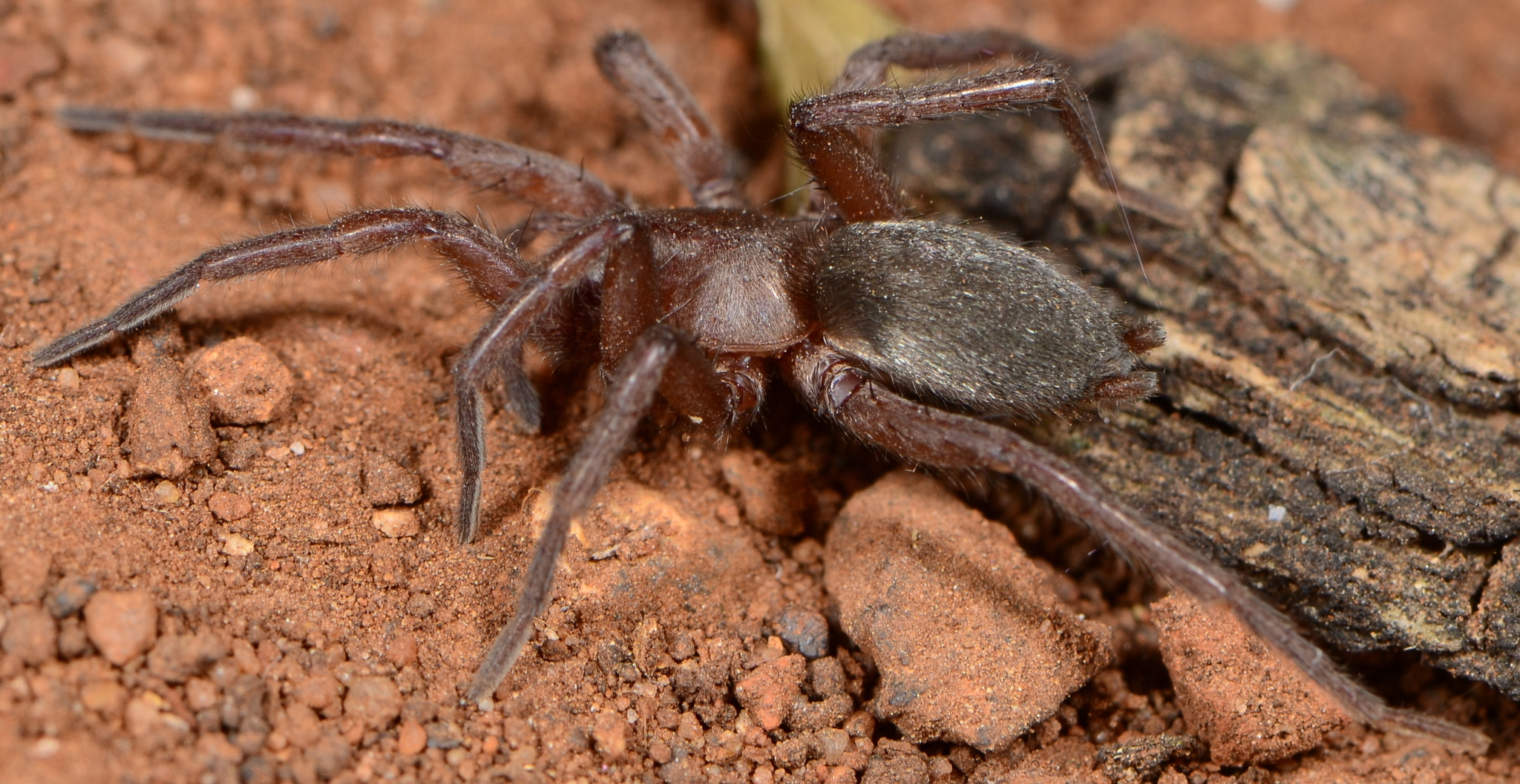
- female X. bicavus

Scientific classification
- Kingdom: Animalia
- Phylum: Arthropoda
- Subphylum: Chelicerata
- Class: Arachnida
- Order: Araneae
- Infraorder: Araneomorphae
- Family: Gnaphosidae
- Genus: Xerophaeus; Purcell, 1907

Type species
- X. capensis Purcell, 1907

Species
- 41, see text

= Xerophaeus =

Genus of spiders

Xerophaeus is a genus of ground spiders that was first described by William Frederick Purcell in 1907.

== Description ==
There are no distinct patterns on the body of these medium sized ground dwellers. The body and legs are clothed with dense appressed setae and the male has a small brown scutum. Carapace moderately convex, attenuated in front, with thoracic striae.

The anterior row of eyes is strongly procurved; anterior median eyes large; posterior row of eyes wider, moderately or strongly procurved; posterior median eyes generally large, obliquely oval or angular and rather close together; lateral eyes of each side much closer together than the anterior and posterior median eyes.

The chelicera are hardly or not attenuated at apex, with three (sometimes two) superior teeth and one inferior tooth, the latter absent in some species; sternum rather broad in front, or, at any rate, not strongly attenuated nor produced. Abdomen of male scutate above at base. Legs generally rather short and robust, the anterior pairs spined below on the metatarsi and tarsi; tarsi and anterior metatarsi scopulate to the base, the posterior metatarsi and often also the anterior tibia scopulate distally.

== Taxonomy ==
This genus has not been revised. This genus is evidently closely allied to Scotophaeus, which differs from it, according to Simon's diagnosis, principally in having the sternum strongly attenuated in front. In Scotophaeus also, both rows of eyes are apparently straighter, the chelicera more strongly attenuated at apex and the head more depressed (Purcell, 1907). Most of the Xerophaeus species have been described by Purcell (1907, 1908) and Tucker (1923).

X. zuluense was transferred to Xerophaeus zuluensis in 2025.

== Species ==
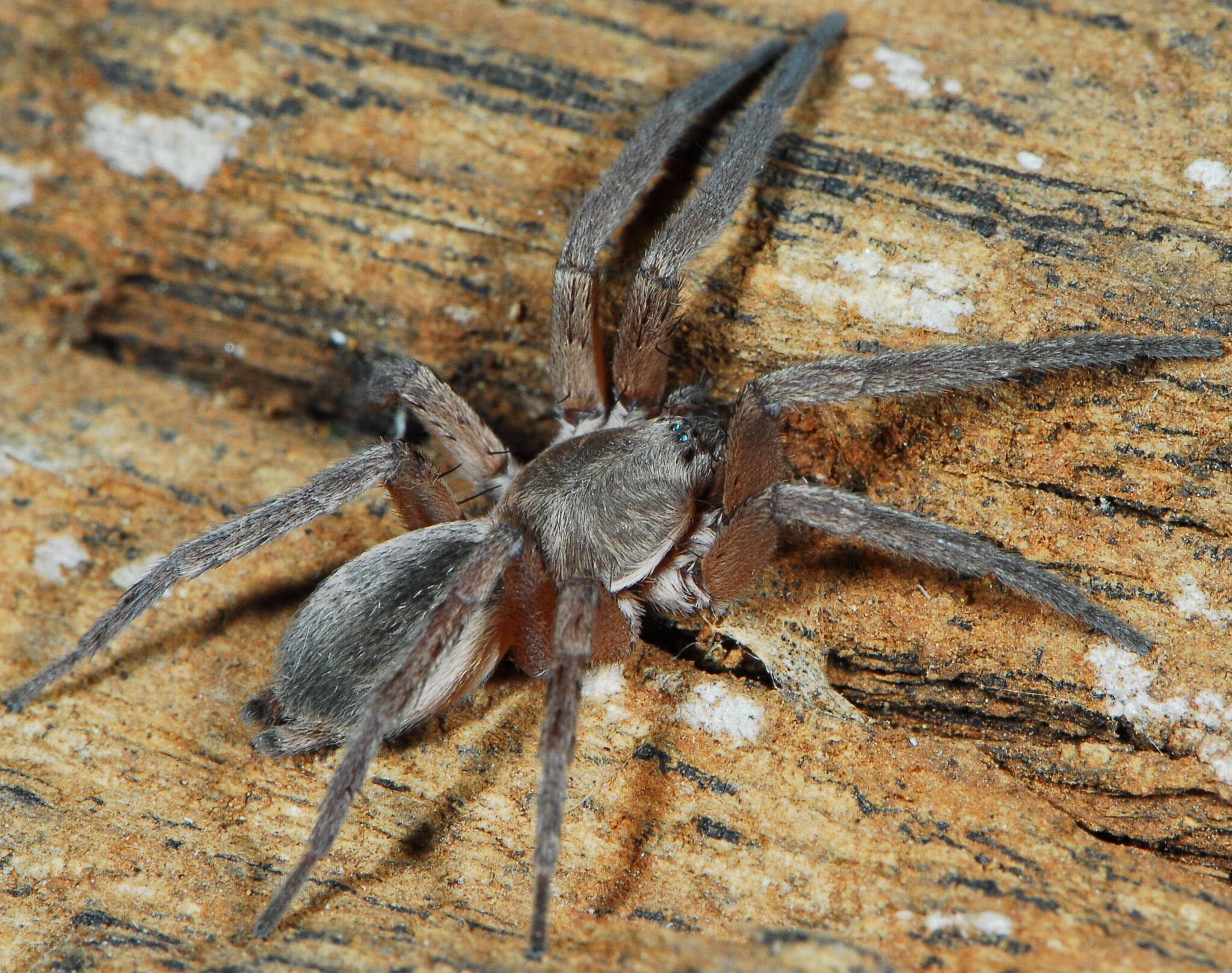
female X. aurariarum

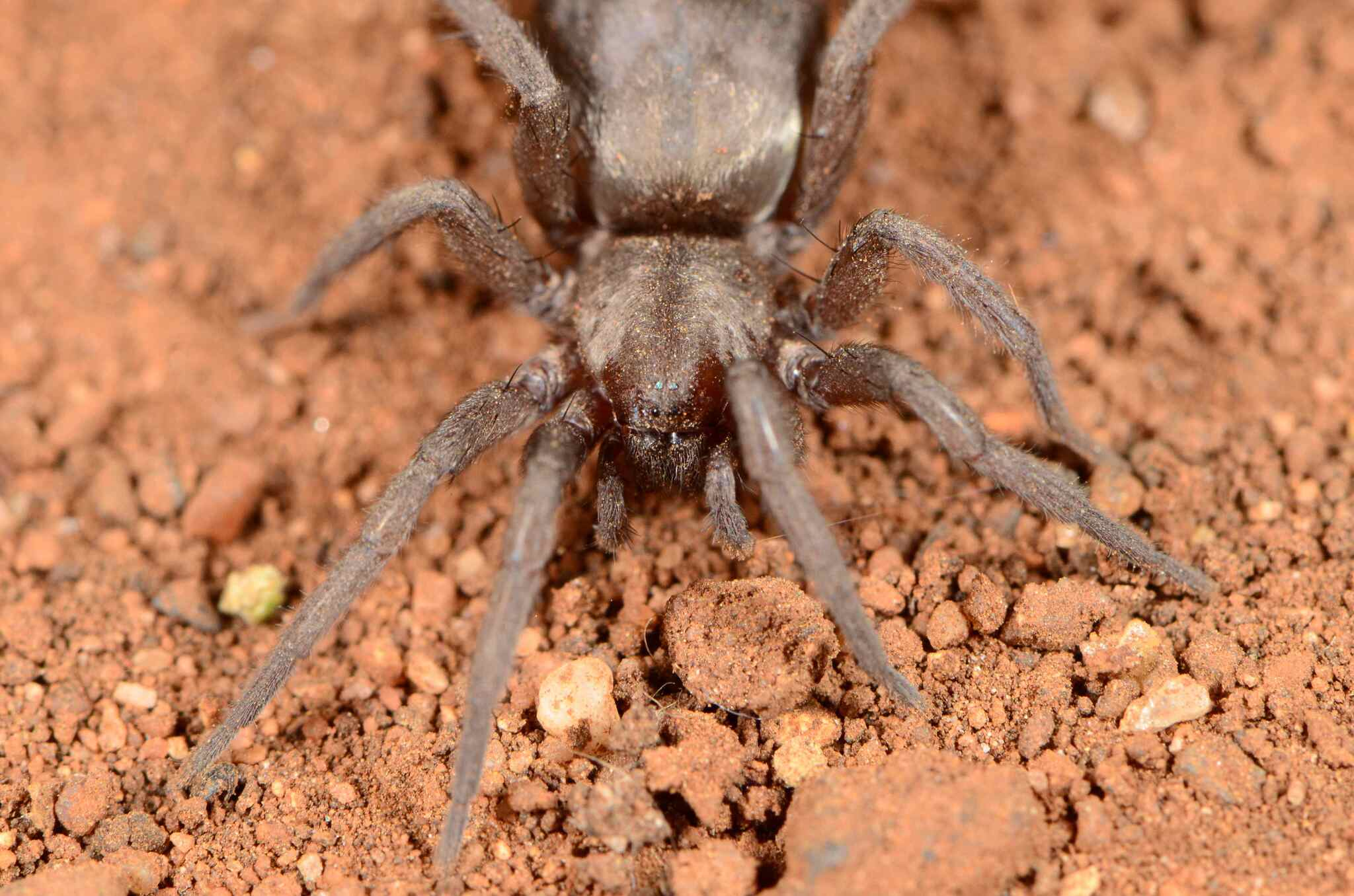
female X. aridus

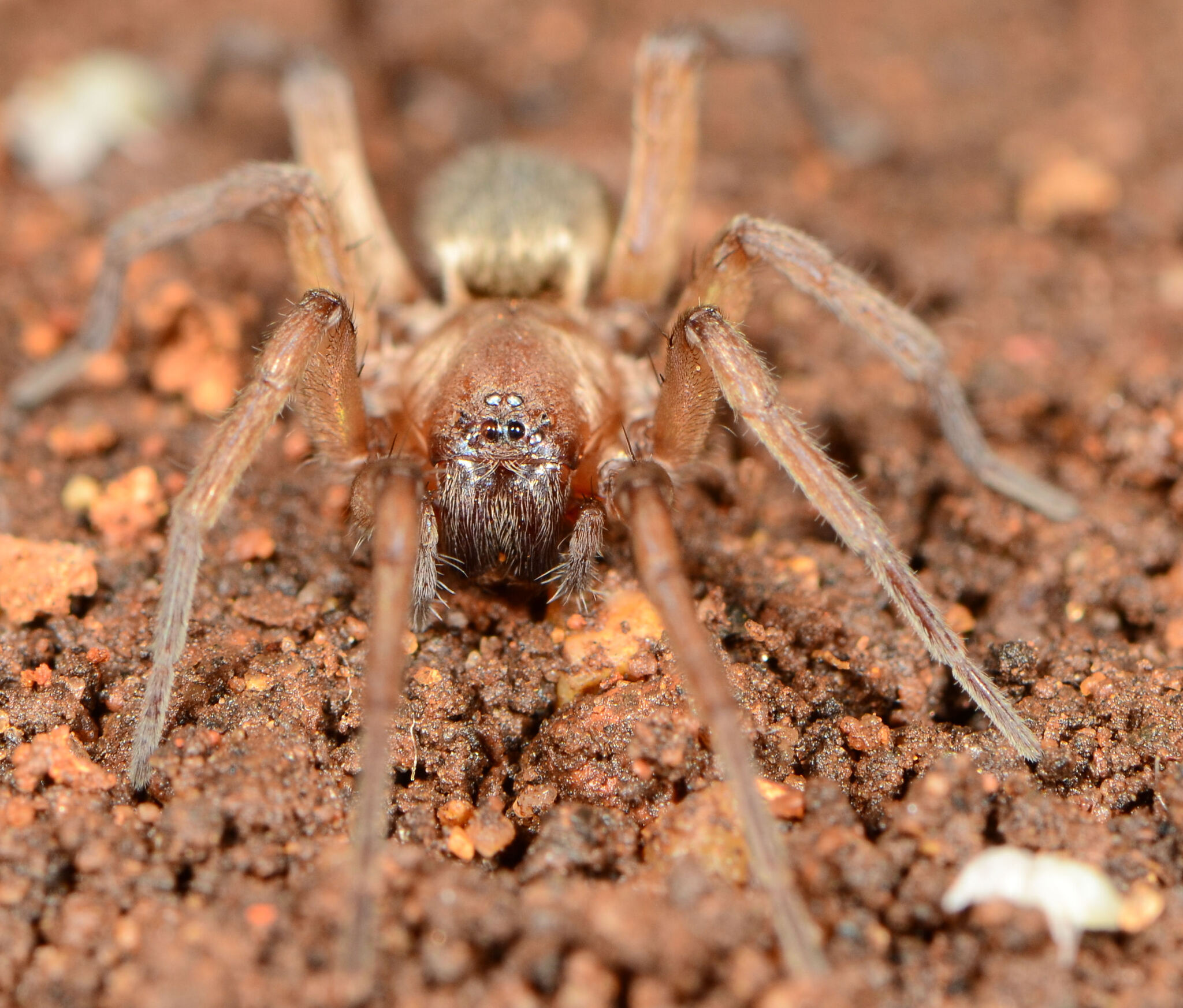
female X. vickermani

As of September 2025 it contains forty-one species and one subspecies:

- Xerophaeus ahenus Purcell, 1908 – South Africa
- Xerophaeus anthropoides Hewitt, 1916 – South Africa
- Xerophaeus appendiculatus Purcell, 1907 – South Africa
- Xerophaeus aridus Purcell, 1907 – Namibia, South Africa
- Xerophaeus aurariarum Purcell, 1907 – Namibia, South Africa
- Xerophaeus bicavus Tucker, 1923 – South Africa
- Xerophaeus biplagiatus Tullgren, 1910 – Tanzania, South Africa
- Xerophaeus capensis Purcell, 1907 – South Africa (type species)
- Xerophaeus communis Purcell, 1907 – South Africa
- Xerophaeus coruscus (L. Koch, 1875) – Ethiopia, Tanzania, South Africa, Yemen
  - Xerophaeus coruscus kibonotensis Tullgren, 1910 – Tanzania
- Xerophaeus crusculus Tucker, 1923 – South Africa
- Xerophaeus crustosus Purcell, 1907 – South Africa
- Xerophaeus druryi Tucker, 1923 – South Africa
- Xerophaeus espoir Platnick, 1981 – Seychelles
- Xerophaeus exiguus Purcell, 1907 – South Africa
- Xerophaeus flammeus Tucker, 1923 – South Africa
- Xerophaeus flavescens Purcell, 1907 – South Africa
- Xerophaeus hottentottus Purcell, 1908 – South Africa
- Xerophaeus kiwuensis Strand, 1913 – Central Africa
- Xerophaeus lightfooti Purcell, 1907 – South Africa
- Xerophaeus longispina Purcell, 1908 – South Africa
- Xerophaeus lunulifer Purcell, 1907 – South Africa
- Xerophaeus maritimus Lawrence, 1938 – South Africa
- Xerophaeus matroosbergensis Tucker, 1923 – South Africa
- Xerophaeus occiduus Tucker, 1923 – South Africa
- Xerophaeus oceanicus Schmidt & Jocqué, 1983 – Réunion
- Xerophaeus pallidus Tucker, 1923 – South Africa
- Xerophaeus patricki Purcell, 1907 – Mozambique, South Africa
- Xerophaeus perversus Purcell, 1923 – Namibia
- Xerophaeus phaseolus Tucker, 1923 – South Africa
- Xerophaeus robustus Lawrence, 1936 – South Africa
- Xerophaeus rostratus Purcell, 1907 – South Africa
- Xerophaeus ruandanus Strand, 1913 – Rwanda
- Xerophaeus rubeus Tucker, 1923 – South Africa, Lesotho
- Xerophaeus silvaticus Tucker, 1923 – South Africa
- Xerophaeus spiralifer Purcell, 1907 – South Africa
- Xerophaeus spoliator Purcell, 1907 – Namibia, South Africa
- Xerophaeus tenebrosus Tucker, 1923 – South Africa
- Xerophaeus thomasi (Caporiacco, 1949) – Kenya
- Xerophaeus vickermani Tucker, 1923 – South Africa
