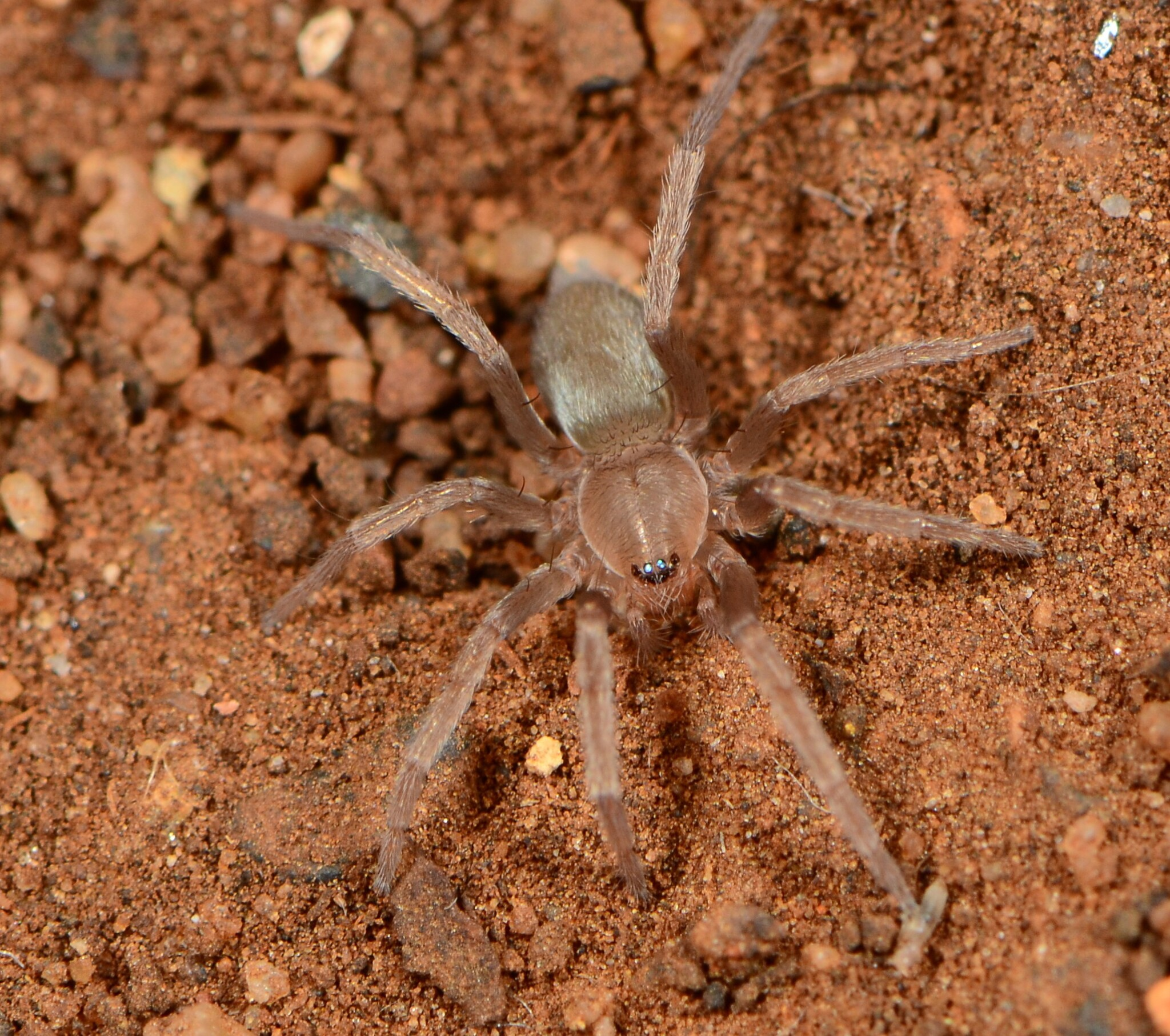
- female
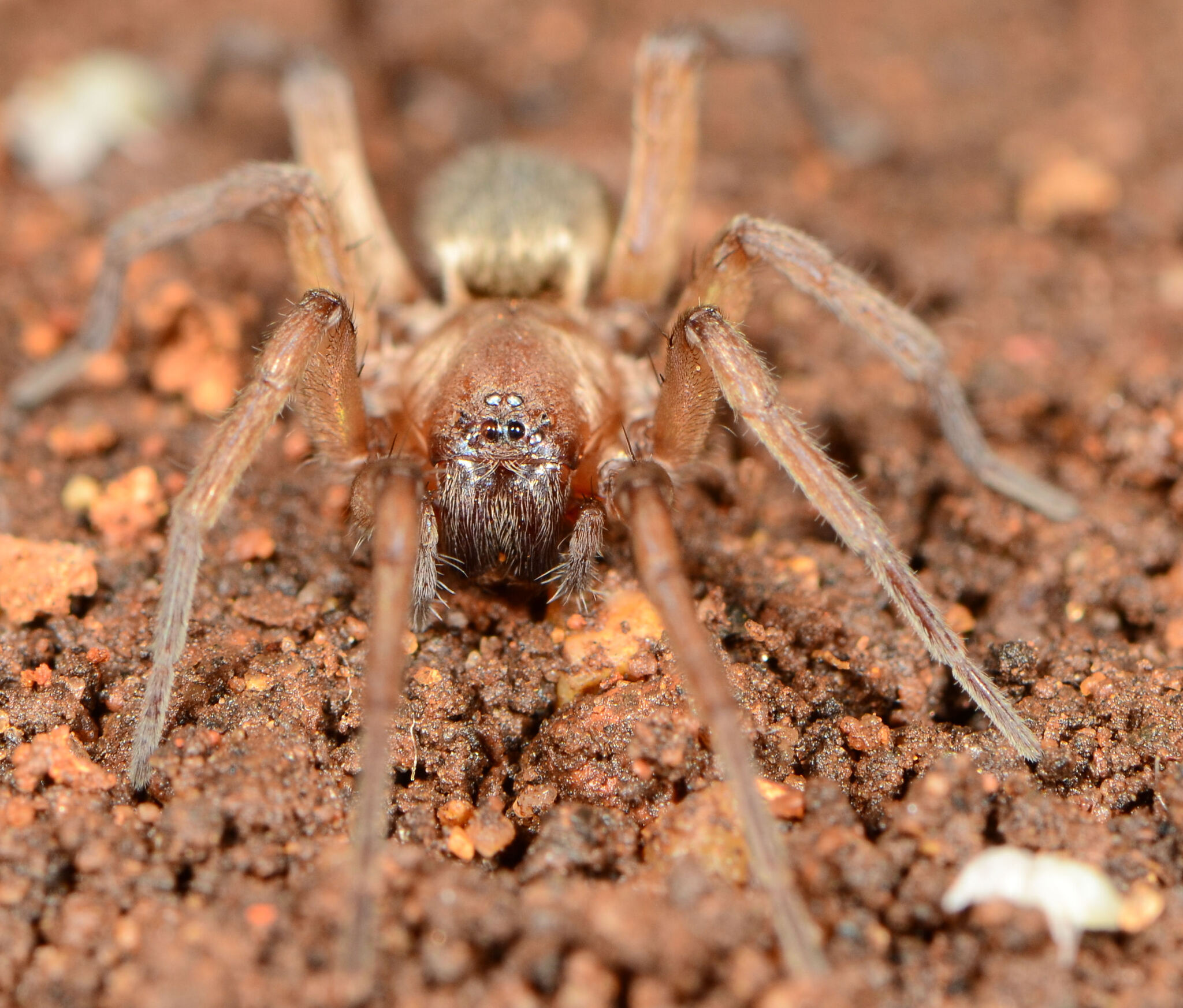
- female

Scientific classification
- Kingdom: Animalia
- Phylum: Arthropoda
- Subphylum: Chelicerata
- Class: Arachnida
- Order: Araneae
- Infraorder: Araneomorphae
- Family: Gnaphosidae
- Genus: Xerophaeus
- Species: X. vickermani

Binomial name
- Xerophaeus vickermani Tucker, 1923

= Xerophaeus vickermani =

Marico Mouse Ground Spider

Species of spider

Xerophaeus vickermani is a species of spider in the family Gnaphosidae. It is endemic to South Africa and is commonly known as the Marico mouse ground spider.

== Distribution ==
Xerophaeus vickermani is recorded from the South African provinces Free State, Gauteng, Limpopo, Mpumalanga, Northern Cape, and North West.

== Habitat and ecology ==
The species inhabits multiple biomes including Grassland, Nama Karoo, and Savanna biomes at altitudes ranging from 163 to 1558 m above sea level. Xerophaeus vickermani are free-living ground dwellers and have been sampled from pistachio orchards.

== Conservation ==
Xerophaeus vickermani is listed as Least Concern by the South African National Biodiversity Institute due to its wide geographic range. The species is protected in five protected areas including Amanzi Private Game Reserve, Kalkfontein Dam Nature Reserve, Faerie Glen Nature Reserve, Ezemvelo Nature Reserve, and Rooipoort Nature Reserve. There are no significant threats.

== Taxonomy ==
The species was originally described by Tucker in 1923 from the junction of the Marico and Crocodile Rivers in North West. X. vickermani has not been revised but is known from both sexes.
