= Xerophaeus phaseolus =

Scientific classification
- Kingdom: Animalia
- Phylum: Arthropoda
- Subphylum: Chelicerata
- Class: Arachnida
- Order: Araneae
- Infraorder: Araneomorphae
- Family: Gnaphosidae
- Genus: Xerophaeus
- Species: X. phaseolus

Binomial name
- Xerophaeus phaseolus Tucker, 1923

Species of spider

Xerophaeus phaseolus is a species of spider in the family Gnaphosidae. It is endemic to South Africa.

== Distribution ==
Xerophaeus phaseolus is endemic to the Western Cape.

== Habitat and ecology ==
The species inhabits multiple biomes including Fynbos, Succulent Karoo, and Thicket biomes at altitudes ranging from 3 to 588 m above sea level. Xerophaeus phaseolus are free-living ground dwellers.

== Conservation ==
Xerophaeus phaseolus is listed as Data Deficient for taxonomic reasons, though it has a wide geographical range. The species is protected in De Hoop Nature Reserve and Swartberg Nature Reserve. There are no significant threats.

== Taxonomy ==
The species was originally described by Tucker in 1923 from St Helena Bay, Steenberg Cove. The species has not been revised and is known only from the female.
