= Smuts =

Smuts is an Afrikaans surname most commonly associated with Jan Smuts (1870–1950), a South African statesman, military leader and prime minister of the Union of South Africa. Other notable people with the surname include:

- Barbara Smuts (born 1950), American anthropologist
- Dave Smuts (David, flor. 1980–2023..), Namibian Supreme Court judge
- Dene Smuts (1949–2016), South African politician
- JJ Smuts (Jon-Jon Trevor, born 1988), South African cricketer
- J. J. L. Smuts (Johannes Joachim Lodewyk, 1785–1869), South African public official
- John Christopher Smuts (1910–1979), known as Christopher Smuts, South African-born British politician
- Kelly Smuts (born 1990), South African cricketer
- Lulama Smuts Ngonyama (born 1952), known as Smuts Ngonyama, South African politician
- Neil Smuts (1898–?), South African aviator
- Olive Smuts-Kennedy (1925–2013), New Zealand politician
- Tobias Smuts (1861–1916), Boer war Boer general

== See also ==
- Smut (disambiguation)
