= Xerophaeus coruscus =

Tanzania Mouse Ground Spider

Conservation status
- Least Concern (SANBI Red List)

Scientific classification
- Kingdom: Animalia
- Phylum: Arthropoda
- Subphylum: Chelicerata
- Class: Arachnida
- Order: Araneae
- Infraorder: Araneomorphae
- Family: Gnaphosidae
- Genus: Xerophaeus
- Species: X. coruscus

Binomial name
- Xerophaeus coruscus (L. Koch, 1875)

Species of spider

Xerophaeus coruscus is a species of spider in the family Gnaphosidae. It occurs in Africa and is commonly known as the Tanzania mouse ground spider.

== Distribution ==
Xerophaeus coruscus is recorded from Ethiopia, Tanzania, South Africa, and Yemen. In South Africa, it is known only from the Eastern Cape.

== Habitat and ecology ==
The species inhabits the Thicket biome at an altitude of 1333 m above sea level. Xerophaeus coruscus are free-living ground dwellers.

== Conservation ==
Xerophaeus coruscus is listed as Least Concern by the South African National Biodiversity Institute due to its wide geographic range in Africa. There are no significant threats to the species.

== Taxonomy ==
The species was originally described by L. Koch in 1875 from Tanzania as Drassus coruscus. The species has not been revised but is known from both sexes.
