= Xerophaeus crusculus =

Winterhoek Mouse Ground Spider

Conservation status
- Least Concern (SANBI Red List)

Scientific classification
- Kingdom: Animalia
- Phylum: Arthropoda
- Subphylum: Chelicerata
- Class: Arachnida
- Order: Araneae
- Infraorder: Araneomorphae
- Family: Gnaphosidae
- Genus: Xerophaeus
- Species: X. crusculus

Binomial name
- Xerophaeus crusculus Tucker, 1923

Species of spider

Xerophaeus crusculus is a species of spider in the family Gnaphosidae. It is endemic to South Africa and is commonly known as the Winterhoek mouse ground spider.

== Distribution ==
Xerophaeus crusculus is recorded from four South African provinces: the Eastern Cape, KwaZulu-Natal, Northern Cape, and Western Cape.

== Habitat and ecology ==
The species inhabits multiple biomes including Fynbos, Savanna, Succulent Karoo, and Thicket biomes at altitudes ranging from 15 to 2892 m above sea level. Xerophaeus crusculus are free-living ground dwellers.

== Conservation ==
Xerophaeus crusculus is listed as Least Concern by the South African National Biodiversity Institute due to its wide range. The species is protected in Namaqua National Park, De Hoop Nature Reserve, Anysberg Nature Reserve, and Kogelberg Biosphere Reserve. There are no significant threats.

== Taxonomy ==
The species was originally described by Tucker in 1923 from the Great Winterhoek Mountains. The species has not been revised but is known from both sexes.
