= Trichotoma =

Scientific classification
- Domain: Eukaryota
- Kingdom: Animalia
- Phylum: Arthropoda
- Subphylum: Chelicerata
- Class: Arachnida
- Order: Solifugae
- Family: Gylippidae
- Genus: Trichotoma; Lawrence, 1968

Type species
- Trichotoma brunnea Lawrence, 1968

Species
- 3, see text

Genus of camel spiders

Trichotoma is a genus of gylippid camel spiders, first described by Reginald Frederick Lawrence in 1968.

== Species ==
As of March 2023, the World Solifugae Catalog accepts the following three species:

- Trichotoma brunnea Lawrence, 1968 — Namibia
- Trichotoma fusca (Roewer, 1941) — Namibia
- Trichotoma michaelseni (Kraepelin, 1914) — Namibia
