= Xerophaeus rubeus =

Knysna Mouse Ground Spider

Conservation status
- Least Concern (SANBI Red List)

Scientific classification
- Kingdom: Animalia
- Phylum: Arthropoda
- Subphylum: Chelicerata
- Class: Arachnida
- Order: Araneae
- Infraorder: Araneomorphae
- Family: Gnaphosidae
- Genus: Xerophaeus
- Species: X. rubeus

Binomial name
- Xerophaeus rubeus Tucker, 1923

Species of spider

Xerophaeus rubeus is a species of spider in the family Gnaphosidae. It occurs in southern Africa and is commonly known as the Knysna mouse ground spider.

== Distribution ==
Xerophaeus rubeus is recorded from Lesotho and South Africa. In South Africa, it is known from KwaZulu-Natal and the Western Cape.

== Habitat and ecology ==
The species inhabits multiple biomes including Fynbos, Grassland, and Savanna biomes at altitudes ranging from 45 to 2584 m above sea level. Xerophaeus rubeus are free-living ground dwellers and from the Sani Pass the species is abundant and has been sampled from 2100-2700 m above sea level.

== Conservation ==
Xerophaeus rubeus is listed as Least Concern by the South African National Biodiversity Institute due to its wide range. The species is protected in Swartberg Nature Reserve and there are no significant threats.

== Taxonomy ==
The species was originally described by Tucker in 1923 from Knysna. The species has not been revised and is known only from the female.
