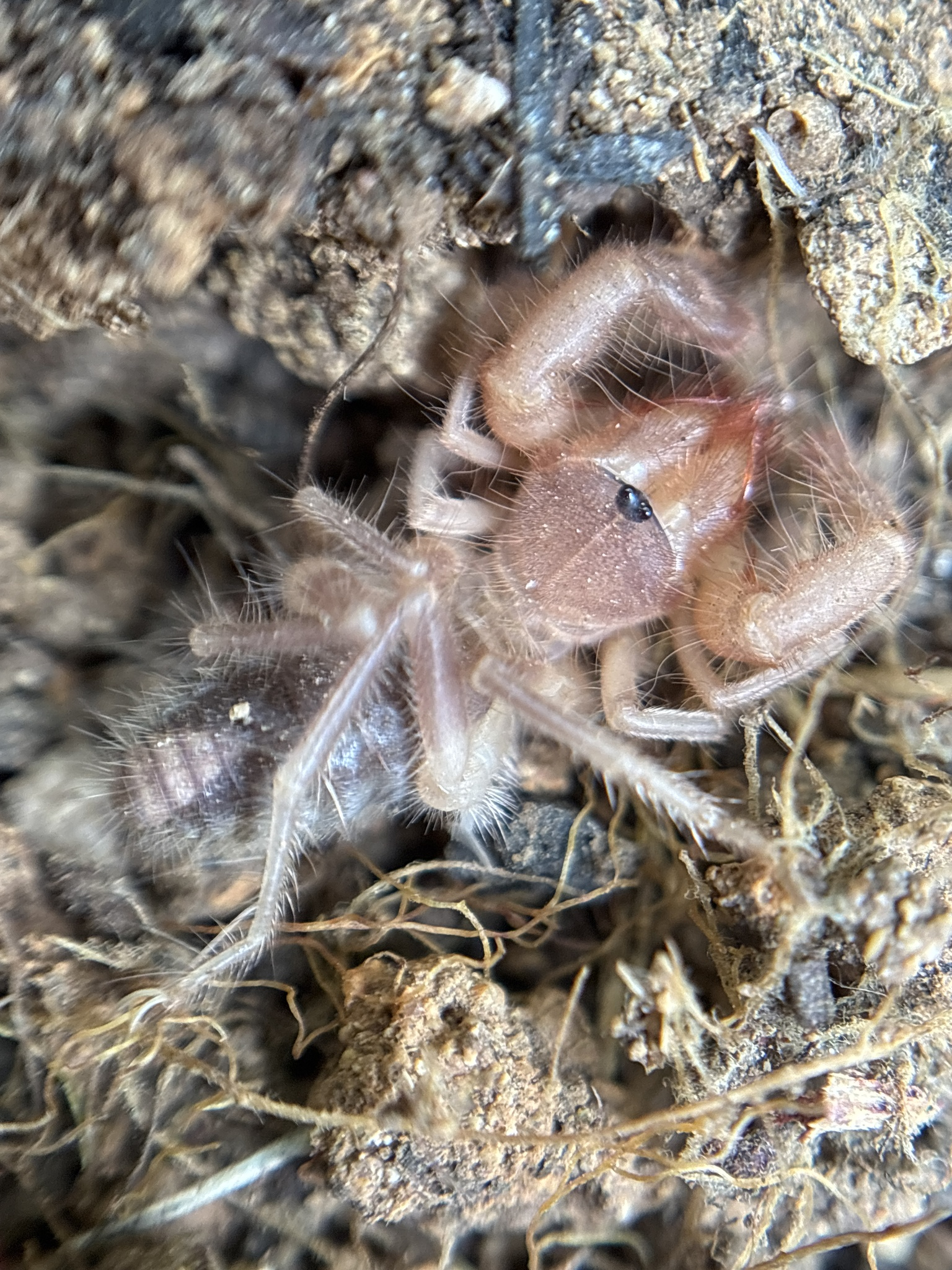
- Gylippus cyprioticus

Scientific classification
- Domain: Eukaryota
- Kingdom: Animalia
- Phylum: Arthropoda
- Subphylum: Chelicerata
- Class: Arachnida
- Order: Solifugae
- Suborder: Boreosolifugae
- Family: Gylippidae; Roewer, 1933

= Gylippidae =

Family of spider-like organisms

Gylippidae is a family of solifuges, first described by Carl Friedrich Roewer in 1933.

== Genera ==
As of October 2022, the World Solifugae Catalog accepts the following five genera:

- Acanthogylippus Birula, 1913
- Bdellophaga Wharton, 1981
- Gylippus Simon, 1879
- Lipophaga Purcell, 1903
- Trichotoma Lawrence, 1968
