= Xerophaeus matroosbergensis =

Matroosberg Mouse Ground Spider

Conservation status
- Least Concern (SANBI Red List)

Scientific classification
- Kingdom: Animalia
- Phylum: Arthropoda
- Subphylum: Chelicerata
- Class: Arachnida
- Order: Araneae
- Infraorder: Araneomorphae
- Family: Gnaphosidae
- Genus: Xerophaeus
- Species: X. matroosbergensis

Binomial name
- Xerophaeus matroosbergensis Tucker, 1923

Species of spider

Xerophaeus matroosbergensis is a species of spider in the family Gnaphosidae. It is endemic to South Africa and is commonly known as the Matroosberg mouse ground spider.

== Distribution ==
Xerophaeus matroosbergensis is recorded from two South African provinces: the Eastern Cape and Western Cape.

== Habitat and ecology ==
The species inhabits Fynbos and Nama Karoo biomes at altitudes ranging from 136 to 1287 m above sea level. Xerophaeus matroosbergensis are free-living ground dwellers.

== Conservation ==
Xerophaeus matroosbergensis is listed as Least Concern by the South African National Biodiversity Institute due to its wide range. The species is protected in Swartberg Nature Reserve and Goukamma Nature Reserve. There are no significant threats.

== Taxonomy ==
The species was originally described by Tucker in 1923 from Matroosberg Mountains near Ceres. The species has not been revised and is known only from the female.
