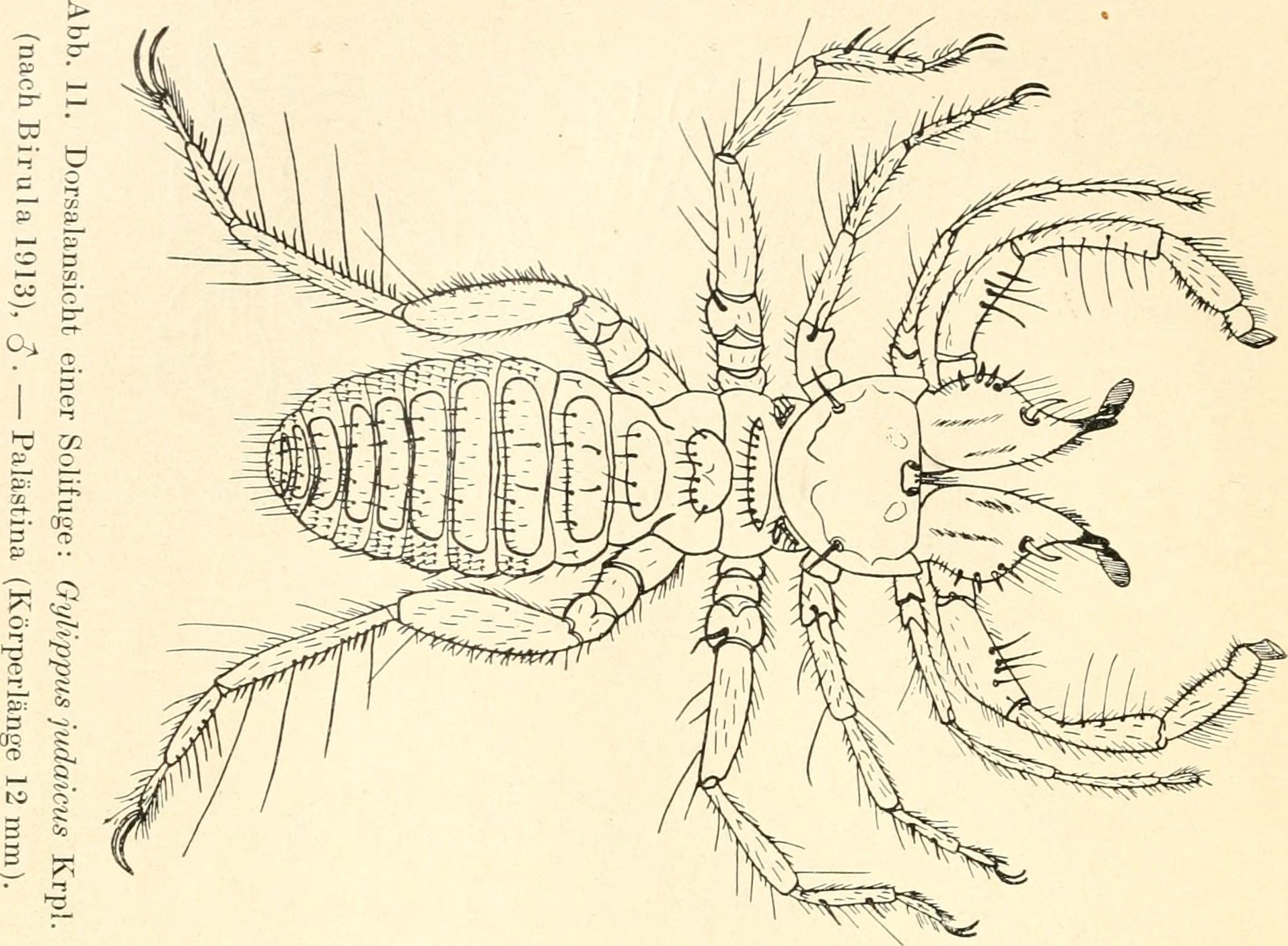

Scientific classification
- Domain: Eukaryota
- Kingdom: Animalia
- Phylum: Arthropoda
- Subphylum: Chelicerata
- Class: Arachnida
- Order: Solifugae
- Family: Gylippidae
- Genus: Acanthogylippus; Birula, 1913
- Species: A. judaicus

Binomial name
- Acanthogylippus judaicus (Kraepelin, 1899)

= Acanthogylippus =

Genus of camel spiders

Acanthogylippus is a monotypic genus of gylippid camel spiders, first described by Aleksei Birula in 1913. Its single species, Acanthogylippus judaicus is distributed in Israel.
