= Xerophaeus pallidus =

Scientific classification
- Kingdom: Animalia
- Phylum: Arthropoda
- Subphylum: Chelicerata
- Class: Arachnida
- Order: Araneae
- Infraorder: Araneomorphae
- Family: Gnaphosidae
- Genus: Xerophaeus
- Species: X. pallidus

Binomial name
- Xerophaeus pallidus Tucker, 1923

Species of spider

Xerophaeus pallidus is a species of spider in the family Gnaphosidae. It is endemic to South Africa.

== Distribution ==
Xerophaeus pallidus is endemic to KwaZulu-Natal.

== Habitat and ecology ==
The species inhabits Forest and Savanna biomes at altitudes ranging from 140 to 1220 m above sea level. Xerophaeus pallidus are free-living ground dwellers and have been sampled in pine plantations at Ngome.

== Conservation ==
Xerophaeus pallidus is listed as Data Deficient for taxonomic reasons. The species is protected in Ngome State Forest and Ndumo Game Reserve. More sampling is needed to collect females and to more accurately determine the species' range.

== Taxonomy ==
The species was originally described by Tucker in 1923 from Krantz Kop. The species has not been revised and is known only from the male.
