= Bdellophaga =

Scientific classification
- Domain: Eukaryota
- Kingdom: Animalia
- Phylum: Arthropoda
- Subphylum: Chelicerata
- Class: Arachnida
- Order: Solifugae
- Family: Gylippidae
- Genus: Bdellophaga; Wharton, 1981
- Species: B. angulata

Binomial name
- Bdellophaga angulata Wharton, 1981

Genus of camel spiders

Bdellophaga is a monotypic genus of gylippid camel spiders, first described by Robert Wharton in 1981. Its single species, Bdellophaga angulata is distributed in Namibia.
