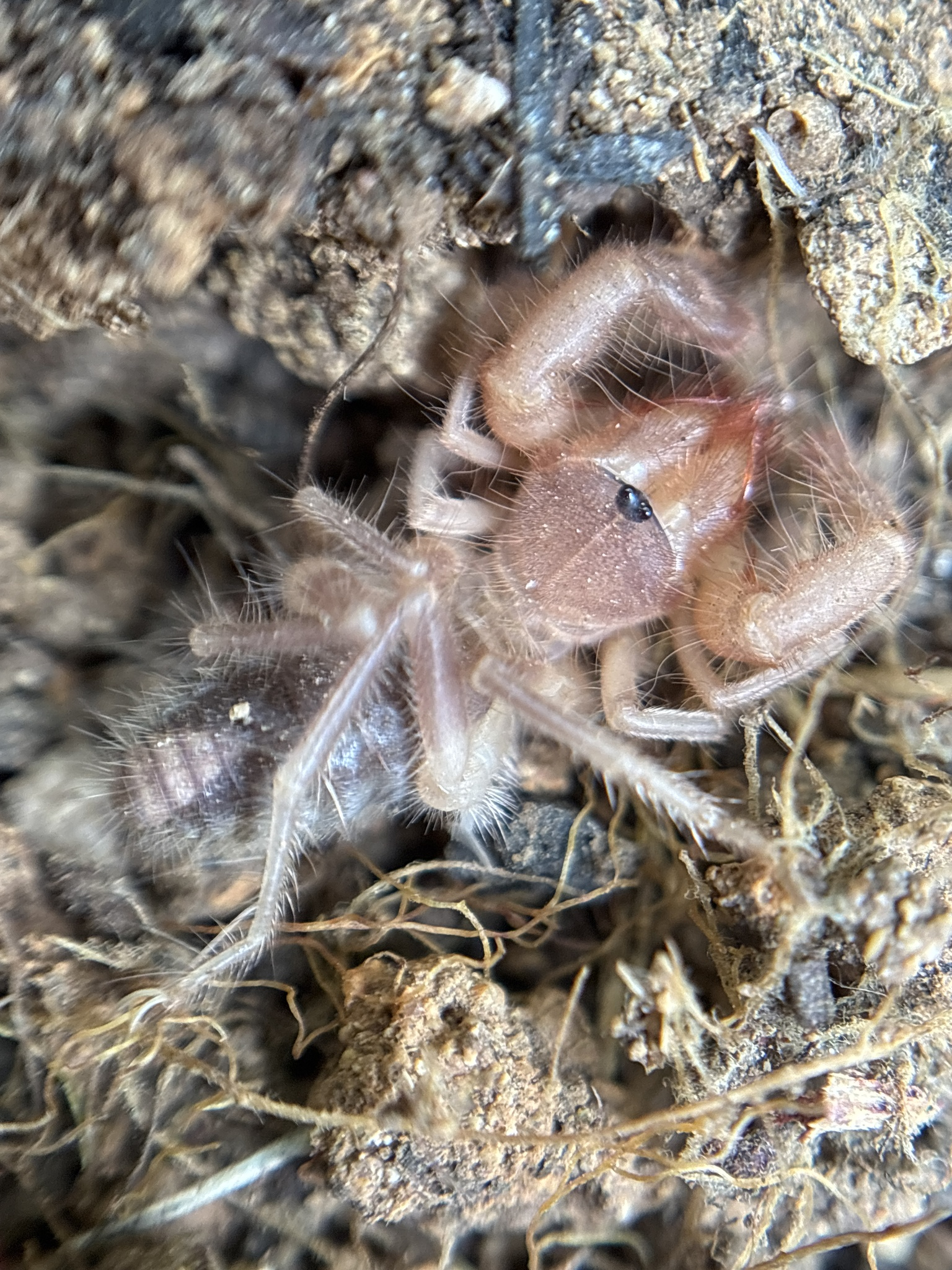
- Gylippus cyprioticus

Scientific classification
- Kingdom: Animalia
- Phylum: Arthropoda
- Subphylum: Chelicerata
- Class: Arachnida
- Order: Solifugae
- Family: Gylippidae
- Genus: Gylippus; Simon, 1879

Type species
- Gylippus syriacus (Simon, 1872)

Species
- 21, see text

= Gylippus (arachnid) =

Genus of camel spiders

Gylippus is a genus of gylippid camel spiders, first described by Eugène Simon in 1879.

== Species ==
As of April 2023, the World Solifugae Catalog accepts the following twenty-one species:

- Gylippus afghanensis Roewer, 1960 — Afghanistan
- Gylippus afghanus (Roewer, 1933) — Afghanistan
- Gylippus bayrami Erdek, 2015 — Turkey
- Gylippus bergi Birula, 1907 — Tajikistan
- Gylippus caucasicus Birula, 1907 — Armenia, Azerbaijan, Georgia, Turkey
- Gylippus cyprioticus Lawrence, 1953 — Cyprus
- Gylippus dsungaricus (Roewer, 1933) — China, Kazakhstan, Uzbekistan
- Gylippus erseni Koç & Erdek, 2019 — Turkey
- Gylippus ferganensis Birula, 1893 — Kazakhstan, Kyrgyzstan, Tajikistan, Uzbekistan
- Gylippus hakkaricus Erdek, 2019 — Turkey
- Gylippus krivokhatskyi Gromov, 1998 — Turkmenistan
- Gylippus lamelliger Birula, 1906 — Iran, Kazakhstan, Turkmenistan, Uzbekistan
- Gylippus monoceros Werner, 1905 — Turkey
- Gylippus oculatus (Roewer, 1960) — Afghanistan
- Gylippus pectinifer Birula, 1906 — Tajikistan
- Gylippus quaestiunculoides Birula, 1907 — Iran
- Gylippus quaestiunculus Karsch, 1880 — Turkey
- Gylippus shulowi Turk, 1948 — Israel
- Gylippus spinimanus Birula, 1905 — Iran
- Gylippus syriacus (Simon, 1872) — Cyprus, Iraq, Israel, Syria, Turkey
- Gylippus yerohami Levy & Shulov, 1964 — Israel
