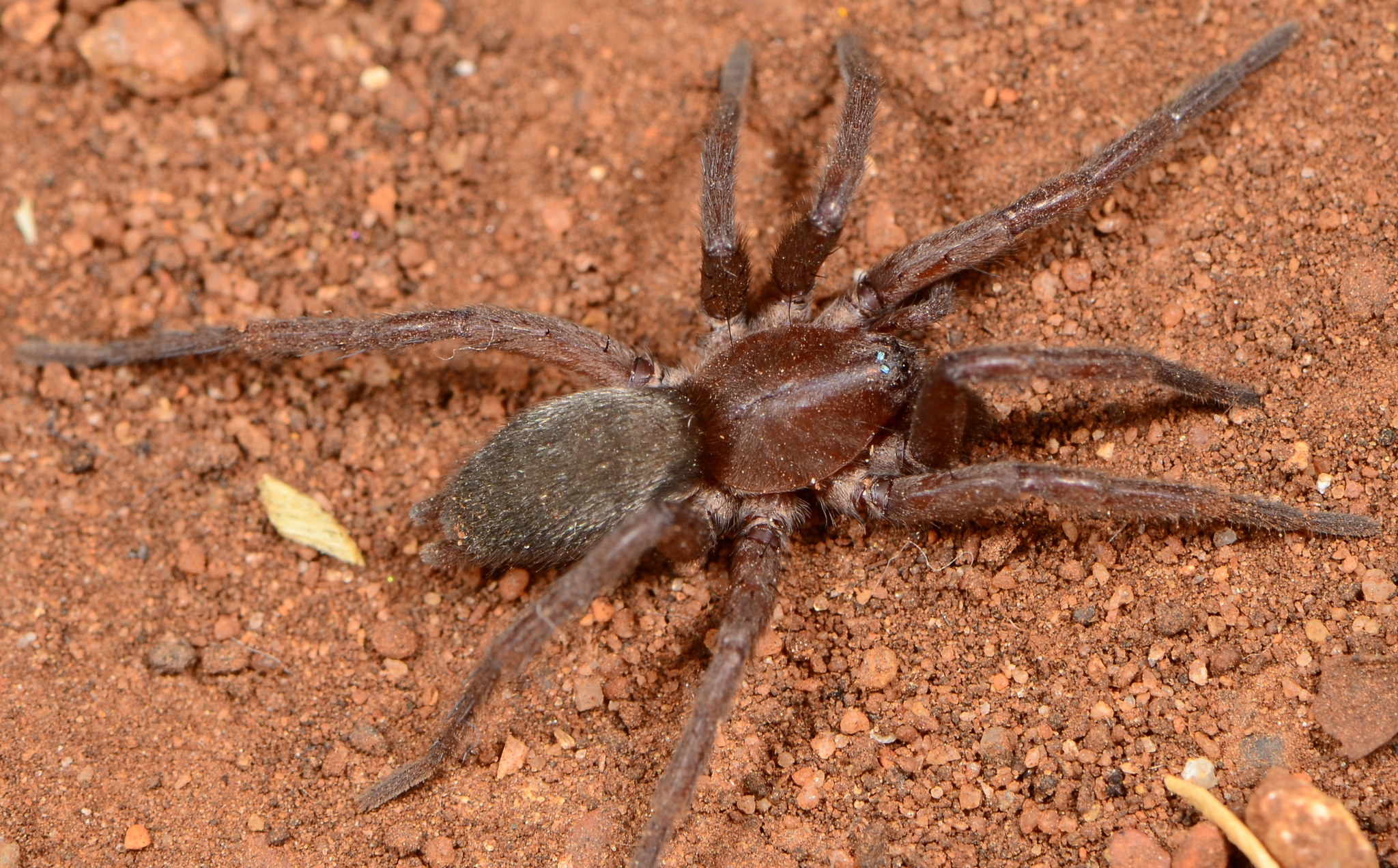
- female
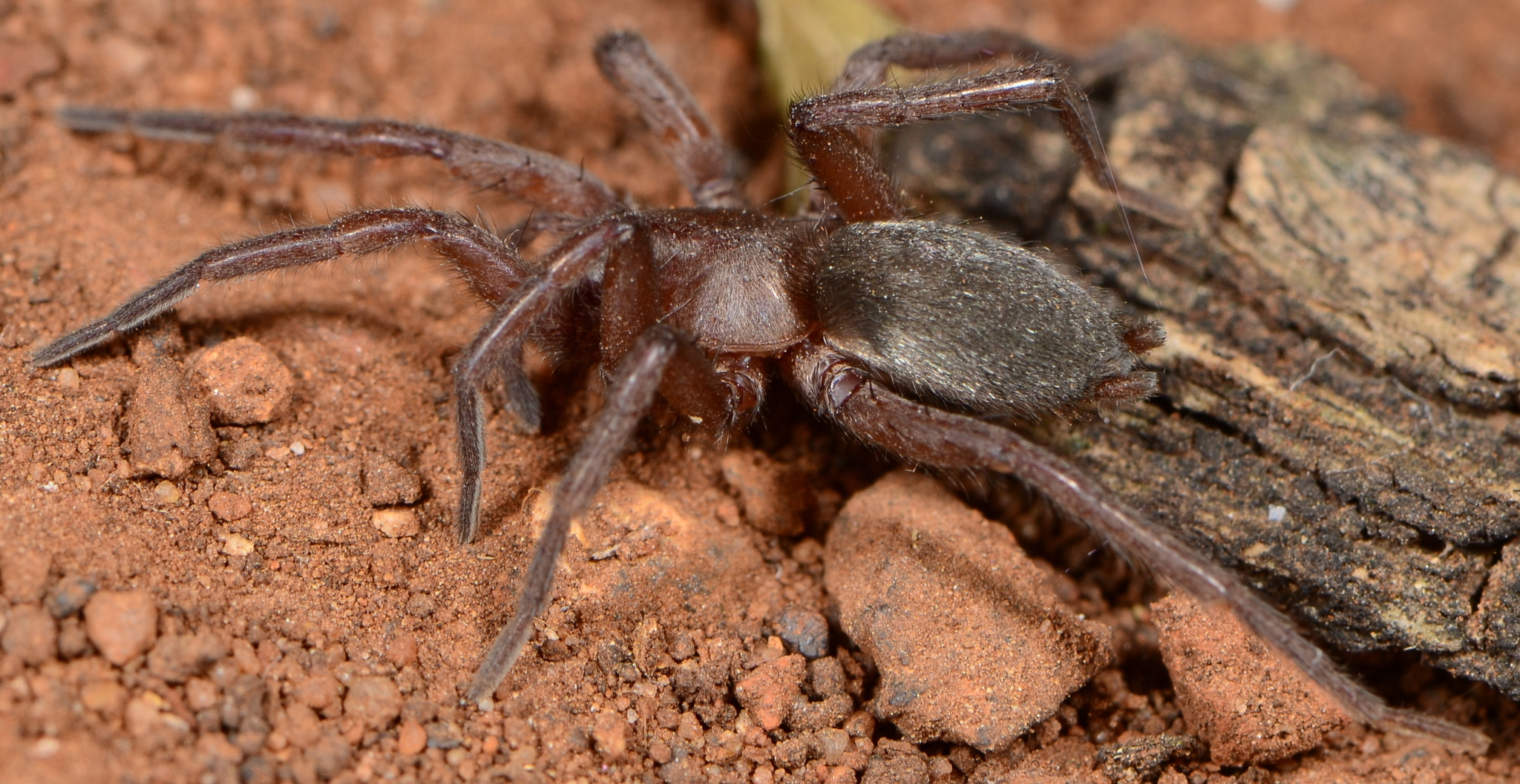
- female

Scientific classification
- Kingdom: Animalia
- Phylum: Arthropoda
- Subphylum: Chelicerata
- Class: Arachnida
- Order: Araneae
- Infraorder: Araneomorphae
- Family: Gnaphosidae
- Genus: Xerophaeus
- Species: X. bicavus

Binomial name
- Xerophaeus bicavus Tucker, 1923

= Xerophaeus bicavus =

Acornhoek Mouse Ground Spider

Species of spider

Xerophaeus bicavus is a species of spider in the family Gnaphosidae. It is endemic to South Africa and is commonly known as the Acornhoek mouse ground spider.

== Distribution ==
Xerophaeus bicavus is recorded from the South African provinces Eastern Cape, Gauteng, KwaZulu-Natal, Limpopo, Mpumalanga, Northern Cape, North West, and Western Cape.

== Habitat and ecology ==
The species inhabits multiple biomes including Forest, Grassland, Nama Karoo, and Savanna biomes at altitudes ranging from 0 to 1922 m above sea level. Xerophaeus bicavus are free-living ground dwellers.

== Conservation ==
Xerophaeus bicavus is listed as Least Concern by the South African National Biodiversity Institute due to its wide distribution. The species is protected in eight protected areas and there are no significant threats.

== Taxonomy ==
The species was originally described by Tucker in 1923 from Acornhoek, Limpopo. It has not been revised but is known from both sexes.
