= Xerophaeus silvaticus =

Eastern Cape Mouse Ground Spider

Conservation status
- Least Concern (SANBI Red List)

Scientific classification
- Kingdom: Animalia
- Phylum: Arthropoda
- Subphylum: Chelicerata
- Class: Arachnida
- Order: Araneae
- Infraorder: Araneomorphae
- Family: Gnaphosidae
- Genus: Xerophaeus
- Species: X. silvaticus

Binomial name
- Xerophaeus silvaticus Tucker, 1923

Species of spider

Xerophaeus silvaticus is a species of spider in the family Gnaphosidae. It is endemic to South Africa and is commonly known as the Eastern Cape mouse ground spider.

== Distribution ==
Xerophaeus silvaticus is endemic to the Eastern Cape.

== Habitat and ecology ==
The species inhabits the Thicket biome at altitudes ranging from 81 to 199 m above sea level. Xerophaeus silvaticus are free-living ground dwellers.

== Conservation ==
Xerophaeus silvaticus is listed as Least Concern by the South African National Biodiversity Institute. The species is protected in Cwebe Nature Reserve and Silaka Nature Reserve. There are no significant threats, though more sampling is needed to collect males.

== Taxonomy ==
The species was originally described by Tucker in 1923 from Manubi Forest in the Eastern Cape. The species has not been revised and is known only from the female.
