= Xerophaeus biplagiatus =

East African Mouse Ground Spider

Conservation status
- Least Concern (SANBI Red List)

Scientific classification
- Kingdom: Animalia
- Phylum: Arthropoda
- Subphylum: Chelicerata
- Class: Arachnida
- Order: Araneae
- Infraorder: Araneomorphae
- Family: Gnaphosidae
- Genus: Xerophaeus
- Species: X. biplagiatus

Binomial name
- Xerophaeus biplagiatus Tullgren, 1910

Species of spider

Xerophaeus biplagiatus is a species of spider in the family Gnaphosidae. It occurs in Africa and is commonly known as the East African mouse ground spider.

== Distribution ==
Xerophaeus biplagiatus is recorded from East Africa and South Africa. In South Africa, it is known only from Gauteng.

== Habitat and ecology ==
The species inhabits the Grassland and Savanna biomes at altitudes ranging from 1303 to 1444 m above sea level. Xerophaeus biplagiatus are free-living ground dwellers.

== Conservation ==
Xerophaeus biplagiatus is listed as Least Concern by the South African National Biodiversity Institute due to its wide range in Africa. There are no significant threats to the species, though more sampling is needed to collect males.

== Taxonomy ==
The species was originally described by Tullgren in 1910 from East Africa. The species has not been revised and is known only from the female.
