= Smut (band) =

American indie rock group

Smut is an American indie rock band from Cincinnati, Ohio now based in Chicago, Illinois.

== History ==
Smut began in 2014 with the release of their debut EP Purse. In 2016, Smut released their second EP titled Sam-Soon. In 2017, the band released their debut album, End of Sam-Soon. In 2020, Smut released their third EP titled Power Fantasy.

In January 2020, Smut contributed to Bernie Speaks With the Community, a benefit compilation organized by indie band Strange Ranger to support Bernie Sanders's 2020 presidential campaign. They contributed a demo of their song "Fan Age."

In 2022, Smut announced plans to release their second full-length album with Bayonet Records. The album, How the Light Felt, was released on November 11, 2022. The album received positive reviews. In 2025, Smut released their third full-length album titled Tomorrow Comes Crashing.
