= William Frederick Purcell =

(1866–1919) English-born South African araneologist

- Born: 18 September 1866; London, England
- Died: 3 October 1919 (aged 53); Cape Town, Union of South Africa
- Education: Friedrich-Wilhelms-Universitaet
- Known for: araneology
- Spouse: Anna Cambier Faure (m. 1897)
- Children: Frederick Walter Faure Purcell; Olive Margaretha Deneys Purcell; William Frederick Hertzog Purcell
- Scientific career
- Fields: zoology, araneology
- Workplaces: South African Museum
- Thesis: Ueber den Bau der Phalangidenaugen (On the structure of the eyes in the Phalangida) (1895)

William Frederick Purcell FRSSAf (18 September 1866 - 3 October 1919) was an English-born South African arachnologist and zoologist. He is regarded as being the founder of modern araneology in South Africa.

== Early life and education ==
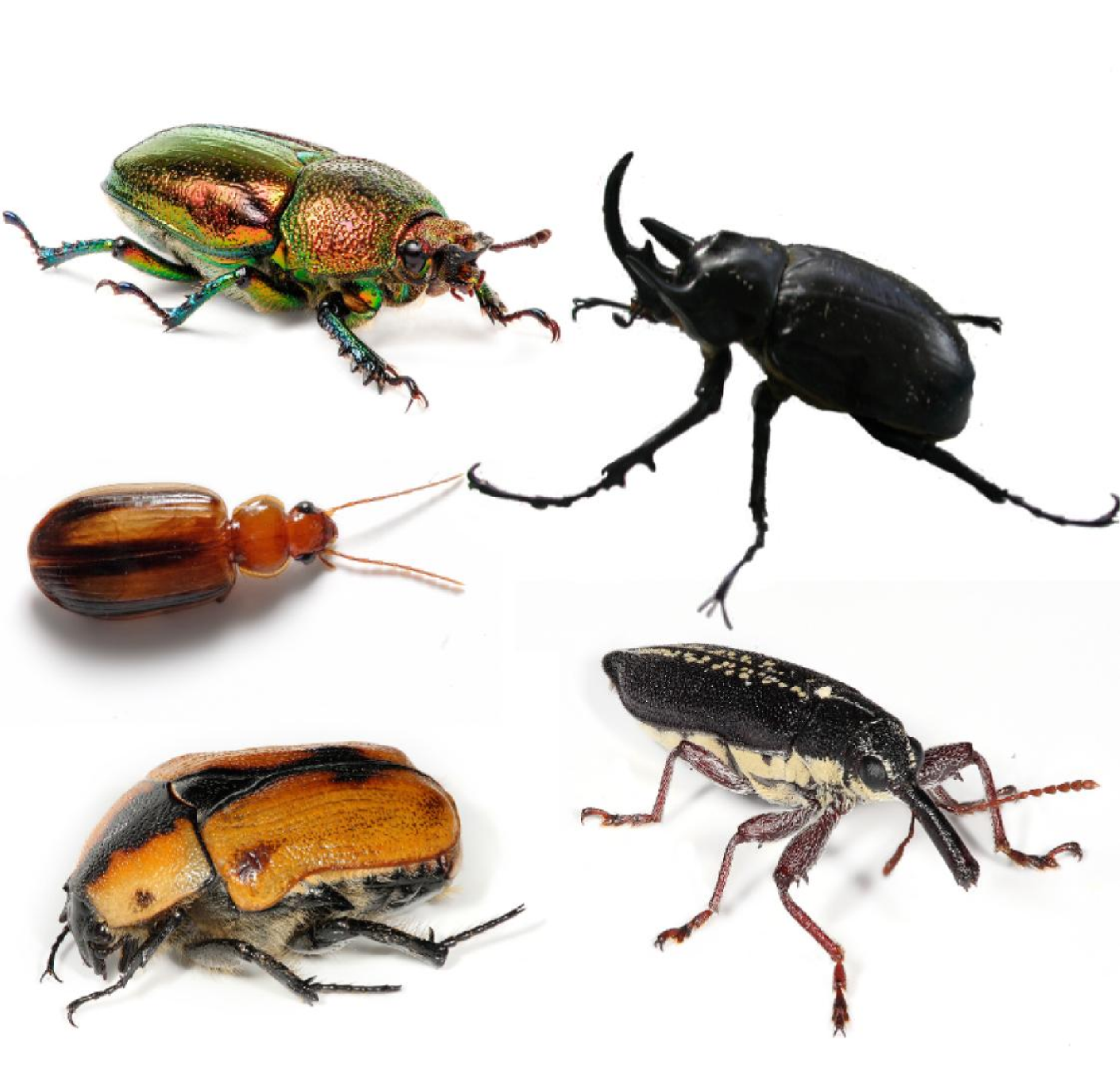
Collection of coleoptera (beetles)

Purcell was born in London, England, to Dr. Walter P.J. Purcell of Waterford, Ireland, and his wife Sophia W.J. Hertzog of Cape Town. In 1868 the family moved to Cape Colony and settled in Cape Town. He spent most of his childhood on the farm Bergvliet, which was owned by his uncle W.F. Hertzog.

From 1881, Purcell studied at South African College, Cape Town, matriculated through the University of the Cape of Good Hope (UCGH) in 1884 and received a BA (with Honours) in mathematics and natural science in 1887 from UCGH. In 1885 and 1887 he provided the South African Museum with samples of coleoptera obtained at Bergvliet and Prieska.

Purcell continued his education in Germany with a focus on the internal structure of arachnids. In 1894 Friedrich-Wilhelms-Universitaet awarded him the degree DPhil with a thesis entitled "Ueber den Bau der Phalangidenaugen" ("On the structure of the eyes in the Phalangida").

Purcell returned to South Africa in 1895 and donated his collections of South African Coleoptera (Families Cicindelidae and Carabidae), and European Coleoptera and Rhynchota, to the South African Museum.

== Career ==
Purcell applied for the position of director of the South African Museum in 1895 following the resignation of Roland Trimen but did not get the post. He took up an appointment as First Assistant at the South African Museum and keeper of the terrestrial invertebrates collection (excluding insects) in 1896, under its new Director, W.L. Sclater. He kept this position until 1905 when he retired owing to poor health.

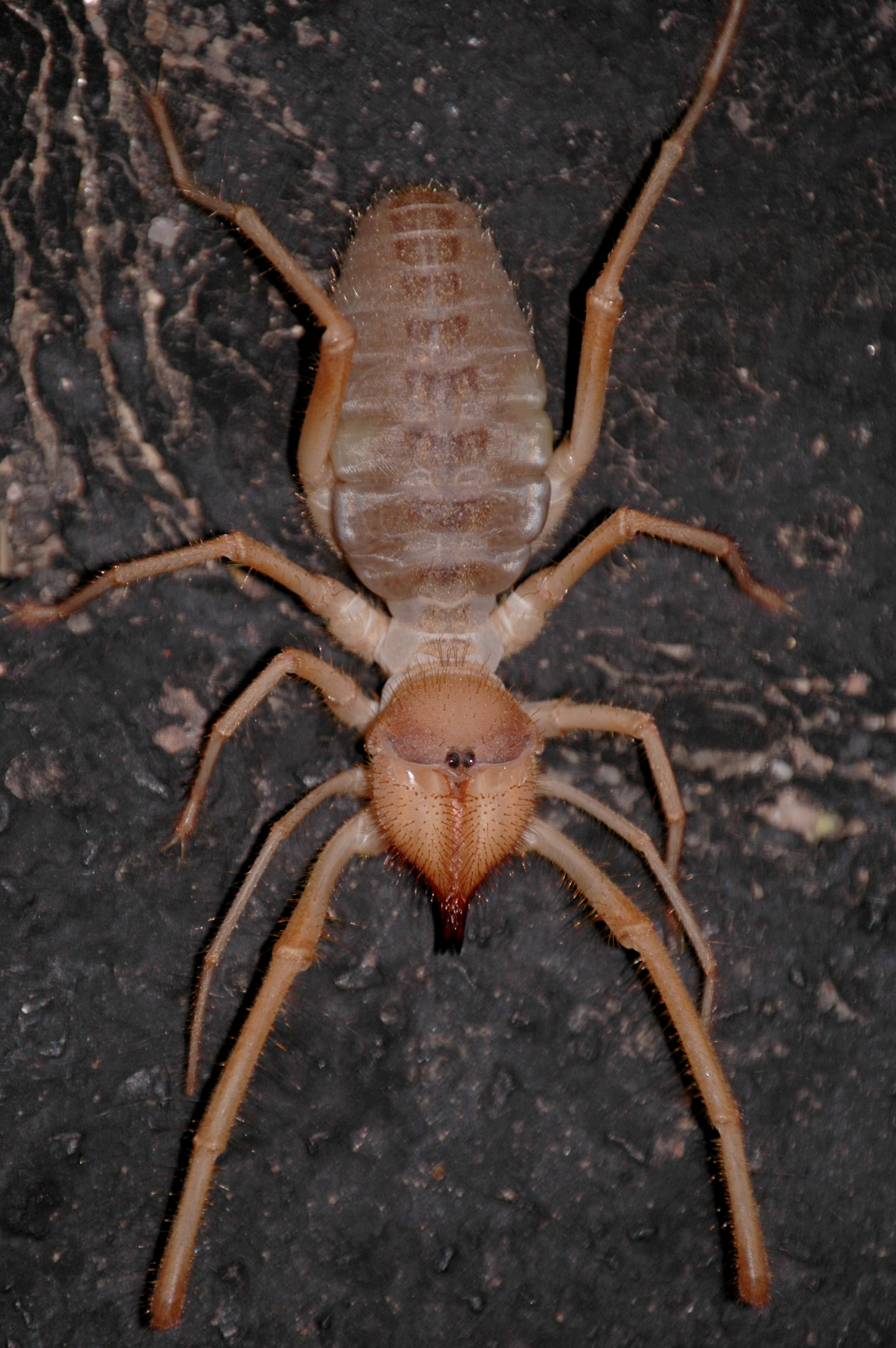
Solifugid

He initiated the systematic study of South African scorpions, including the description of many new species. In 1899 he provided the first description of local Solifugae (Camel spider or Sun spider) and collected a large number of specimens.

He was the first South African zoologist to start a systematic study of spiders, devising keys and providing full descriptions of species. Up to that time Arthur Stanley Hirst (1883–1930), Pickard-Cambridge and R. I. Pocock of the British Museum had occasionally named spiders sent to them from South African sources. Pocock especially was supplied with unknown specimens from Natal and Rhodesia, many coming from Selmar Schonland, the botany professor at Rhodes University.

South Africa is a fertile hunting ground for the study of Mygalomorphae or 4-lunged spiders, and both Purcell and R. W. E. Tucker who succeeded him, were drawn to this group, as was J. Hewitt. William and Anna Purcell are an example of husband and wife collaboration in arachnology, the other well-known couple being George and Elizabeth Peckham from the States who worked on South African Salticidae.

Purcell was the first zoologist in Africa to make a thorough study of Peripatus. He continued the work of H.N. Moseley, A. Sedgwick and others and described one new genus and three new species.

== Eponyms ==
- In 1964, the genus of spiders Purcelliana was named after him by J.A.L. Cooke.
- A species of South African gecko, Pachydactylus purcelli, is named after him.
- Purcell was commemorated in the names of the molluscs Euonyma purcelli and Apera purcelli but these have subsequently been renamed.

The standard author abbreviation Purcell is used to indicate this individual as the author when citing a zoological name.

== Memberships ==
- 1895 Member of the South African Philosophical Society
- 1905 Member of the British Association for the Advancement of Science
- 1908 Fellow of the Royal Society of South Africa
- 1910 Member of the South African Association for the Advancement of Science
- 1917 Council member of the Royal Society of South Africa
- Member of the Zoological Society of London
- 1900-1903 Examiner in zoology for the University of the Cape of Good Hope

== Selected publications ==
Purcell published mainly in Annals of the South African Museum and the Transactions of the South African Philosophical Society. Some of his publications include:

- 1902 "New South African trap-door spiders of the family Ctenizidae in the collection of the South African Museum" Trans. S. Afric. phil. Soc. 11
- 1902 "On the South African Theraphosidae or "Baviaan" spiders, in the collection of the South African Museum." Trans. S. Afric. Mus. 11 p.319-347
- 1903 "New South African spiders of the families Migidae, Ctenizidae, Barychelidae Dipluridae, and Lycosidae" Annals of the South African Museum 3 p. 69-142
- 1904 "Descriptions of new genera and species of South African spiders" Trans. S. Afric. phil. Soc. 15 p. 115-173

== Private life ==
On 24 March 1897, Purcell married Anna Cambier Faure, who was a close South African friend of Olive Schreiner. The Purcell's had three children, Frederick Walter Faure Purcell, Olive Margaretha Deneys Purcell and William Frederick Hertzog Purcell. Anna Purcell was a cousin of Barry Hertzog, and her sister Joey married a Smuts. During the South African War (1899–1902) Anna was involved in relief work for Boer women and children. She later became involved in the Cape Women’s Enfranchisement League, of which Schreiner was a high-profile member.

The Purcells lived on a country estate on the outskirts of Cape Town called Bergvliet. The farm was originally part of W.A. van der Stel's farm Groot Constantia.

In 1905 Purcell retired from the South African Museum owing to ill health, although he continued some of his work as honorary keeper at the South African Museum up until 1908. He retired to Bergvliet where he managed the farm on behalf of his family until his death in 1919. He continued to collect specimens of arachnids and insects but his main activity was to create an Herbarium of the farm's natural vegetation. The herbarium is preserved in the Compton Herbarium at the National Botanical Institute in Cape Town.

Purcell had a strong interest in Cape history, art and antiques and, with his and his wife's acquaintance with influential members of South African society, influenced the South African Museum in the purchase of the Koopmans-de Wet House, its conversion into a museum and his appointment as honorary curator.
