= E. affinis =

E. affinis may refer to:

- Emberiza affinis, the brown-rumped bunting, a bird species found in Africa
- Eleutherodactylus affinis, a frog species endemic to Colombia
- Elops affinis, the Pacific tenpounder or Pacific ladyfish, a fish species
- Empidonax affinis, the pine flycatcher, a bird species found in Mexico and Guatemala
- Eremobates affinis, an arachnid species
- Euphonia affinis, the scrub euphonia, a bird species found in Belize, Costa Rica, El Salvador, Guatemala, Honduras, Mexico and Nicaragua
- Euthynnus affinis, the kawakawa or false albacore, a fish species
