= Eremothera =

Eremothera is the scientific name of two genera of organisms and may refer to:

- Eremothera (arachnid), a genus of wind scorpions in the family Eremobatidae
- Eremothera (plant), a genus of plants in the family Onagraceae
