= Eremochelis oregonensis =

Scientific classification
- Domain: Eukaryota
- Kingdom: Animalia
- Phylum: Arthropoda
- Subphylum: Chelicerata
- Class: Arachnida
- Order: Solifugae
- Family: Eremobatidae
- Genus: Eremochelis
- Species: E. oregonensis

Binomial name
- Eremochelis oregonensis Brookhart & Cushing, 2005

Species of spider-like animal

Eremochelis oregonensis is a species of windscorpion in the family Eremobatidae.
