= Eremochelis bilobatus =

Scientific classification
- Domain: Eukaryota
- Kingdom: Animalia
- Phylum: Arthropoda
- Subphylum: Chelicerata
- Class: Arachnida
- Order: Solifugae
- Family: Eremobatidae
- Genus: Eremochelis
- Species: E. bilobatus

Binomial name
- Eremochelis bilobatus (Muma, 1951)

Species of spider-like animal

Eremochelis bilobatus is a species of windscorpion in the family Eremobatidae.
