= Eremobates pallidus =

Scientific classification
- Domain: Eukaryota
- Kingdom: Animalia
- Phylum: Arthropoda
- Subphylum: Chelicerata
- Class: Arachnida
- Order: Solifugae
- Family: Eremobatidae
- Genus: Eremobates
- Species: E. pallidus

Binomial name
- Eremobates pallidus Muma & Brookhart, 1988

Species of spider-like animal

Eremobates pallidus is a species of windscorpion in the family Eremobatidae.
