= Chanbria rectus =

Scientific classification
- Domain: Eukaryota
- Kingdom: Animalia
- Phylum: Arthropoda
- Subphylum: Chelicerata
- Class: Arachnida
- Order: Solifugae
- Family: Eremobatidae
- Genus: Chanbria
- Species: C. rectus

Binomial name
- Chanbria rectus Muma, 1962

Species of spider-like animal

Chanbria rectus is a species of windscorpion in the family Eremobatidae.
