= Eremothera sculpturata =

Scientific classification
- Domain: Eukaryota
- Kingdom: Animalia
- Phylum: Arthropoda
- Subphylum: Chelicerata
- Class: Arachnida
- Order: Solifugae
- Family: Eremobatidae
- Genus: Eremothera
- Species: E. sculpturata

Binomial name
- Eremothera sculpturata Muma, 1951

Species of spider-like animal

Eremothera sculpturata is a species of windscorpion in the family Eremobatidae.
