= Hemerotrecha sevilleta =

Scientific classification
- Domain: Eukaryota
- Kingdom: Animalia
- Phylum: Arthropoda
- Subphylum: Chelicerata
- Class: Arachnida
- Order: Solifugae
- Family: Eremobatidae
- Genus: Hemerotrecha
- Species: H. sevilleta

Binomial name
- Hemerotrecha sevilleta Brookhart & Cushing, 2002

Species of spider-like animal

Hemerotrecha sevilleta is a species of windscorpion in the family Eremobatidae.
