= Chanbria =

Scientific classification
- Domain: Eukaryota
- Kingdom: Animalia
- Phylum: Arthropoda
- Subphylum: Chelicerata
- Class: Arachnida
- Order: Solifugae
- Family: Eremobatidae
- Subfamily: Therobatinae
- Genus: Chanbria; Muma, 1951

Type species
- Chanbria regalis Muma, 1951

Species
- C. rectus Muma, 1962; C. regalis Muma, 1951; C. serpentinus Muma, 1951; C. tehachapianus Muma, 1962

Genus of spider-like animals

Chanbria is a genus of camel spiders. It consists of four species found in the Sonoran Desert in Mexico and the southwestern United States.

== Taxonomy ==
American arachnologist Martin Hammond Muma created this genus in 1951. He wrote the generic name, Chanbria, was an "arbitrary combination of letters based on an anagram of the name Branch", referring to Jefferson H. Branch; Branch had collected the holotype for the type species. Muma did not explicitly designate a gender, but Australian arachnologist Mark S. Harvey notes that Muma used masculine endings for species in this genus.

Muma's 1951 circumscription included two newly described species, the type species C. regalis and C. serpentinus. In 1962, he described two additional species: C. rectus and C. tehachapianus.

In 1970, Muma grouped the four Chanbria species into two species groups: the regalis-group (C. rectus, C. regalis, and C. tehachapianus), and the serpentinus-group (C. serpentinus). Subsequent arachnologists have not made use of these species groups in their taxonomy.

A nomen nudum, C. coachella, was listed by American entomologists Gary Allan Polis and Sharon J. McCormick in 1986 as prey of the scorpion Paruroctonus mesaensis, but this species was not formally described.

When Muma created the genus Chanbria, he placed it in the subfamily Therobatinae, which he also circumscribed in the same 1951 paper. In an unpublished manuscript he wrote shortly before he died, Muma proposed a new subfamily, Hemerotrechinae, characterized by two tarsal claws on leg I and males which lack a mesal groove on their fixed cheliceral finger. Muma placed Chanbria and most Hemerotrecha species in this subfamily. Subsequent arachnologists have placed Chanbria in Therobatinae, although American arachnologist Paula E. Cushing and colleagues have argued Therobatinae is in need of taxonomic revision as the subfamily is polyphyletic.

An analysis by American arachnologist Paula E. Cushing and colleagues suggests the most recent common ancestor for Chanbria was in the Late Miocene. Their BEAST analysis suggested the genus was monophyletic.

== Description and biology ==
Adults of Chanbria are 20–30 mm (0.8–1.2 in) long. They are slender and have long legs.

Chanbria spp. have fan-shaped sense organs known as malleoli. Adults have five on the ventral side of each hind leg: two on its coxa, two on its proximal trochanter, and one on its distal trochanter. Dendrites of 72,000 sensory neurons are on each malleolus.

Cushing and colleagues have suggested that juveniles of Chanbria locate prey beneath the sand using a combination of tactile and chemical cues; they use their pedipalps to feel for prey and use their malleoli as chemoreceptors to sniff them out. Juveniles use their second pair of legs, as well as possibly their first pair of legs or their chelicerae, to dig a shallow hole in the sand to look for prey, such as hemipteran nymphs or aphids. Juveniles also exhibit avoidance behavior, running away when they encounter similarly sized arthropods.

== Species ==
Four recognized species are placed in this genus.

The holotype of C. rectus Muma, 1962 was collected in Barstow, California; it is found in the Sonoran Desert in southern California.

The type locality for C. regalis Muma, 1951 is Twentynine Palms, California. It is also found in southern California in the Sonoran Desert, as well as in Arizona. The specific name, regalis means "regal".

C. serpentinus Muma, 1951 is found in the Sonoran Desert in Arizona. Its type locality is Tucson, Arizona. The specific name, serpentinus, "serpentine", refers to the shape of its fixed finger.

C. tehachapianus Muma, 1962 is found in Mexico and California. Its type locality is the Tehachapi Mountains in Kern County, California; another specimen was collected in Sonora, Mexico, 20 miles (32 km) southeast of San Luis Río Colorado.
