= Chanbria regalis =

Scientific classification
- Domain: Eukaryota
- Kingdom: Animalia
- Phylum: Arthropoda
- Subphylum: Chelicerata
- Class: Arachnida
- Order: Solifugae
- Family: Eremobatidae
- Genus: Chanbria
- Species: C. regalis

Binomial name
- Chanbria regalis Muma, 1951

Species of spider-like animal

Chanbria regalis is a species of wind scorpion in the family Eremobatidae.
