= Eremothera drachmani =

Scientific classification
- Domain: Eukaryota
- Kingdom: Animalia
- Phylum: Arthropoda
- Subphylum: Chelicerata
- Class: Arachnida
- Order: Solifugae
- Family: Eremobatidae
- Genus: Eremothera
- Species: E. drachmani

Binomial name
- Eremothera drachmani Muma, 1986

Species of spider-like animal

Eremothera drachmani is a species of windscorpion in the family Eremobatidae.
