= Eremobates polhemusi =

Scientific classification
- Domain: Eukaryota
- Kingdom: Animalia
- Phylum: Arthropoda
- Subphylum: Chelicerata
- Class: Arachnida
- Order: Solifugae
- Family: Eremobatidae
- Genus: Eremobates
- Species: E. polhemusi

Binomial name
- Eremobates polhemusi Muma & Brookhart, 1988

Species of spider-like animal

Eremobates polhemusi is a species of Solifugae in the family Eremobatidae. It is endemic to Utah, United States.
