= Eremobates pallipes =

Scientific classification
- Domain: Eukaryota
- Kingdom: Animalia
- Phylum: Arthropoda
- Subphylum: Chelicerata
- Class: Arachnida
- Order: Solifugae
- Family: Eremobatidae
- Genus: Eremobates
- Species: E. pallipes

Binomial name
- Eremobates pallipes (Say, 1823)

Species of spider-like animal

Eremobates pallipes, known as the pale windscorpion or pale sun spider, is a species of windscorpion in the family Eremobatidae. It is known to occur in western North America, from Arizona to Canada.
