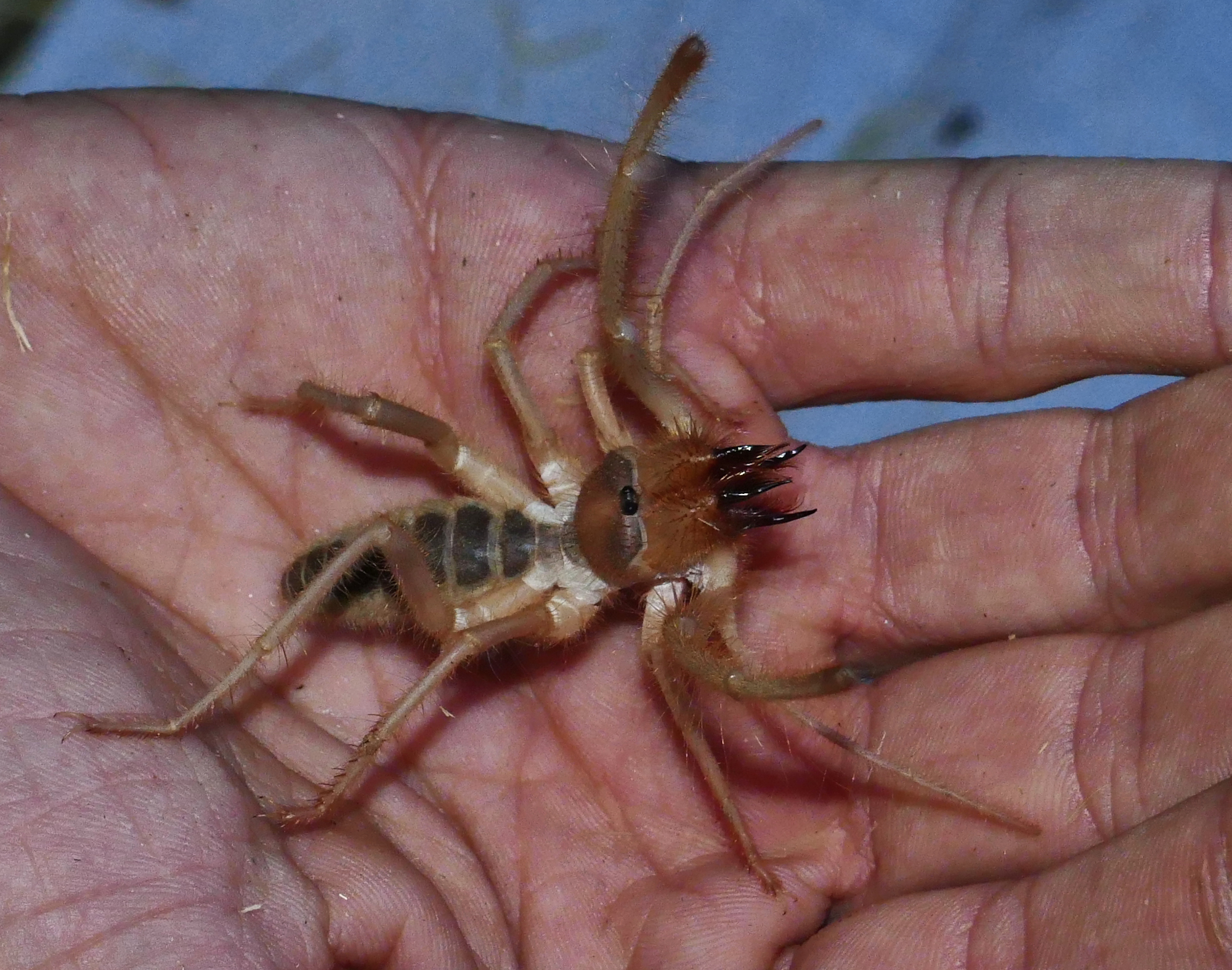

Scientific classification
- Domain: Eukaryota
- Kingdom: Animalia
- Phylum: Arthropoda
- Subphylum: Chelicerata
- Class: Arachnida
- Order: Solifugae
- Family: Eremobatidae
- Genus: Eremocosta
- Species: E. striata

Binomial name
- Eremocosta striata (Putnam, 1883)

= Eremocosta striata =

Species of spider-like animal

Eremocosta striata is a species of windscorpion in the family Eremobatidae.
