= Horribates bantai =

Scientific classification
- Domain: Eukaryota
- Kingdom: Animalia
- Phylum: Arthropoda
- Subphylum: Chelicerata
- Class: Arachnida
- Order: Solifugae
- Family: Eremobatidae
- Genus: Horribates
- Species: H. bantai

Binomial name
- Horribates bantai Muma, 1989

Species of spider-like animal

Horribates bantai is a species of windscorpion in the family Eremobatidae.
