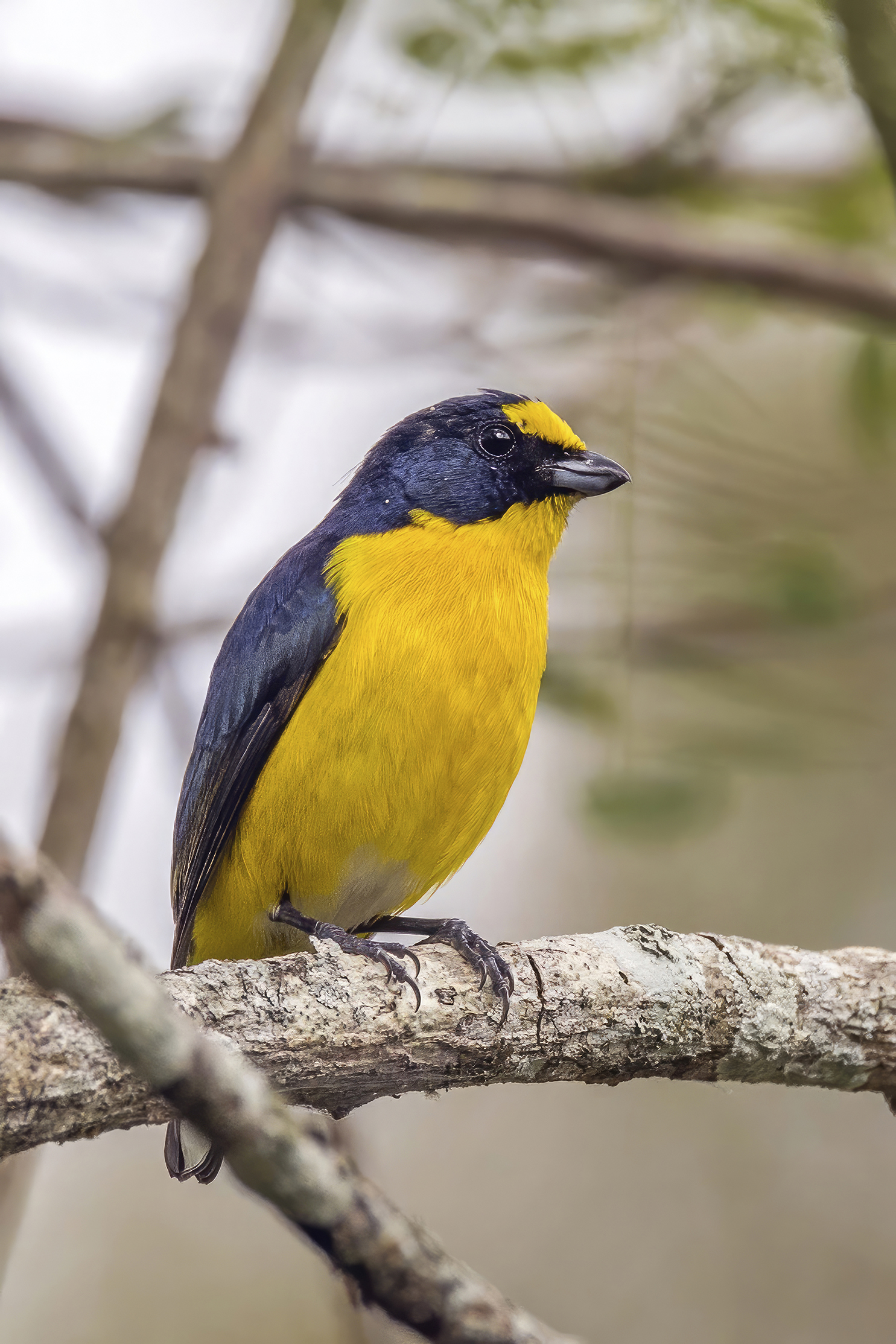
- Male E. h. hirundinacea, Honduras

Conservation status
- Least Concern (IUCN 3.1)

Scientific classification
- Kingdom: Animalia
- Phylum: Chordata
- Class: Aves
- Order: Passeriformes
- Family: Fringillidae
- Subfamily: Euphoniinae
- Genus: Euphonia
- Species: E. hirundinacea

Binomial name
- Euphonia hirundinacea Bonaparte, 1838
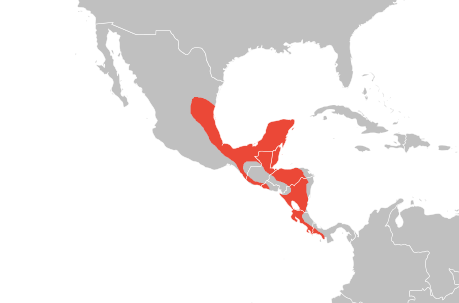
- Distribution of the yellow-throated euphonia (red)

Synonyms
- Bonaparte's Euphonia; Tanagra lauta

= Yellow-throated euphonia =

Species of songbird

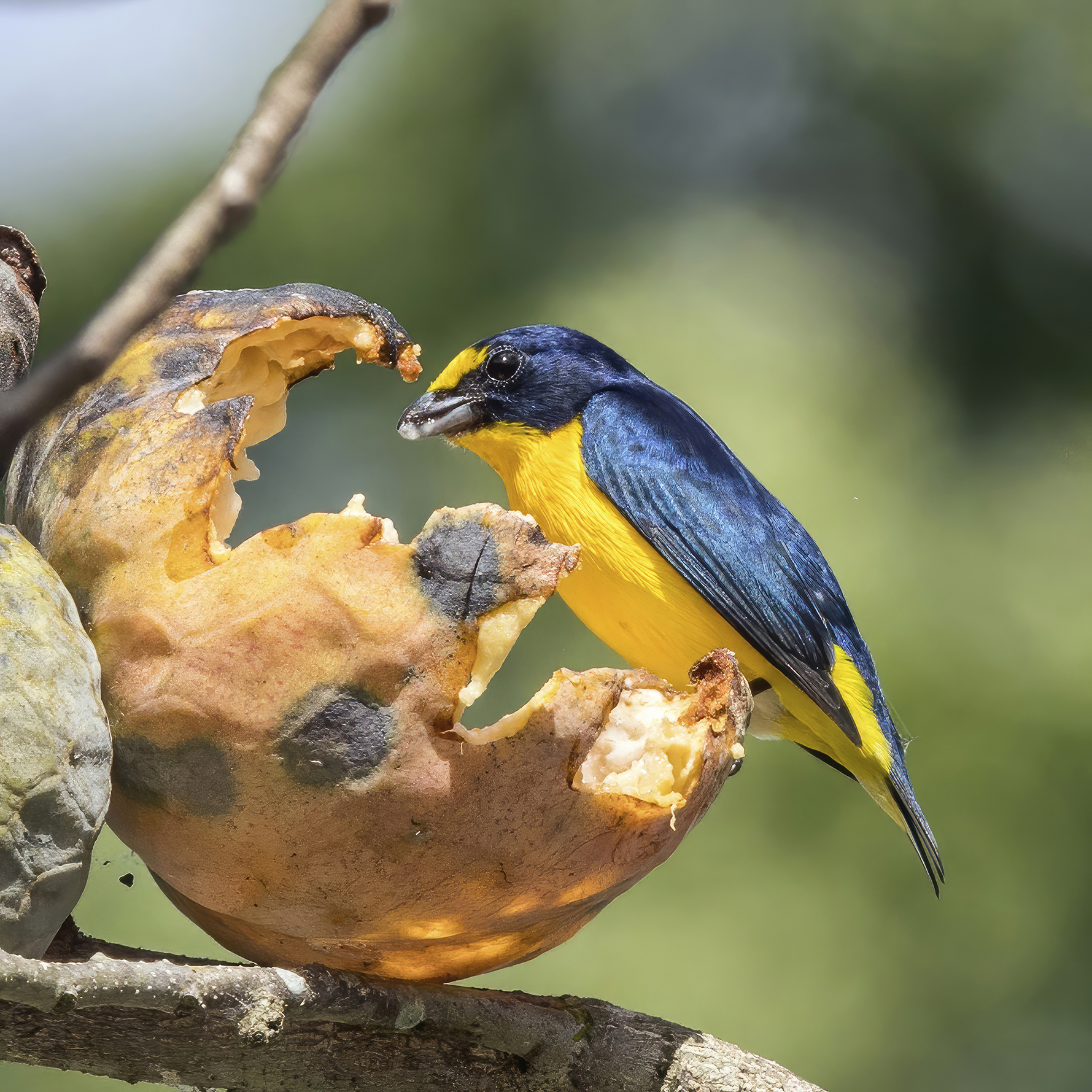
Male E. h. hirundinacea feeding on custard apple (Annona reticulata)

The yellow-throated euphonia (Euphonia hirundinacea) is a species of songbird in the family Fringillidae. It is found in southeastern Mexico and throughout Central America with its range stretching from Belize south to western Panama. It inhabits primarily both humid and dry regions where it prefers the forest edge, open woodland, and shaded plantations. It has two subspecies, the nominate subspecies Euphonia hirundinacea hirundinacea and Euphonia hirundinacea gnatho. This finch is a small bird with pointed wings and a short bill and short tail. Males of this species have dark glossy blue-black upperparts excluding a yellow forecrown, and bright yellow underparts, while females have olive green upperparts and whitish-gray breast and lower parts. It has a shrill song that alternates between high-pitched and moderately pitched and appears to be able to mimic some calls of other birds.

The yellow-throated euphonia is a frugivore that feeds primarily on mistletoe berries, which it swallows whole, and has also been observed feeding on figs and ripe bananas. Breeding dates range from March to August depending on locality. Breeding pairs work together to build a domed nest and visit the nest in pairs to feed hatchlings. It is listed as a species of least concern due to its stable population and large range.

== Taxonomy ==
The yellow-throated euphonia was formally described in 1838 by the French naturalist Charles Lucien Bonaparte based on a specimen that had probably been collected in Guatemala. He introduced the current binomial name Euphonia hirundinacea. The specific epithet is Modern Latin meaning "swallow like".

The yellow-throated euphonia is one of 27 species of the genus Euphonia, which includes arboreal passerines restricted to the Neotropics. Euphoniinae are characterized by the absence of a gizzard associated with a highly specialized frugivorous diet and the construction of domed globe-shaped nests with a side entrance. Euphonias exhibit sexual dimorphism where males are dark iridescent blue in their upperparts and yellow on their ventral side, and females are typically olive-colored above and either yellow or gray below. The genus Euphonia is paraphyletic with Chlorophonia nested in it and was traditionally considered part of Thraupinae, however recent phylogenetic analysis using mitochondrial DNA demonstrated that Euphonia and Chlorophonia formed a monophyletic group distinct from the rest of the Thraupinae, which agrees with morphological and behavioral differences between Euphonia and Chlorophonia and the Tanagers. Later molecular studies identified that euphonias belonged to the Fringillidae and specifically can be placed as sister to the Carduelinae. The presence of an entirely South American clade within the Fringillidae, which are extant primarily in the Old World, suggests that the early family history of finches underwent significant intercontinental dispersals, with euphonias adapting to a different ecological niche in the Neotropics.

Two subspecies are recognized, the nominate subspecies Euphonia hirundinacea hirundinacea and Euphonia hirundinacea gnatho. Euphonia hirundinacea gnatho differs from nominate subspecies in having a larger, more swollen bill, a more bottle-green and "less bluish" gloss of the upper parts in the male, and more yellowish underparts in the female.

== Description ==
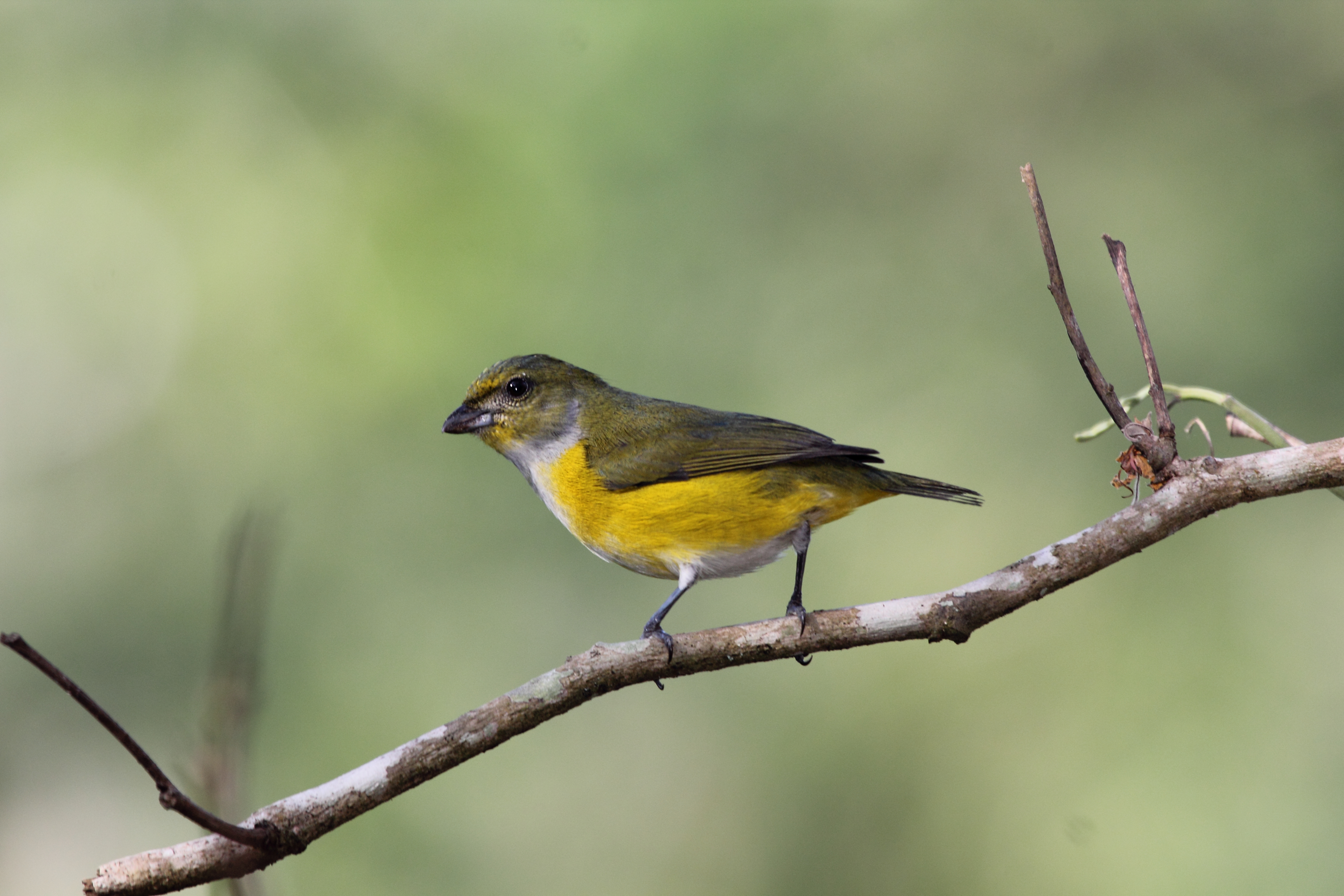
Female

The yellow-throated euphonia is a small, short-billed, short-tailed arboreal passerine with pointed wings. An adult is 10–12 cm long with the tail contributing 3.3 to 3.6 cm. The wingspan is 5.8 to 6.1 cm and weight about 11.6 – 17.8 g. The adult male of the nominate species has a small bright yellow patch on its forehead that extends back to about the middle of the eyes. The rest of the head, upperparts including upper-wing coverts, and the upper-tail coverts are a glossy blue-black. The flight feathers are black with steel blue edgings and the entire underparts are yellow. The underwing coverts are white and the under-tail coverts are a dark dull grey. The inner webs of the outer 2–3 feather pairs are mostly white forming a large, white, oval-shaped area on the wing undersurfaces. The beak tip is black, becoming blue-gray beneath nostrils and on mandible. The irises are brown and the legs and feet are dusky dark gray. The adult female has an olive-green faintly glossy metallic coloration on top of her head, side of head, and upperparts. The throat, center of breast and lower underparts are whitish to greyish-white and sides of breast, sides, and flanks are bright yellowish olive-green. Under tail-coverts are pale olive-yellowish and the beak is similar to the adult male. Juvenile males look similar to females, but plumage is of a looser texture and the olive-green of upperparts lacks gloss. Immature males also resemble females and first assume yellow feathers on the throat and median underparts as their whole ventral surface turns yellow before black begins to appear. The males then develop a black mask, black on their crown and head or a crown with mixed black and olive. The back, sides, and wings start out olive-green and are the last part of the bird to turn dark blue.

The male's song includes high pitched shrill and squeaky notes that often rapidly alternate in a choppy pattern of 2–4 notes with moderately pitched notes. Some male songs are reported to include mimicked notes from other birds, but with a smaller repertoire than the closely related E. violacea and E. laniirostris. Callnotes include a rapid "pidgel-eece," a conversational "chi-bib-bib-bib-bib," a rough hurried "tuck-a-tuck" or "chuck-a-chuck," a clear "weet," and a full-throated "queer" or "gleer". Its calls have been described as short and explosive. Females produce calls that are thin and "chaffy" in quality and are high pitched and almost trilled.

Yellow-throated euphonia males are distinctive across most of their geographic range due to their yellow throat, however they overlap with the similar thick-billed euphonia in southwestern Costa Rica and western Panama. Thick-billed euphonia also have a yellow throat, but have a more extensive yellow crown than yellow-throated euphonia and are much more common in geographic areas where their ranges overlap. Female yellow-throated euphonia are distinguishable from other sympatric Euphonia females due to their whitish or pale grey throat, center of breast, and belly, and their yellow flanks. Female scrub euphonia, thick-billed euphonia, and yellow-crowned euphonia have entirely greenish yellow to yellow ventral parts, and female white-vented euphonia have whitish throats, but a yellow breast.

== Distribution and habitat ==
The yellow-throated euphonia has a northern range limit in eastern Mexico of southern Tamaulipas, eastern San Luis Potosí, northeastern Puebla (east of Huauchinango), and northern Veracruz south to Tuxpan and Tlapacoyan. Its range extends south into Belize, Honduras, El Salvador, eastern Nicaragua, Costa Rica, and western Panama. E. h. gnatho is found in northeastern Nicaragua, Costa Rica (absent in southwest and Caribbean lowlands), and extreme Western Panama. It is found mainly in dry to humid regions along forest borders, second growth, shady plantations, and medium-height thick growing woods along river gorges and streams. Occurs from lowlands to 2100 m in Mexico and primarily in plateau and hill country in El Salvador and Costa Rica. Presumed to reside in foothills between 900 m and 1200 m elevation in western Panama. Resident over most of range with some local seasonal movement in response to food availability. In Mexico it is considered likely only a non-breeding visitor from October to May on the Pacific slope of Isthmus of Tehuantepec in Oaxaca. Found to be present in El Salvador only during the spring and summer months, so possible that it is migratory.

== Ecology and behavior ==
The yellow-throated euphonia feeds almost exclusively on fruits and berries, particularly feeding on mistletoe berries and locally feeds heavily on figs and ripe bananas. They are known as "mistletoe birds" in the islands of the Lesser Antilles and insects contribute considerably less to their diet than fruits. When they do hunt for insects, they look through leaves and small branches of trees as well as combing over seed heads of palms. They have also been observed catching insects and feeding them to their fledglings. Mistletoe berries have a moderately tough skin containing a seed and in feeding the euphonias break the outer skin with their bills and swallow the single seed surrounded by an adhesive pulp. The seeds pass through the intestinal canal wholly undigested and nutritive matter is readily assimilated without preliminary grinding. This subsistence on a particularly specialized food that does not require mechanical comminution to digest has resulted in the loss of the gizzard and the specialization of the digestive tract into a simple membranous sac connecting the esophagus and duodenum, which is arranged to permit the rapid and unobstructed passage of food through the entire length of the canal.

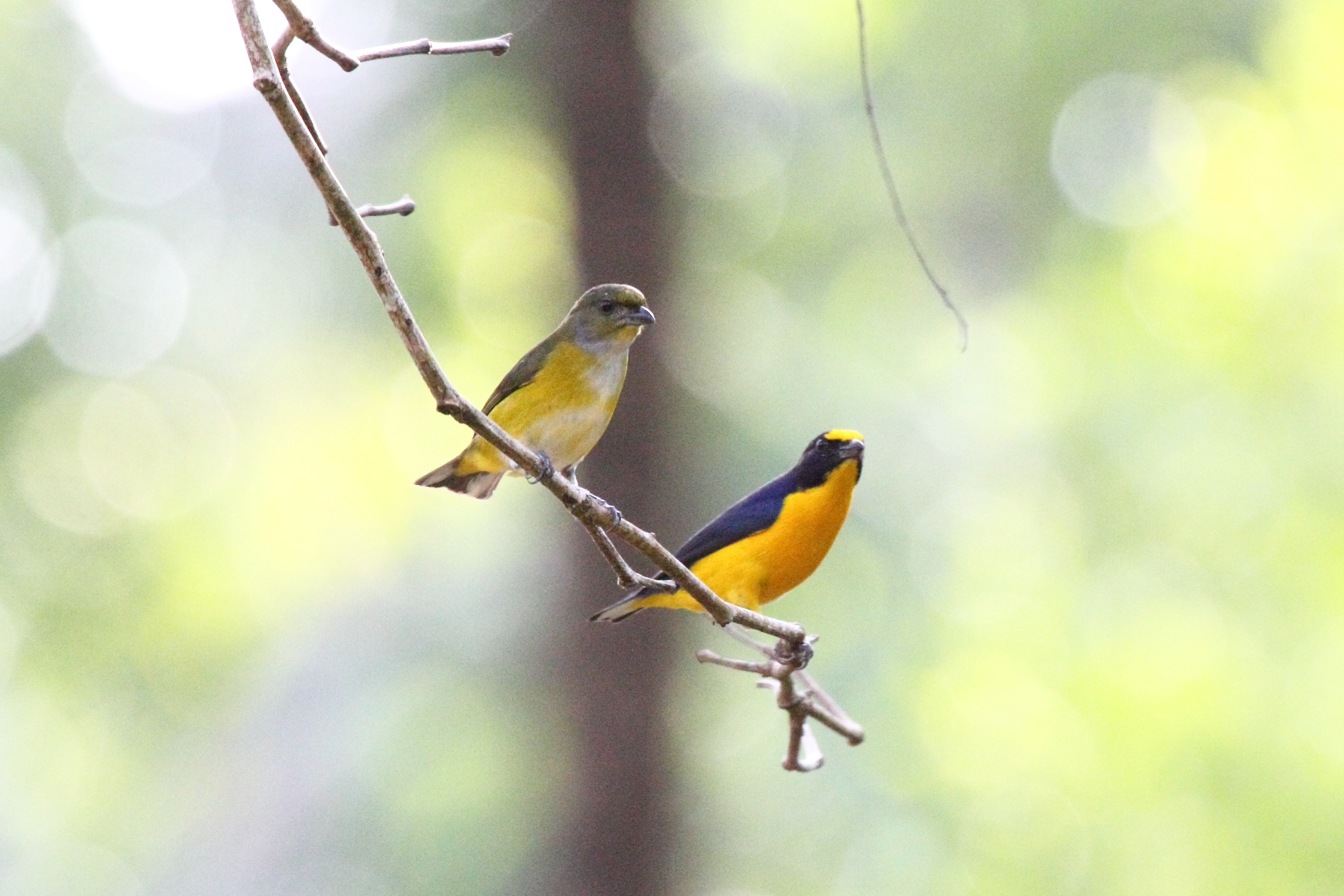
Female (left) and male (right)

Yellow-throated euphonia breeding is reported in May and August in Mexico, June in Belize, March–May in Guatemala and April–June in Costa Rica. Nests are dome-shaped with a side entrance and are made from grass, narrow leaves, rootlets, moss, and lichens. They are placed anywhere from eye level to 15 m up in stream bank niches, roadside banks, on tree trunks, on branches or palm fronds, within epiphytes or in clumps of moss. Yellow-throated euphonias were found to lay an average of five eggs at one-day intervals with incubation lasting about 15 days and female brooding of the young through day 6 or 7 after hatching. This clutch size is among the highest reported for neotropical passerines with other species of euphonia typically laying three to four eggs per clutch. Their eggs are white and lightly spotted brownish at larger end. Parents build the nest together and visit the nest in pairs thereafter, virtually always accompanying each other to the nest entrance in a possible example of mate guarding or distraction display. Nestlings are primarily fed regurgitated fruits and seeds starting on the day of hatching and chicks fledge at 19 days. The yellow-throated euphonia is unusual in that it feeds its young regurgitated fruits and seeds at hatching, but does not appear to feed them many insects or other animal protein throughout the growth period. This may be due to their specialized digestive tract which makes ingesting harder foods difficult. Yellow-throated euphonia occur in pairs throughout the year, but do not defend territories.

== Relationship with humans ==
Currently the yellow-throated euphonia is listed as a species of least concern due to a stable current population trend, lack of evidence for decline of adult members of the species, and a large estimated range of 1,440,000 square km. Yellow-throated euphonia were observed to be kept in cages in San Jose, Costa Rica in 1892, but there is a lack of information about current relationships with humans. They are believed to be tolerant of habitat disturbance as they commonly occupy plantations, second growth, and forests edge. They have been observed to nest near human habitation in dirt road banks about 1–3.5 m above the ground as well as in rotting fence posts.
