= Eremobates affinis =

Scientific classification
- Domain: Eukaryota
- Kingdom: Animalia
- Phylum: Arthropoda
- Subphylum: Chelicerata
- Class: Arachnida
- Order: Solifugae
- Family: Eremobatidae
- Genus: Eremobates
- Species: E. affinis

Binomial name
- Eremobates affinis (Kraepelin, 1899)

Species of camel spider

Eremobates affinis is a species of camel spider in the family Eremobatidae.
