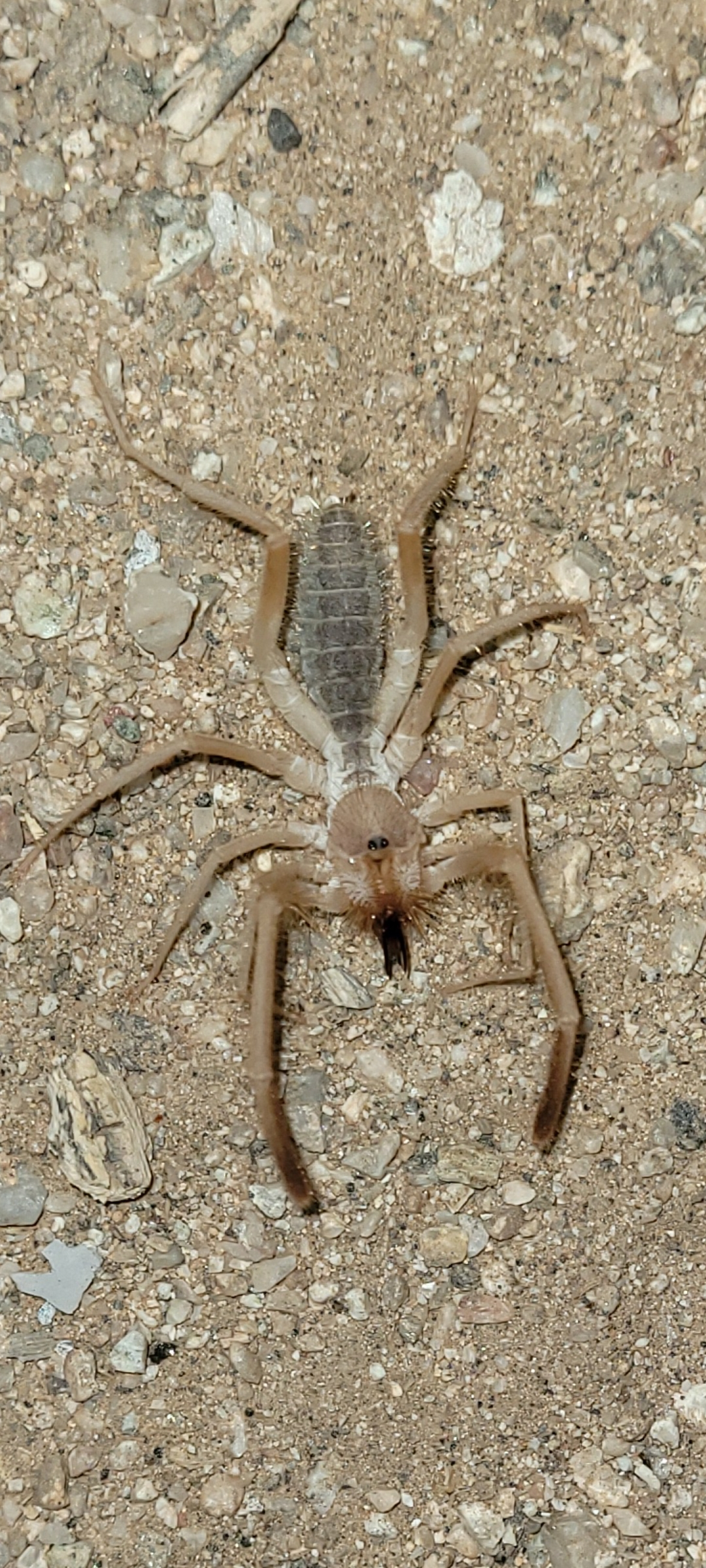
- Eremobates sp.male from Arizona

Scientific classification
- Kingdom: Animalia
- Phylum: Arthropoda
- Subphylum: Chelicerata
- Class: Arachnida
- Order: Solifugae
- Family: Eremobatidae
- Subfamily: Eremobatinae
- Genus: Eremobates; Banks, 1900

Type species
- Eremobates cinerascens (C.L. Koch, 1842)

Species
- 97, see text

= Eremobates =

Genus of solifuges

Eremobates is a genus of arachnids of the order Solifugae. About 2 inches long, these fast-moving arachnids have the largest jaw size to body ratio of any animal. They are not venomous, but have a remarkably powerful bite. Often hunting at night, they have poor eyesight and navigate mostly by use of a pair of pedipalps.

They are solitary creatures, coming together only to mate, the male using his pedipalps to transfer seminal fluid to the female, which buries between 50 and 200 eggs in the ground. The female stays with the young until they are mature enough to hunt and defend themselves, feeding and caring for them.

Species of the genus Eremobates are generally found in the western United States, and at northern end into southwestern Canada, and south into Mexico.

== Species ==
As of January 2023, the World Solifugae Catalog accepts the following ninety-seven species:

- Eremobates actenidia Muma, 1989 — US (Utah)
- Eremobates affinis (Kraepelin, 1899) — Mexico, US (Arizona)
- Eremobates ajoanus Muma & Brookhart, 1988 — US (Arizona)
- Eremobates angustus Muma, 1951 — US (Arizona, Texas, Washington)
- Eremobates arizonicus (Roewer, 1934) — US
- Eremobates ascopulatus Muma, 1951 — US (California, Nevada, Utah)
- Eremobates audax Hirst, 1912 — Mexico
- Eremobates axacoa Cushing & Brookhart, 2016 — Mexico
- Eremobates aztecus Pocock, 1902 — Mexico
- Eremobates bajadae Muma & Brookhart, 1988 — US (Arizona, New Mexico)
- Eremobates bajaensis Muma, 1986 — Mexico
- Eremobates bantai Brookhart, 1965 — US (Colorado)
- Eremobates barberi (Muma, 1951) — US (Texas)
- Eremobates becki Muma, 1986 — Mexico
- Eremobates bixleri Muma & Brookhart, 1988 — US (Arizona)
- Eremobates bonito Cushing & Brookhart, 2016 — Mexico
- Eremobates californicus (Simon, 1879) — US (California)
- Eremobates carolinianus (Kraepelin, 1899) — US (North Carolina)
- Eremobates chihuaensis Brookhart & Cushing, 2002 — Mexico
- Eremobates cinerascens (C. L. Koch, 1842) — Mexico
- Eremobates clarus Muma, 1989 — US (Colorado, Wyoming)
- Eremobates coahuilanus Muma, 1986 — Mexico
- Eremobates constrictus (Putnam, 1882) — unknown
- Eremobates corpink Brookhart & Cushing, 2004 — US (Utah)
- Eremobates cruzi Muma, 1951 — US (Arizona)
- Eremobates ctenidiellus Muma, 1951 — Mexico, US (California, Colorado, Idaho, Nevada, Oregon, Utah, Washington)
- Eremobates cyranoi Cushing & Brookhart, 2016 — Mexico
- Eremobates dentilis Brookhart & Muma, 1981 — US (Arizona)
- Eremobates dilatatus (Putnam, 1882) — Mexico
- Eremobates dinamita (Roewer, 1934) — Mexico
- Eremobates docolora Brookhart & Muma, 1981 — Canada (Alberta, British Columbia, Saskatchewan), US (Colorado, North Dakota, Montana, Wyoming)
- Eremobates dorsalis (Roewer, 1934) — US (California)
- Eremobates durangonus Roewer, 1934 — Mexico, US (Arizona, California)
- Eremobates elongatus (C.L. Koch, 1842) — Mexico
- Eremobates fagei (Roewer, 1934) — Mexico
- Eremobates fisheri Cushing & Brookhart, 2016 — US (California)
- Eremobates formicarius (C. L. Koch, 1842) — Mexico
- Eremobates gerbae Brookhart & Cushing, 2002 — US (Arizona)
- Eremobates girardii (Putnam, 1883) — US (Arkansas)
- Eremobates gracilidens Muma, 1951 — US (Arizona, California)
- Eremobates guenini (Roewer, 1934) — Mexico
- Eremobates hessei (Roewer, 1934) — Mexico, US (New Mexico)
- Eremobates hidalgoana Cushing & Brookhart, 2016 — Mexico
- Eremobates hodai Muma, 1989 — US (Idaho, Oregon)
- Eremobates hystrix (Mello-Leitao, 1942) — Mexico
- Eremobates icenogelei Brookhart & Cushing, 2004 — US (California)
- Eremobates ingens (Mello-Leitão, 1942) — Mexico
- Eremobates inkopaensis Brookhart & Cushing, 2005 — US (California)
- Eremobates inyoanus Muma & Brookhart, 1988 — US (California)
- Eremobates jaliscoana Cushing & Brookhart, 2016 — Mexico
- Eremobates kastoni Muma & Brookhart, 1988 — US (California)
- Eremobates kiseri Muma & Brookhart, 1988 — US (Texas)
- Eremobates kraepelini Muma, 1951 — Mexico, US (Arizona, California, Nevada, New Mexico, Texas, Utah)
- Eremobates lapazi Muma, 1986 — US (Mexico)
- Eremobates leechi Muma & Brookhart, 1988 — US (California)
- Eremobates legalis Harvey, 2002 — Mexico
- Eremobates lentiginosus (Kraepelin, 1899) — Mexico
- Eremobates marathoni Muma, 1951 — Mexico, US (Arizona, New Mexico, Texas)
- Eremobates minamoritaana Cushing & Brookhart, 2016 — Mexico
- Eremobates mormonus (Roewer, 1934) — US (Arizona, Colorado, New Mexico, Utah)
- Eremobates nanus Muma, 1962 — US (California)
- Eremobates nivis Muma & Brookhart, 1988 — US (California)
- Eremobates nodularis Muma, 1951 — Mexico, US (Arizona, California, New Mexico, Texas)
- Eremobates norrisi Muma & Brookhart, 1988 — US (Colorado, New Mexico, Texas)
- Eremobates otavonae Muma & Brookhart, 1988 — US (California)
- Eremobates paleta Brookhart & Cushing, 2005 — Mexico
- Eremobates pallidus Muma & Brookhart, 1988 — US (California, Nevada, Utah)
- Eremobates pallipes (Say, 1823) — Mexico, US (Colorado, Nebraska, New Mexico, Oklahoma, South Dakota, Texas, Wyoming)
- Eremobates palpisetulosus Fichter, 1941 — Mexico, US (Arizona, Colorado, Kansas, Nebraska, Oklahoma, Texas)
- Eremobates papillatus Muma, 1970 — Mexico, US (California)
- Eremobates pimanus Muma & Brookhart, 1988 — US (Arizona)
- Eremobates polhemusi Muma & Brookhart, 1988 — US (Utah)
- Eremobates purpusi (Roewer, 1934) — Mexico, US (California)
- Eremobates putnamii (Banks, 1898) — Mexico
- Eremobates pyriflora Muma & Brookhart, 1988 — US (California)
- Eremobates scaber (Kraepelin, 1899) — Canada (British Columbia), US (Oregon, Washington)
- Eremobates scopulatellus Muma & Brookhart, 1988 — US (California)
- Eremobates scopulatus Muma, 1951 — Mexico, US (California, Nevada, New Mexico, Utah)
- Eremobates similis Muma, 1951 — US (Colorado, New Mexico, Utah)
- Eremobates simoni Muma, 1970 — US (California, New Mexico, Oklahoma, Texas)
- Eremobates socal Brookhart & Cushing, 2004 — US (California)
- Eremobates spissus Muma & Brookhart, 1988 — US (California)
- Eremobates sulfureus (Simon, 1879) — US (Colorado)
- Eremobates suspectus Muma, 1951 — US (Arizona)
- Eremobates tejonus Chamberlin, 1925 — US (California)
- Eremobates texanus Muma & Brookhart, 1988 — US (Texas)
- Eremobates titschacki (Roewer, 1934) — US
- Eremobates toltecus (Pocock, 1895) — Mexico
- Eremobates tuberculatus (Kraepelin, 1899) — US
- Eremobates vallis Muma, 1989 — US (Nevada)
- Eremobates vicinus Muma, 1963 — US (California, Nevada)
- Eremobates villosus Muma, 1951 — US (California)
- Eremobates williamsi Muma & Brookhart, 1951 — US (California)
- Eremobates woodruffi Brookhart & Muma, 1988 — US (Texas)
- Eremobates zacatecana Cushing & Brookhart, 2016 — Mexico
- Eremobates zapal Cushing & Brookhart, 2016 — Mexico
- Eremobates zinni Muma, 1951 — Mexico, US (California, Nevada, Utah)
