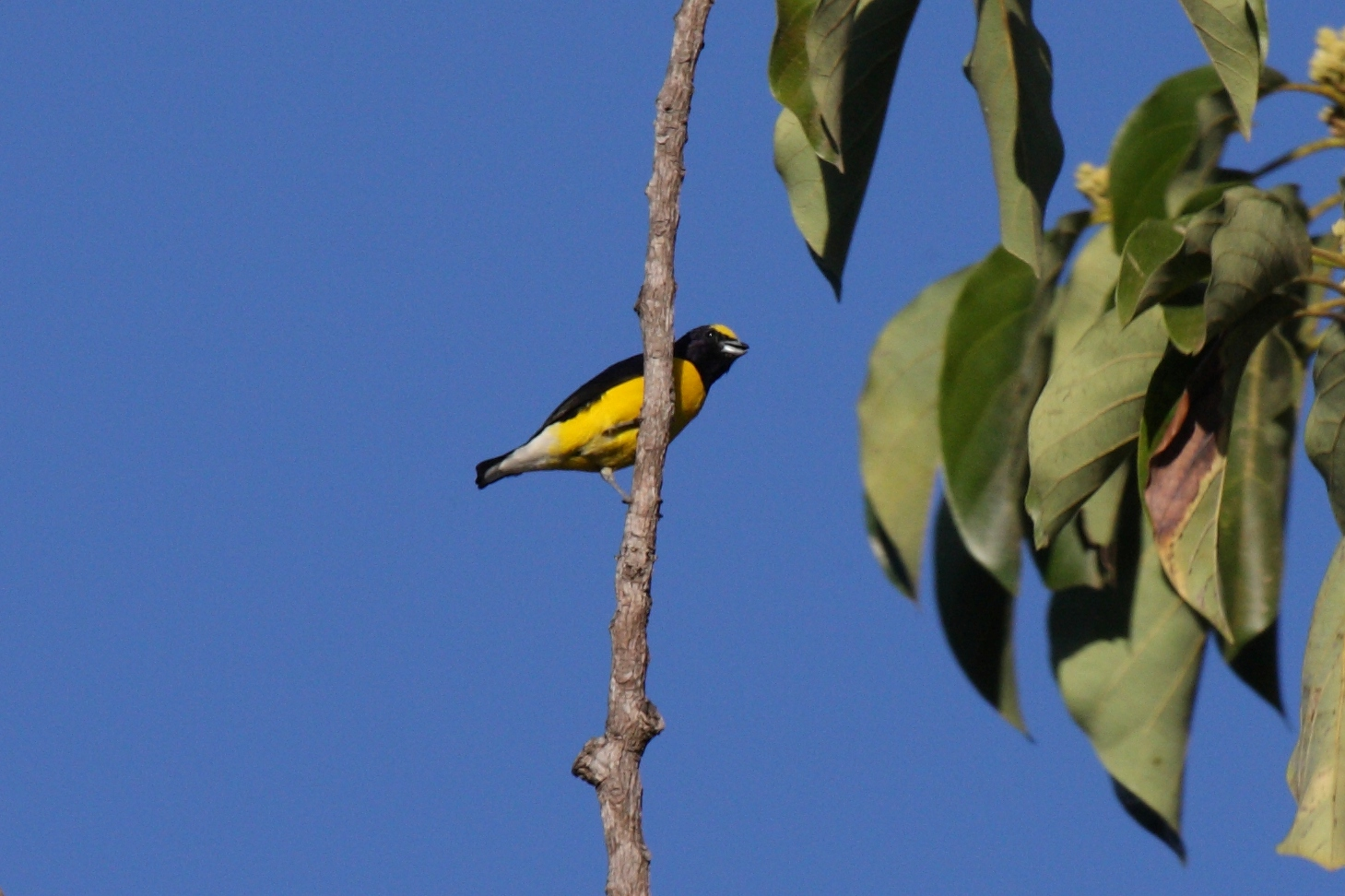
- Male
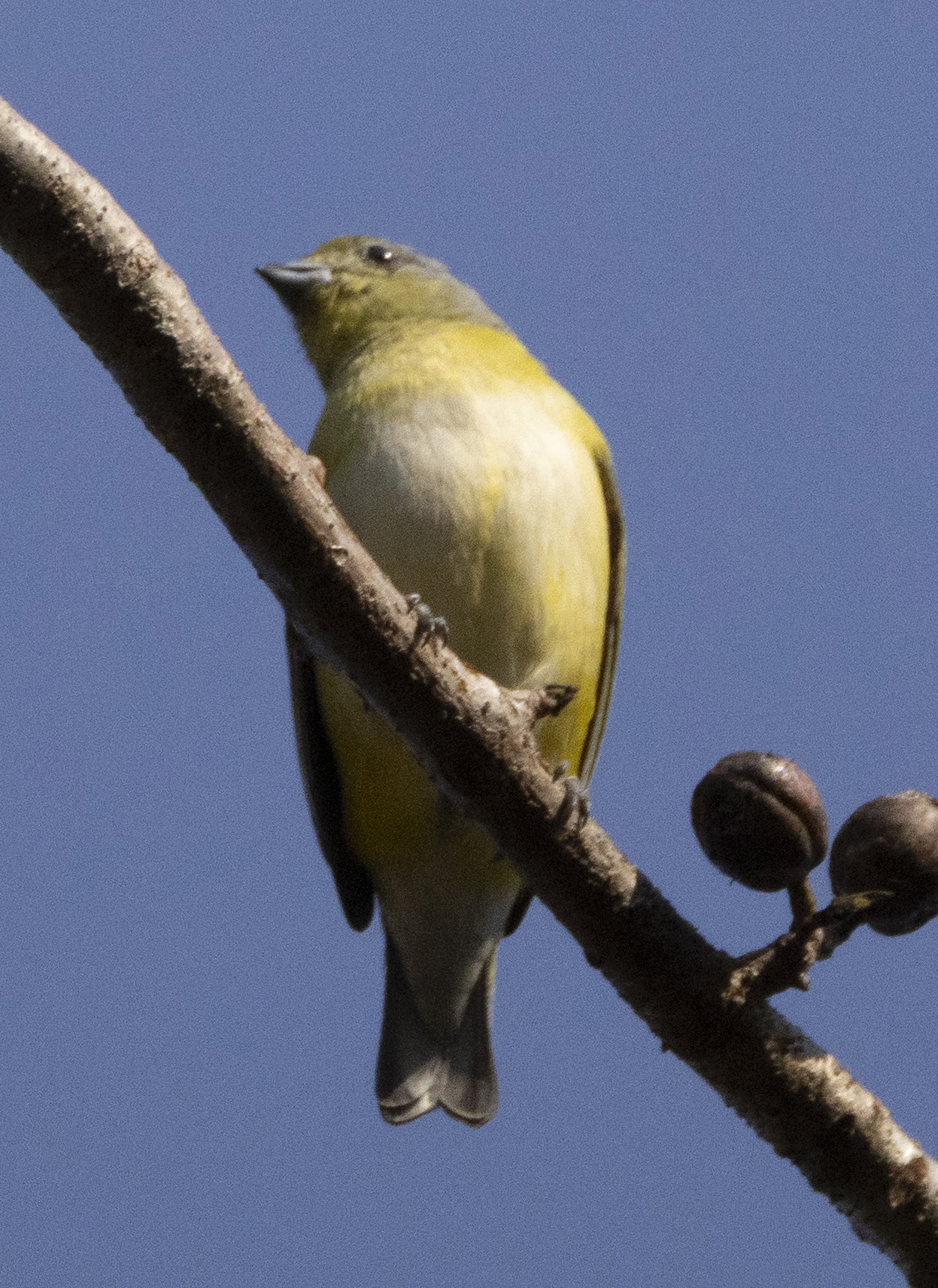
- Female

Scientific classification
- Kingdom: Animalia
- Phylum: Chordata
- Class: Aves
- Order: Passeriformes
- Family: Fringillidae
- Subfamily: Euphoniinae
- Genus: Euphonia
- Species: E. godmani

Binomial name
- Euphonia godmani Brewster, 1889

= West Mexican euphonia =

Species of bird

The West Mexican euphonia (Euphonia godmani) is a species of bird in the family Fringillidae, the finches and euphonias. It is endemic to Mexico.

== Taxonomy and systematics ==
The West Mexican euphonia was originally described by William Brewster in 1889 with its current binomial Euphonia godmani. Brewster called it "Godman's euphonia"; that English name and its specific epithet honor Frederick DuCane Godman.

The West Mexican euphonia was later reassigned as a subspecies of the scrub euphonia (E. affinis). (Brewster had noted the strong resemblance of the two.) Most major taxonomic systems again recognized it as a full species in 2021 and the first version of AviList (2025) followed suit. However, as of late 2025, BirdLife International's Handbook of the Birds of the World (HBW) retains it as a subspecies.

The genus Euphonia had long placed in the family Thraupidae, the "true" tanagers. Multiple studies in the late twentieth and early twenty-first centuries resulted in its being reassigned to its present place in the family Fringillidae.

== Description ==
The West Mexican euphonia is about 10 cm (3.9 in) long. The species is sexually dimorphic. Adult males have a small yellow forecrown; the color extends just to the eye. The rest of their head and nape are glossy blue-black with a purplish sheen. Their upperparts are glossy blue-black. Their tail is mostly blackish with white inner webs on the outer two pairs of feathers. Their upperwing coverts and flight feathers are blackish with some dark blue gloss. Their chin and throat are glossy blue-black with a purplish sheen, their breast and belly bright yellow, and their undertail coverts white. Adult females have an olive-yellow forehead, a grayish crown and nape, and an olive-yellow face. Their upperparts, wings, and tail are olive with a gray tinge on the back. Their underparts are mostly olive-yellow with a white center to the belly, yellowish flanks, and white undertail coverts. Both sexes have a dark brown iris, a pale bluish gray bill with a blackish tip, and dark gray legs and feet.

== Distribution and habitat ==
The West Mexican euphonia is found in the western Mexican lowlands from southeastern Sonora south to central Guerrero. It inhabits several landscapes in the tropical zone that have highly contrasting dry and wet seasons. These include deciduous forest, gallery forest, secondary forest, and the edges of evergreen forest. In elevation it ranges from near sea level to about 1,000 m (3,300 ft).

== Behavior ==
=== Movement ===
The West Mexican euphonia is generally a resident species but does some local wandering after the breeding season.

=== Feeding ===
The West Mexican euphonia feeds primarily on the fruits of mistletoe (Loranthaceae) and other small fruits including those of figs (Ficus) and probably cultivated fruits. It also includes small numbers of insects in its diet. It is known to join mixed-species feeding flocks.

=== Breeding ===
The West Mexican euphonia's breeding season includes May but is otherwise not defined. Its nest is football-shaped with a side entrance and made from several kinds of plant fibers lined with fungal fibers. Nests have been found in branch forks between about 3.5 and 8 m (10 and 25 ft) above the ground. The clutch size, incubation period, time to fledging, and details of parental care are not known.

=== Vocalization ===
The West Mexican euphonia's calls include "1–3 pure thin whistles, dee-dee-dee, sometimes followed by 2 or 3 more on [the] same or slightly lower pitch", a "shorter whit-it-it-it", and a "longer wheeee". It sings less than it calls, with "a weak twittering and chirping medley, e.g. wheetidy-titity-witity-titity".

== Status ==
The IUCN follows HBW taxonomy and therefore has not assessed the West Mexican euphonia separately from the scrub euphonia. It is considered widespread and considered fairly numerous, and there are several protected areas within its range. "The species thrives also in drier settled or disturbed areas, so long as there are scattered trees and woodlots."
