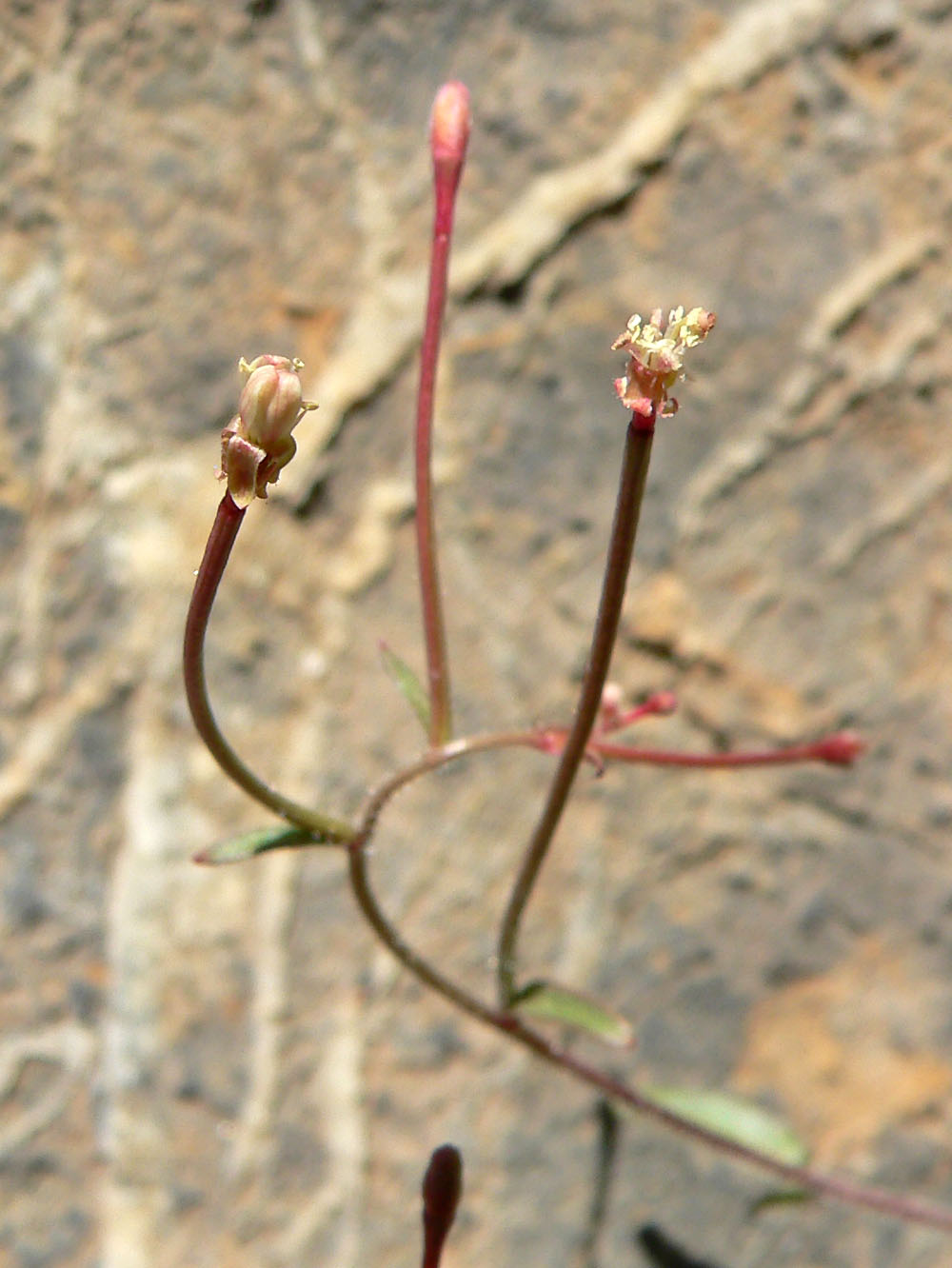

Scientific classification
- Kingdom: Plantae
- Clade: Tracheophytes
- Clade: Angiosperms
- Clade: Eudicots
- Clade: Rosids
- Order: Myrtales
- Family: Onagraceae
- Genus: Eremothera
- Species: E. chamaenerioides

Binomial name
- Eremothera chamaenerioides (A.Gray) W.L.Wagner & Hoch

Synonyms
- Camissonia chamaenerioides (A.Gray) P.H.Raven; Oenothera chamaenerioides A.Gray; Sphaerostigma chamaenerioides (A.Gray) Small

= Eremothera chamaenerioides =

Species of flowering plant

Eremothera chamaenerioides is a species of evening primrose known by the common name long-capsule suncup. It is native to the southwestern United States and northern Mexico, where it grows especially in desert regions. It is an annual herb producing an erect, hairy, glandular stem which is reddish in color and up to half a meter tall. The leaves are lance-shaped or oval and up to 7 or 8 centimeters long. The nodding inflorescence produces several flowers, each with white petals a few millimeters long and drying to dull red. The fruit is a capsule 3 to 5 centimeters long.
