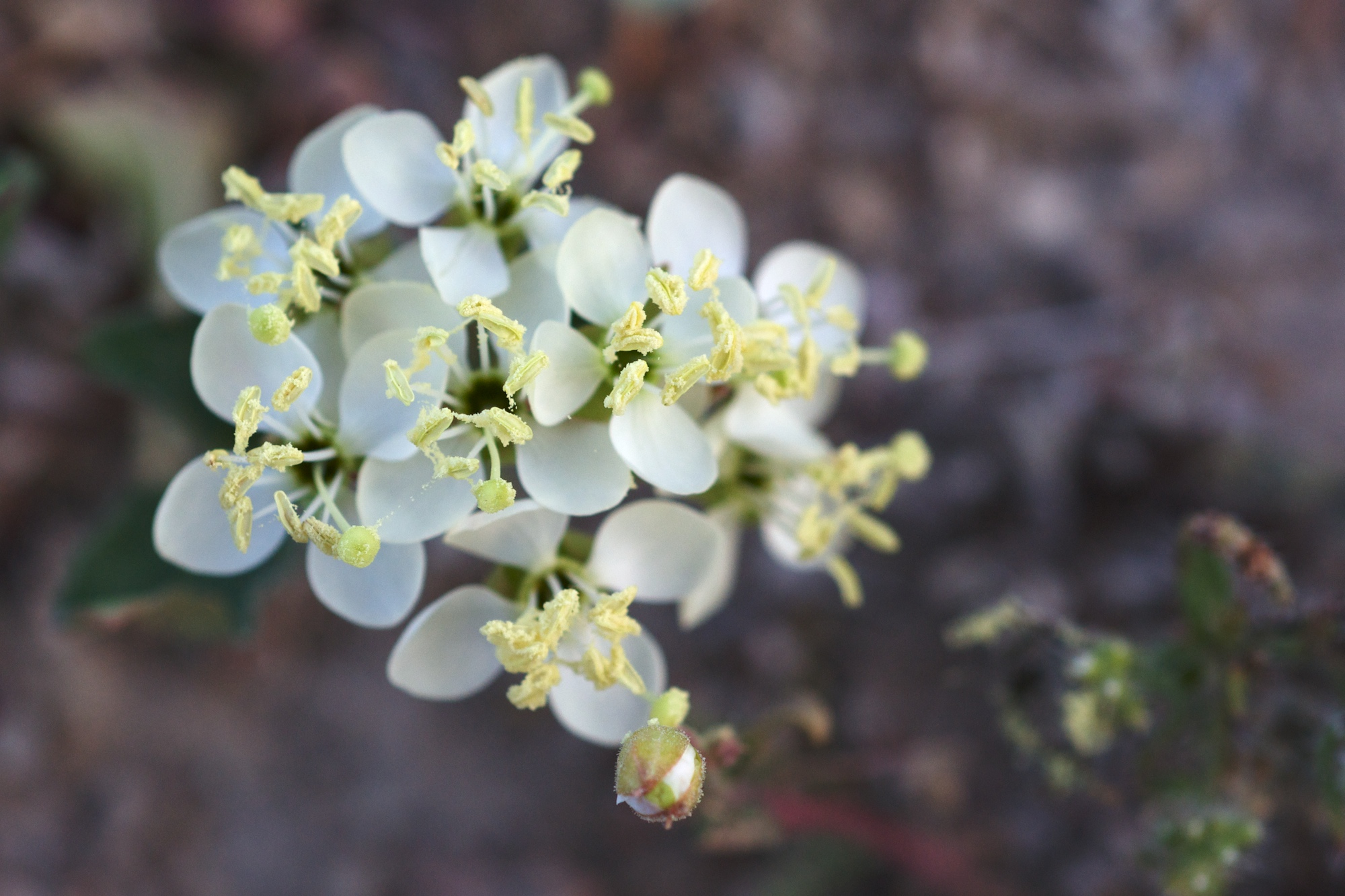

Scientific classification
- Kingdom: Plantae
- Clade: Tracheophytes
- Clade: Angiosperms
- Clade: Eudicots
- Clade: Rosids
- Order: Myrtales
- Family: Onagraceae
- Genus: Eremothera
- Species: E. boothii

Binomial name
- Eremothera boothii (Douglas) W.L.Wagner & Hoch

Synonyms
- Camissonia boothii (Douglas) P.H.Raven; Oenothera boothii Douglas; Sphaerostigma boothii (Douglas) Walp.

= Eremothera boothii =

Species of flowering plant

Eremothera boothii is a species of wildflower known as Booth's evening primrose or Booth's sun-cup. This plant is native to the western United States and northwestern Mexico where it is most abundant in arid areas such as deserts. This is an annual plant with hairy reddish-green stems and mottled foliage. The stem ends in a nodding inflorescence of many small flowers which may be white to red or yellowish, often with darker shades on the external surfaces of the four spoon-shaped petals. They have long stamens with clublike yellowish anthers. Flowers of this species tend to open at dusk rather than dawn as in many other Camissonia. The fruit is a twisted capsule one to 3 centimeters long. Plant appearances may vary across subspecies.

There are several subspecies:

- E. b. ssp. alyssoides - Pine Creek evening primrose, alyssum evening primrose
- E. b. ssp. boothii
- E. b. ssp. condensata - clustered suncup
- E. b. ssp. decorticans - shredding suncup
- E. b. ssp. desertorum - desert suncup
- E. b. ssp. intermedia
