= Horribates =

Scientific classification
- Kingdom: Animalia
- Phylum: Arthropoda
- Subphylum: Chelicerata
- Class: Arachnida
- Order: Solifugae
- Family: Eremobatidae
- Subfamily: Eremobatinae
- Genus: Horribates; Muma, 1962

Type species
- Horribates spinigerus Muma, 1962

Species
- 3, see text

Genus of camel spiders

Horribates is a genus of eremobatid camel spiders, first described by Martin Hammond Muma in 1962.

== Species ==
As of February 2023, the World Solifugae Catalog accepts the following three species:

- Horribates bantai Muma, 1989 — US (California)
- Horribates minimus Muma, 1989 — US (California)
- Horribates spinigerus Muma, 1962 — US (California, Nevada)
