= Eremochelis =

- Eremochelis striodorsalis

Scientific classification
- Kingdom: Animalia
- Phylum: Arthropoda
- Subphylum: Chelicerata
- Class: Arachnida
- Order: Solifugae
- Family: Eremobatidae
- Subfamily: Therobatinae
- Genus: Eremochelis; Roewer, 1934

Type species
- Eremochelis insignatus Roewer, 1934

Species
- 39, see text

Genus of camel spiders

Eremochelis is a genus of Eremobatid camel spiders, first described by Carl Friedrich Roewer in 1934.

== Species ==
As of February 2023, the World Solifugae Catalog accepts the following thirty-nine species:

- Eremochelis acrilobatus (Muma, 1962) — US (California)
- Eremochelis albaventralis Brookhart and Cushing, 2005 — Mexico, US (California)
- Eremochelis andreasana (Muma, 1962) — Mexico
- Eremochelis arcus (Muma, 1962) — US (California, Nevada)
- Eremochelis bechteli Muma, 1989 — US (Nevada)
- Eremochelis bidepressus (Muma, 1951) — US (Idaho, Nevada)
- Eremochelis bilobatus (Muma, 1951) — Mexico, US (Arizona, California, Colorado, New Mexico, Texas)
- Eremochelis branchi (Muma, 1951) — US (Arizona, California, Nevada)
- Eremochelis cochiseae Muma, 1989 — US (Arizona)
- Eremochelis coloradensis (Muma, 1962) — US (Arizona)
- Eremochelis cuyamacanus (Muma, 1962) — US (California)
- Eremochelis flavus Muma, 1989 — US (California)
- Eremochelis flexacus (Muma, 1963) — Mexico, US (Nevada)
- Eremochelis fuscellus Muma, 1989 — US (Arizona, California)
- Eremochelis gertschi (Muma, 1951) — US (Utah)
- Eremochelis giboi Muma, 1989 — US (California)
- Eremochelis imperialis (Muma, 1951) — Mexico, US (Arizona, California, Nevada)
- Eremochelis insignatus Roewer, 1934 — US (Arizona, California, Colorado, Nevada)
- Eremochelis iviei (Muma, 1951) — US (Arizona)
- Eremochelis kastoni Rowland, 1974 — US (California)
- Eremochelis kerni Muma, 1989 — US (California)
- Eremochelis lagunensis Vázquez, 1991 — Mexico
- Eremochelis larreae (Muma, 1962) — US (California)
- Eremochelis macswaini (Muma, 1962) — US (California)
- Eremochelis malkini (Muma, 1951) — US (Arizona, California, Utah)
- Eremochelis medialis (Muma, 1951) — US (California)
- Eremochelis morrisi (Muma, 1951) — US (California)
- Eremochelis noonani Muma, 1989 — US (California)
- Eremochelis nudus (Muma, 1963) — US (Nevada)
- Eremochelis oregonensis Brookhart & Cushing, 2005 — US (Oregon)
- Eremochelis plicatus (Muma, 1962) — US (Nevada)
- Eremochelis rossi Muma, 1986 — Mexico
- Eremochelis rothi (Muma, 1962) — US (Arizona)
- Eremochelis saltoni Muma, 1989 — US (California)
- Eremochelis sonorae Muma, 1986 — Mexico
- Eremochelis striodorsalis (Muma, 1962) — US (California)
- Eremochelis tanneri Muma, 1989 — US (Utah)
- Eremochelis truncus Muma, 1986 — Mexico
- Eremochelis undulus Roewer, 1934 — US (Colorado)
