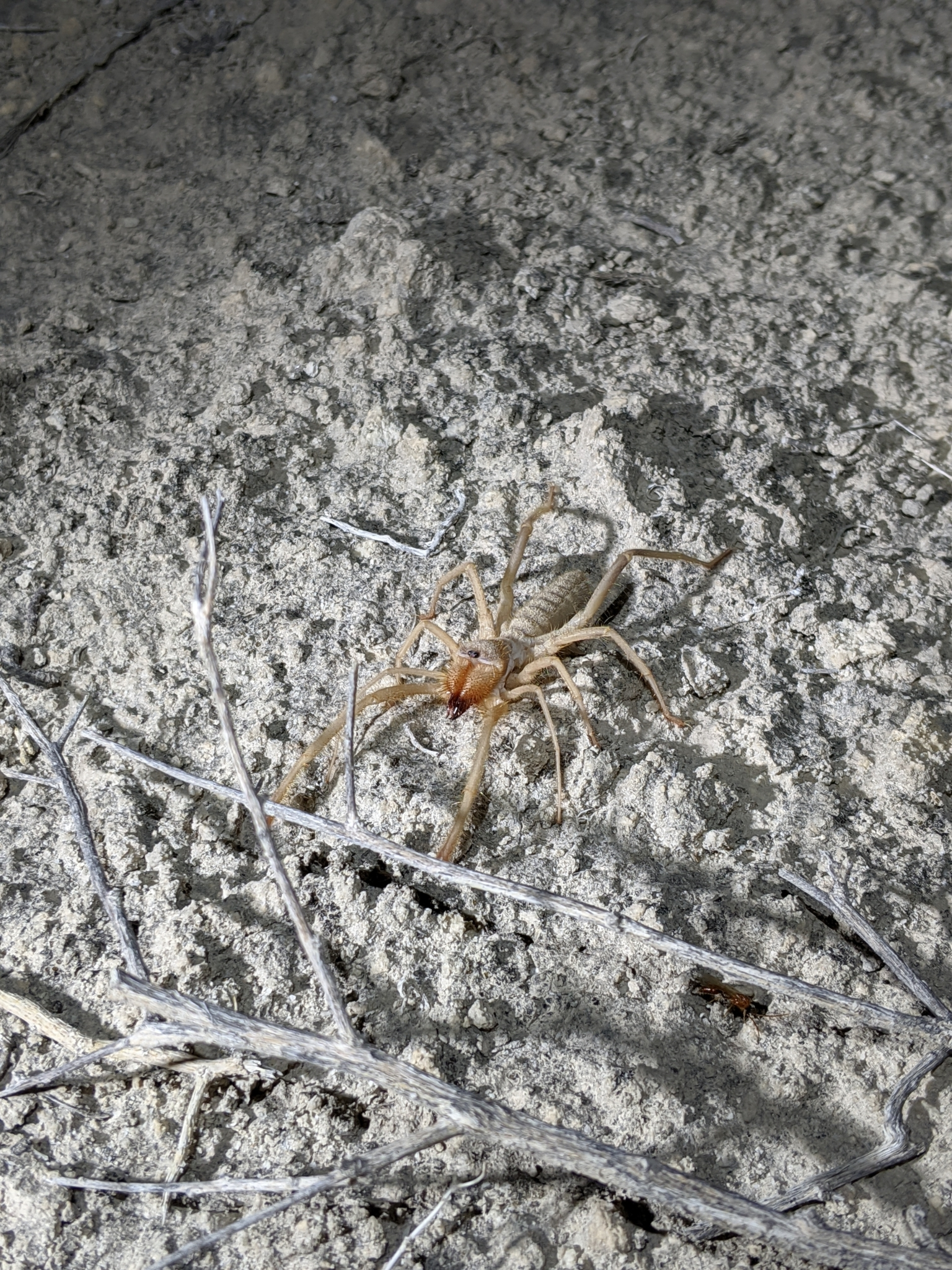
- Eremocosta gigasella

Scientific classification
- Domain: Eukaryota
- Kingdom: Animalia
- Phylum: Arthropoda
- Subphylum: Chelicerata
- Class: Arachnida
- Order: Solifugae
- Family: Eremobatidae
- Subfamily: Eremobatinae
- Genus: Eremocosta; Roewer, 1934

Type species
- Eremocosta gigas Roewer, 1934

Species
- 14, see text

= Eremocosta =

Genus of camel spiders

Eremocosta is a genus of Eremobatid camel spiders, first described by Carl Friedrich Roewer in 1934.

== Species ==
As of February 2023, the World Solifugae Catalog accepts the following fourteen species:

- Eremocosta acuitlapanensis (Vázquez & Gaviño-Rojas, 2000) — Mexico
- Eremocosta arenarum Ballesteros & Francke, 2007 — Mexico
- Eremocosta bajaensis (Muma, 1986) — Mexico, US (California)
- Eremocosta calexicensis (Muma, 1951) — Mexico, US (Arizona, California)
- Eremocosta formidabilis (Simon, 1879) — Mexico
- Eremocosta fusca (Muma, 1986) — Mexico
- Eremocosta gigas Roewer, 1934 — Mexico
- Eremocosta gigasella (Muma, 1970) — Mexico, US (New Mexico, Texas)
- Eremocosta montezuma (Roewer, 1934) — Mexico
- Eremocosta nigrimana (Pocock, 1895) — unknown
- Eremocosta robusta (Roewer, 1934) — US (California)
- Eremocosta spinipalpis (Kraepelin, 1899) — Mexico
- Eremocosta striata (Putnam, 1883) — Mexico, US (Arizona, California)
- Eremocosta titania (Muma, 1951) — Mexico, US (California, Nevada)
