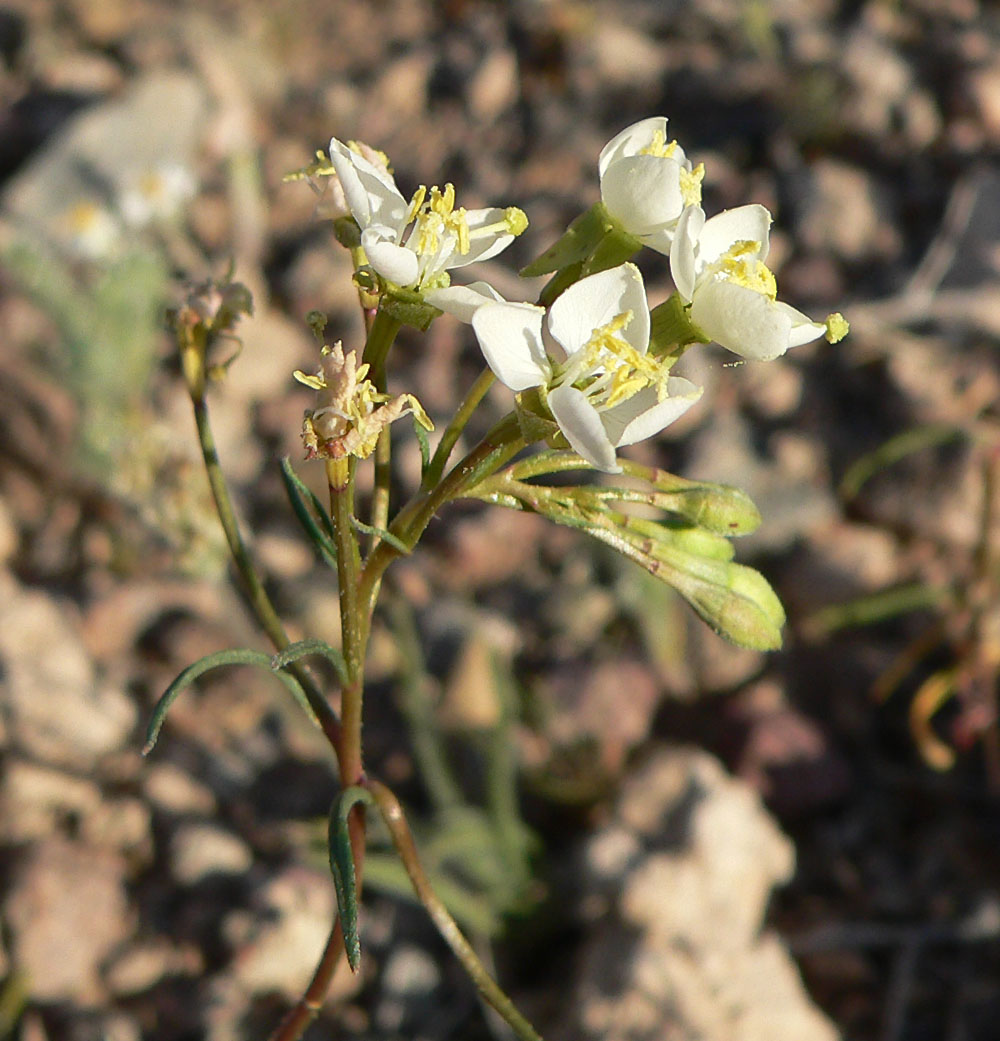

Scientific classification
- Kingdom: Plantae
- Clade: Tracheophytes
- Clade: Angiosperms
- Clade: Eudicots
- Clade: Rosids
- Order: Myrtales
- Family: Onagraceae
- Genus: Eremothera
- Species: E. refracta

Binomial name
- Eremothera refracta (S.Watson) W.L.Wagner & Hoch

Synonyms
- Camissonia refracta (S.Watson) P.H.Raven; Oenothera refracta S.Watson; Sphaerostigma refractum (S.Watson) Small

= Eremothera refracta =

Species of flowering plant

Eremothera refracta is a species of evening primrose known by the common name narrowleaf suncup. It is native to the southwestern United States, especially desert areas. It is an annual herb producing a hairy red or reddish green leafy stem up to about 45 centimeters in maximum height. The nodding inflorescence produces flowers with white petals a few millimeters long which turn reddish as they wither. The fruit is a straight or coiling capsule up to 5 centimeters long.
