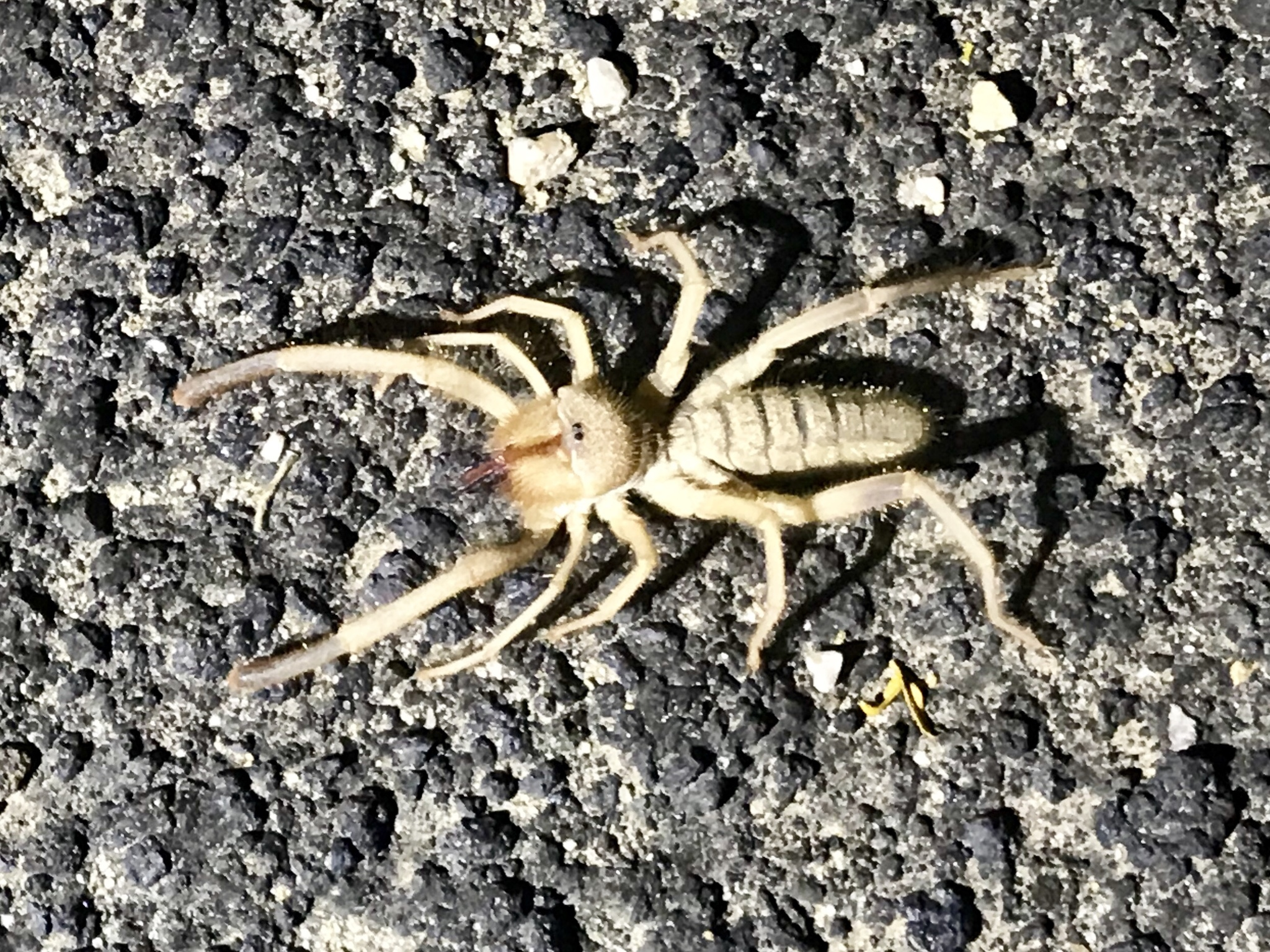
- Eremorhax joshui

Scientific classification
- Domain: Eukaryota
- Kingdom: Animalia
- Phylum: Arthropoda
- Subphylum: Chelicerata
- Class: Arachnida
- Order: Solifugae
- Family: Eremobatidae
- Genus: Eremorhax; Roewer, 1934

Type species
- Eremorhax magnus (Hancock, 1888)

Species
- 10, see text

= Eremorhax =

Genus of camel spiders

Eremorhax is a genus of eremobatid camel spiders, first described by Carl Friedrich Roewer in 1934.

== Species ==
As of February 2023, the World Solifugae Catalog accepts the following ten species:

- Eremorhax arenus (Brookhart and Muma, 1987) — US (California)
- Eremorhax joshui (Brookhart and Muma, 1987) — US (California)
- Eremorhax latus Muma, 1951 — US (Arizona)
- Eremorhax magnellus (Brookhart and Muma, 1987) — US (Arizona, New Mexico)
- Eremorhax magnus (Hancock, 1888) — Mexico, US (New Mexico, Texas)
- Eremorhax mumai Brookhart, 1972 — US (Colorado, New Mexico)
- Eremorhax pimanus (Brookhart and Muma, 1987) — US (Arizona)
- Eremorhax puebloensis Brookhart, 1965 — US (Arizona, Colorado, New Mexico, Texas)
- Eremorhax pulcher Muma, 1963 — US (Arizona, Nevada)
- Eremorhax tuttlei (Brookhart and Muma, 1987) — US (Arizona)
