= Eremothera (plant) =

Scientific classification
- Kingdom: Plantae
- Clade: Tracheophytes
- Clade: Angiosperms
- Clade: Eudicots
- Clade: Rosids
- Order: Myrtales
- Family: Onagraceae
- Subfamily: Onagroideae
- Tribe: Onagreae
- Genus: Eremothera (P.H.Raven) W.L.Wagner & Hoch

Genus of plant

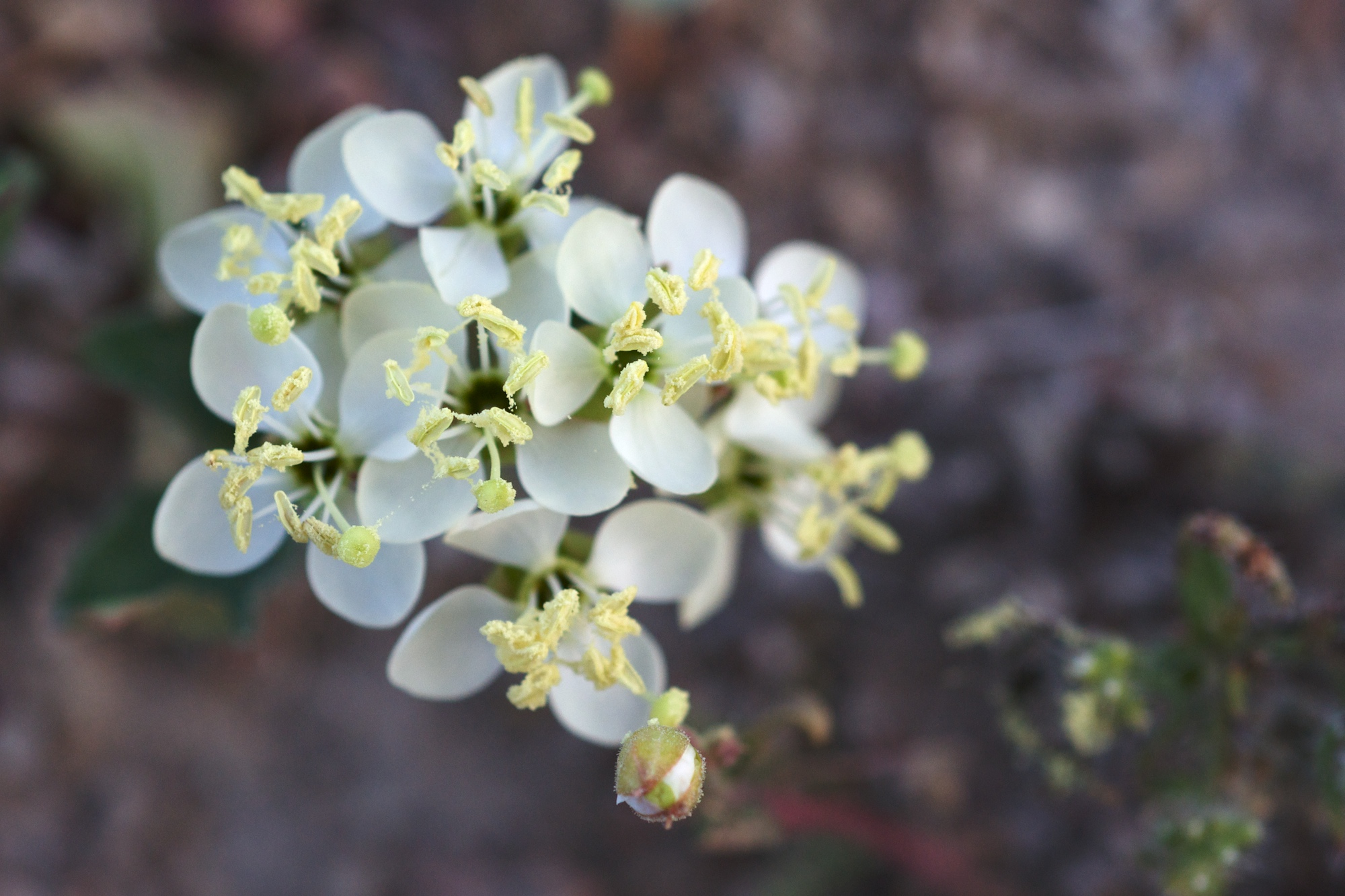
Eremothera boothii

Eremothera is a genus of flowering plants in the family Onagraceae containing 7-12 species (7 species and 5 subspecies), native to Western North America.

Species:

- Eremothera boothii (Douglas) W.L.Wagner & Hoch
  - Eremothera boothii subsp. alyssoides (Hook. & Arn.) W.L.Wagner & Hoch
  - Eremothera boothii subsp. condensata (Munz) W.L.Wagner & Hoch
  - Eremother boothii subsp. decorticans (Hook. & Arn.) W.L.Wagner & Hoch
  - Eremothera boothii subsp. desertorum (Munz) W.L.Wagner & Hoch
  - Eremothera boothii subsp. intermedia (Munz) W.L.Wagner & Hoch
- Eremothera chamaenerioides (A.Gray) W.L.Wagner & Hoch
- Eremothera gouldii (P.H.Raven) W.L.Wagner & Hoch
- Eremothera minor (A.Nelson) W.L.Wagner & Hoch
- Eremothera nevadensis (Kellogg) W.L.Wagner & Hoch
- Eremothera pygmaea (Douglas) W.L.Wagner & Hoch
- Eremothera refracta (S.Watson) W.L.Wagner & Hoch
