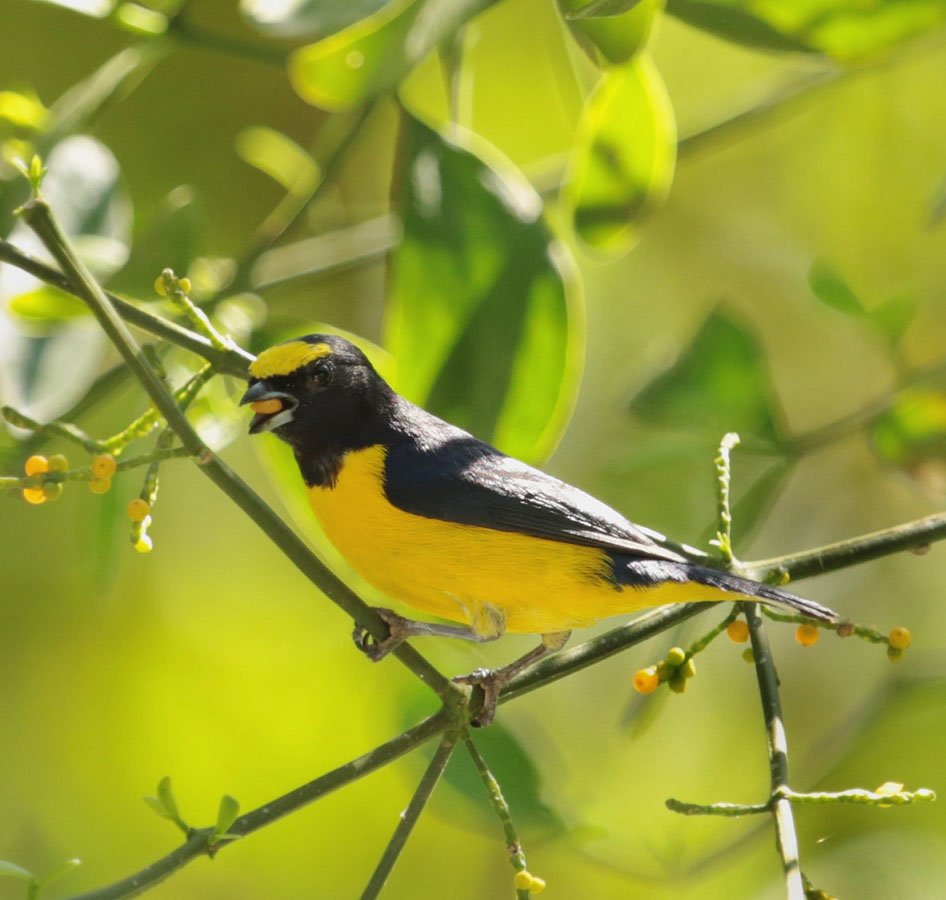

Conservation status
- Least Concern (IUCN 3.1)

Scientific classification
- Kingdom: Animalia
- Phylum: Chordata
- Class: Aves
- Order: Passeriformes
- Family: Fringillidae
- Subfamily: Euphoniinae
- Genus: Euphonia
- Species: E. affinis

Binomial name
- Euphonia affinis (Lesson, 1842)

= Scrub euphonia =

Species of bird

The scrub euphonia (Euphonia affinis) is a species of bird in the family Fringillidae, the finches and euphonias. It is found from Mexico to Costa Rica.

== Taxonomy and systematics ==
The scrub euphonia was originally described in 1842 with the binomial Tanagra (Euphonia) affinis. Genus Tanagra was later subsumed into Euphonia. The genus Euphonia had long placed in the family Thraupidae, the "true" tanagers. Multiple studies in the late twentieth and early twenty-first centuries resulted in its being reassigned to its present place in the family Fringillidae.

The scrub euphonia's further taxonomy is unsettled. Most major taxonomic systems assign it two subspecies, the nominate S. a. affinis (Lesson, 1842) and E. a. olmecorum (Dickerman, 1981). Until 2021 they had included a third subspecies, S. a. godmani (Brewster, 1889). In that year they recognized godmani as a full species, the West Mexican euphonia. However, as of late 2025, BirdLife International's Handbook of the Birds of the World (HBW) retains godmani as a subspecies of the scrub euphonia.

This article follows the two-subspecies model.

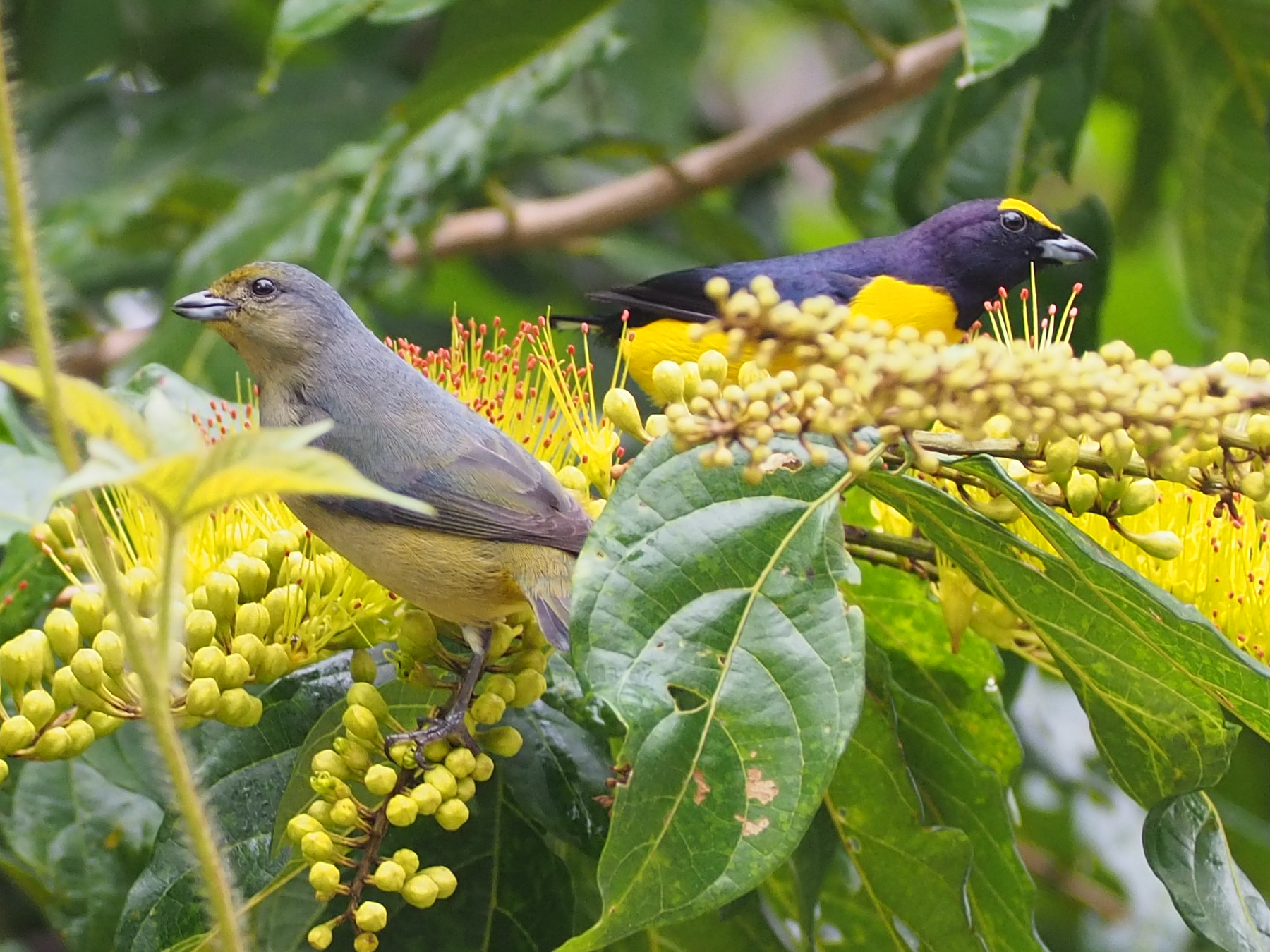
Female (left) and male (right)

== Description ==
The scrub euphonia is about 10 cm (3.9 in) long. It weighs 8.5 to 12.8 g (0.30 to 0.45 oz). It has a short stubby bill. The species is sexually dimorphic. Adult males of the nominate subspecies have a small yellow forecrown; the color extends just to the eye. The rest of their head and nape are glossy blue-black with a purplish sheen. Their upperparts are glossy blue-black. Their tail is mostly blackish with white inner webs on the outer two pairs of feathers. Their upperwing coverts and flight feathers are blackish with some dark blue gloss. Their chin and throat are glossy blue-black with a purplish sheen and their breast, belly, and undertail coverts are bright yellow. Adult females have an olive-yellow forehead, a grayish crown and nape, and an olive-yellow face. Their upperparts, wings, and tail are olive with a gray tinge on the back. Their underparts are mostly olive-yellow with a yellow belly and undertail coverts. Males of subspecies E. a. olmecorum are like the nominate. Females are overall paler than the nominate. Their rump, uppertail coverts, and the edges of their tail feathers are greener. Their underparts are more grayish and their belly a duller yellow. Both sexes of both subspecies have a dark brown iris, a black maxilla with a grayish base, a light bluish gray mandible with a blackish tip, and dark gray legs and feet.

== Distribution and habitat ==
Subspecies E. a. olmecorum is the more northerly of the two. It is found on the Gulf slope of Mexico from Nuevo León, southern Tamaulipas, and eastern San Luis Potosí south to northern Chiapas. The nominate subspecies is found in the east from Mexico's Yucatán Peninsula south through Belize and Guatemala into the western half of Honduras. In the west it is found from western Oaxaca in southwestern Mexico south along the Pacific slope through Guatemala, El Salvador, Honduras, and Nicaragua into northwestern Costa Rica as far as the Tárcoles District in Puntarenas Province.

The scrub euphonia inhabits several somewhat open landscapes in the tropical zone. These include deciduous forest, gallery forest, secondary forest, the edges of evergreen forest, scrublands, agricultural areas and pastures with some trees, gardens, and clearings. Overall it ranges in elevation from sea level to 2,250 m (7,400 ft) but is mostly below 1,000 m (3,300 ft). In northern Central America it is mostly found below 1,300 m (4,300 ft) but reaches 2,200 m (7,200 ft). In Costa Rica it reaches only 1,000 m (3,300 ft).

== Behavior ==
=== Movement ===
The scrub euphonia is generally a resident species but does some local wandering after the breeding season.

=== Feeding ===
The scrub euphonia feeds primarily on the fruits of mistletoe (Loranthaceae) and other small fruits including those of figs (Ficus) and probably cultivated fruits. It also includes small numbers of insects in its diet. It forages mostly in pairs and small groups, often with yellow-throated euphonias (E. hirundinacea), and often joins mixed-species feeding flocks. It forages from trees' mid-level to their canopy.

=== Breeding ===
The scrub euphonia's breeding season varies geographically. In Mexico it includes May but is otherwise not known. It spans from November to April in Costa Rica and in El Salvador is apparently year-round. Both sexes build the nest, a football-shaped structure with a side entrance and made from several kinds of plant fibers lined with fungal fibers. Nests have been found in branch forks between about 3.5 and 8 m (10 and 25 ft) above the ground. There are also at least two records of nests built on human structures. The only described eggs were found in Costa Rica; there the clutch was two to three and the eggs were white to buffy white with reddish brown spots. On record from El Salvador showed an incubation period there of 15 days; only the female incubated. The time to fledging was not recorded but both parents provisioned the nestlings.

=== Vocalization ===
The scrub euphonia's calls include "1–3 pure thin whistles, dee-dee-dee, sometimes followed by 2 or 3 more on [the] same or slightly lower pitch", a "shorter whit-it-it-it", and a "longer wheeee". It sings less than it calls, with "a weak twittering and chirping medley, e.g. wheetidy-titity-witity-titity". Its song and that of the West Mexican euphonia are similar but this species' is slower.

== Status ==
The IUCN follows HBW taxonomy and therefore has included the West Mexican euphonia in its assessment of the scrub euphonia sensu lato. The three-subspecies entity is assessed as being of Least Concern. It has a very large range; its estimated population of at least 500,000 mature individuals is believed to be decreasing. No immediate threats have been identified. Overall it is considered widespread and fairly numerous, and there are several protected areas within its range. It is fairly common in northern Central America and the lowlands of Costa Rica but uncommon in the Costa Rican foothills. "The species thrives also in drier settled or disturbed areas, so long as there are scattered trees and woodlots."
