= Eremothera (arachnid) =

Scientific classification
- Domain: Eukaryota
- Kingdom: Animalia
- Phylum: Arthropoda
- Subphylum: Chelicerata
- Class: Arachnida
- Order: Solifugae
- Family: Eremobatidae
- Subfamily: Eremobatinae
- Genus: Eremothera; Muma, 1951

Type species
- Eremothera sculpturata Muma, 1951

Species
- 2, see text

Genus of camel spiders

Eremothera is a genus of eremobatid camel spiders, first described by Martin Hammond Muma in 1951.

== Species ==
As of February 2023, the World Solifugae Catalog accepts the following two species:

- Eremothera drachmani Muma, 1986 — Mexico
- Eremothera sculpturata Muma, 1951 — Mexico, US (Arizona)
