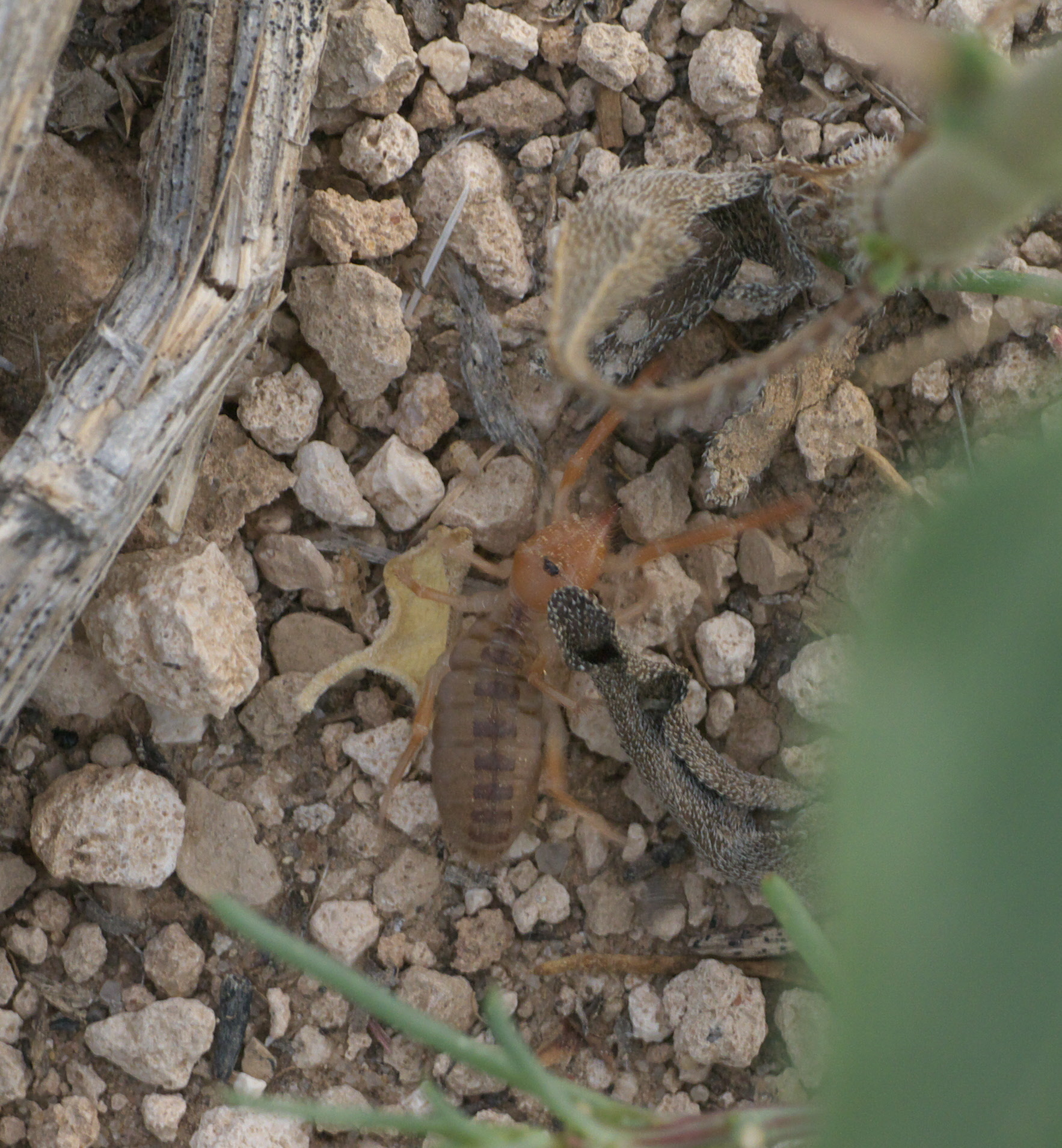

Scientific classification
- Domain: Eukaryota
- Kingdom: Animalia
- Phylum: Arthropoda
- Subphylum: Chelicerata
- Class: Arachnida
- Order: Solifugae
- Family: Eremobatidae
- Subfamily: Therobatinae
- Genus: Hemerotrecha; Banks, 1903

Type species
- Hemerotrecha californica (Banks, 1899)

Species
- 35, see text

= Hemerotrecha =

Genus of camel spiders

Hemerotrecha is a genus of eremobatid camel spiders, first described by Nathan Banks in 1903.

== Species ==
As of February 2023, the World Solifugae Catalog accepts the following thirty-five species:

- Hemerotrecha banksi Muma, 1951 — US (California)
- Hemerotrecha bixleri Muma, 1989 — US (Arizona)
- Hemerotrecha branchi Muma, 1951 — Mexico, US (Arizona, California, Nevada, New Mexico)
- Hemerotrecha californica (Banks, 1899) — US (Arizona, California, Nevada, New Mexico, Oregon)
- Hemerotrecha carsonana Muma, 1989 — US (Nevada)
- Hemerotrecha cazieri Muma, 1986 — Mexico
- Hemerotrecha cornuta Brookhart & Cushing, 2002 — US (Colorado)
- Hemerotrecha delicatula Muma, 1989 — US (Utah)
- Hemerotrecha denticulata Muma, 1951 — Canada (British Columbia), US (California, Colorado, Idaho, Nevada, Utah, Washington)
- Hemerotrecha elpasoensis Muma, 1962 — US (Texas)
- Hemerotrecha fruitana Muma, 1951 — US (California, Colorado, Nevada, New Mexico, Utah, Wyoming)
- Hemerotrecha hanfordana Brookhart & Cushing, 2008 — US (California, Oregon, Utah, Washington)
- Hemerotrecha jacintoana Muma, 1962 — US (California, Nevada)
- Hemerotrecha kaboomi Brookhart & Cushing, 2008 — US (Nevada)
- Hemerotrecha macra Muma, 1951 — US (Oklahoma)
- Hemerotrecha marathoni Muma, 1962 — US (New Mexico, Texas)
- Hemerotrecha marginata (Kraepelin, 1910) — US
- Hemerotrecha maricopana Muma, 1989 — US (Arizona)
- Hemerotrecha milsteadi Muma, 1962 — US (New Mexico, Texas)
- Hemerotrecha minima Muma, 1951 — US (Colorado, Texas)
- Hemerotrecha neotena Muma, 1989 — US (Arizona)
- Hemerotrecha nevadensis Muma, 1951 — US (Nevada)
- Hemerotrecha parva Muma, 1989 — US (Utah)
- Hemerotrecha prenticei Brookhart & Cushing, 2008 — US (California)
- Hemerotrecha proxima Muma, 1963 — US (Nevada)
- Hemerotrecha pseudotruncata Brookhart & Cushing, 2008 — US (California, Nevada)
- Hemerotrecha serrata Muma, 1951 — US (California, Nevada)
- Hemerotrecha sevilleta Brookhart & Cushing, 2002 — US (New Mexico)
- Hemerotrecha simplex Muma, 1951 — US (Arizona, California)
- Hemerotrecha steckleri Muma, 1951 — US (Arizona)
- Hemerotrecha texana Muma, 1951 — US (Texas)
- Hemerotrecha truncata Muma, 1951 — US (California)
- Hemerotrecha vetteri Brookhart & Cushing, 2008 — US (California)
- Hemerotrecha werneri Muma, 1951 — US (Arizona)
- Hemerotrecha xena Banks, 1903 — US (California)
