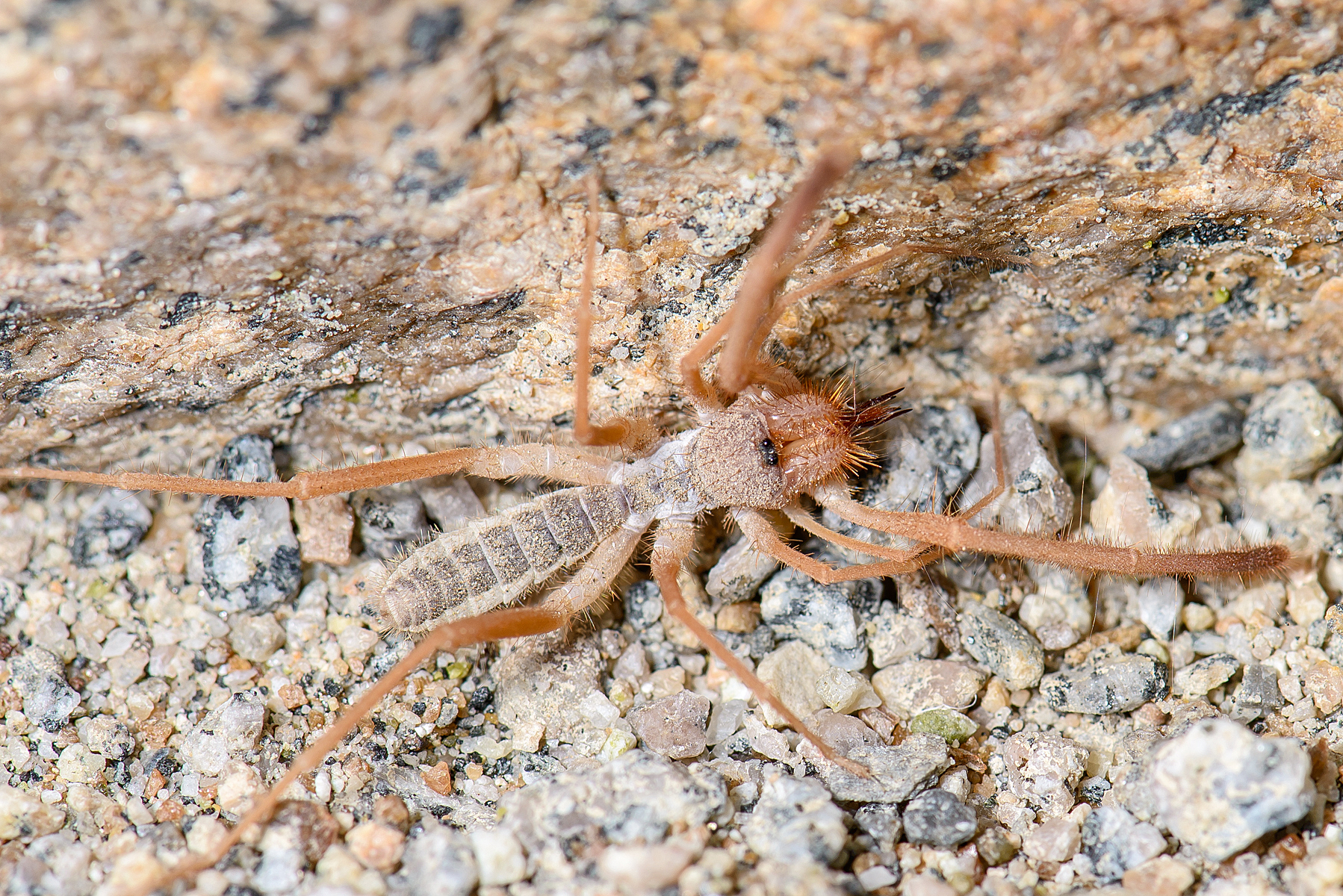
- Male Eremobatidae sp.

Scientific classification
- Kingdom: Animalia
- Phylum: Arthropoda
- Subphylum: Chelicerata
- Class: Arachnida
- Order: Solifugae
- Suborder: Boreosolifugae
- Family: Eremobatidae; Kraepelin, 1901

= Eremobatidae =

Family of spider-like organisms

Eremobatidae is a family of solifuges endemic to North America, first described by Karl Kraepelin in 1901.

== Genera ==
As of October 2022, the World Solifugae Catalog accepts the following eight genera:

- Chanbria Muma, 1951
- Eremobates Banks, 1900
- Eremochelis Roewer, 1934
- Eremocosta Roewer, 1934
- Eremorhax Roewer, 1934
- Eremothera Muma, 1951
- Hemerotrecha Banks, 1903
- Horribates Muma, 1962
