= List of Ammotrechidae species =

This is a list of the described species of the Solifugae family Ammotrechidae. The data is taken from Joel Hallan's Biology Catalog.

== Ammotrechinae ==
Ammotrechinae Roewer, 1934

- Ammotrecha Banks, 1900

- Ammotrecha araucana Mello Leitao, 1942 — Chile
- Ammotrecha chiapasi Muma, 1986 — Mexico
- Ammotrecha cobinensis Muma, 1951 — USA, Mexico
- Ammotrecha friedlaenderi Roewer, 1954 — Brazil
- Ammotrecha itzaana Muma, 1986 — Mexico
- Ammotrecha limbata (Lucas, 1835) — Central America
- Ammotrecha nigrescens Roewer, 1934 — Central America
- Ammotrecha picta Pocock, 1902 — Guatemala
- Ammotrecha stollii (Pocock, 1895) — Central America, USA

- Ammotrechella Roewer, 1934

- Ammotrechella apejii Muma, 1971 — Jamaica
- Ammotrechella bahamica Muma, 1986 — Bahamas
- Ammotrechella bolivari Mello Leitao, 1942 — Mexico
- Ammotrechella bonariensis (Werner, 1925) — Bonaire
- Ammotrechella diaspora Roewer, 1934 — Cape Verde
- Ammotrechella geniculata (C. L. Koch, 1842) — West Indies, northern South America
- Ammotrechella hispaniolana Armas & Alegre, 2001 — Dominican Republic
- Ammotrechella maguirei Muma, 1986 — Turks Caicos
- Ammotrechella pallida Muma & Nezario, 1971 — Puerto Rico
- Ammotrechella pseustes (Chamberlin, 1925) — Panama, California, Puerto Rico
- Ammotrechella setulosa Muma, 1951 — Texas
- Ammotrechella stimpsoni (Putnam, 1883) — Mexico, Florida
- Ammotrechella tabogana Chamberlin, 1919 — Panama

- Ammotrechesta Roewer, 1934

- Ammotrechesta brunnea Roewer, 1934 — Costa Rica
- Ammotrechesta garcetei Armas, 1993 — Nicaragua
- Ammotrechesta maesi Armas, 1993 — Nicaragua
- Ammotrechesta schlueteri Roewer, 1934 — Honduras
- Ammotrechesta tuzi Armas, 2000 — Mexico

- Ammotrechinus Roewer, 1934

- Ammotrechinus gryllipes (Gervais, 1842) — Haiti, Jamaica

- Ammotrechona Roewer, 1934

- Ammotrechona cubae (Lucas, 1835) — Cuba

- Ammotrechula Roewer, 1934

- Ammotrechula boneti Mello Leitao, 1942 — Mexico
- Ammotrechula borregoensis Muma, 1962 — Mexico, USA
- Ammotrechula catalinae Muma, 1989 — Arizona
- Ammotrechula gervaisii (Pocock, 1895) — Colombia, Ecuador
- Ammotrechula lacuna Muma, 1963 — Nevada
- Ammotrechula mulaiki Muma, 1951 — Texas
- Ammotrechula peninsulanus (Banks, 1898)
- Ammotrechula pilosa Muma, 1951 — USA
- Ammotrechula saltatrix (Simon, 1879) — Mexico
- Ammotrechula schusterae Roewer, 1954 — Nicaragua, El Salvador
- Ammotrechula venusta Muma, 1951 — Mexico, Arizona
- Ammotrechula wasbaueri Muma, 1962 — California

- Antillotrecha Armas, 1994

- Antillotrecha fraterna Armas, 1994 — Dominican Republic
- Antillotrecha iviei Armas, 2002 — Leeward Islands

- Campostrecha Mello Leitao, 1937

- Campostrecha felisdens Mello Leitao, 1937 — Ecuador

- Dasycleobis Mello Leitao, 1940

- Dasycleobis crinitus Mello Leitao, 1940 — Argentina

- Neocleobis Roewer, 1934

- Neocleobis solitarius (Banks, 1902) — Galapagos

- Pseudocleobis Pocock, 1900

- Pseudocleobis alticola Pocock, 1900 — South America
- Pseudocleobis andinus (Pocock, 1899) — South America
- Pseudocleobis arequipae Roewer, 1959 — Peru
- Pseudocleobis bardensis Maury, 1976 — Argentina
- Pseudocleobis calchaqui Maury, 1983 — Argentina
- Pseudocleobis chilensis Roewer, 1934 — Chile
- Pseudocleobis hirschmanni Kraepelin, 1911 — Bolivia, Chile
- Pseudocleobis huinca Maury, 1976 — Argentina
- Pseudocleobis ilavea Roewer, 1952 — Peru
- Pseudocleobis levii Maury, 1980 — Argentina
- Pseudocleobis morsicans (Gervais, 1849) — South America
- Pseudocleobis mustersi Maury, 1980 — Argentina
- Pseudocleobis orientalis Maury, 1976 — Argentina
- Pseudocleobis ovicornis Lawrence, 1954 — Peru
- Pseudocleobis peruviana Roewer, 1957 — Peru
- Pseudocleobis puelche Maury, 1976 — Argentina
- Pseudocleobis solitarius Maury, 1976 — Argentina
- Pseudocleobis tarmana Roewer, 1952 — Peru
- Pseudocleobis titschacki (Roewer, 1942) — Peru
- Pseudocleobis truncatus Maury, 1976 — Argentina

== Mortolinae ==
Mortolinae Mello-Leitão, 1938

- Mortola Mello Leitao, 1938

- Mortola mortola Mello Leitao, 1938 — Argentina

== Nothopuginae ==
Nothopuginae Maury, 1976

- Nothopuga Maury, 1976

- Nothopuga cuyana Maury, 1976 — Argentina
- Nothopuga lobera Maury, 1976 — Argentina

== Oltacolinae ==
Oltacolinae Rower, 1934

- Oltacola Roewer, 1934

- Oltacola chacoensis Roewer, 1934 — Argentina
- Oltacola goetschi Lawatsch, in Goetsch & Lawatsch 1944 — Argentina
- Oltacola gomezi Roewer, 1934 — Argentina
- Oltacola mendocina Mello Leitao, 1938 — Argentina

== Saronominae ==
Saronominae Roewer, 1954

- Branchia Muma, 1951

- Branchia angustus Muma, 1951 — Mexico, USA
- Branchia brevis Muma, 1951 — Texas
- Branchia potens Muma, 1951 — Mexico, USA

- Chinchippus Chamberlin, 1920

- Chinchippus peruvianus Chamberlin, 1920 — Peru

- Innesa Roewer, 1934

- Innesa vittata (Pocock, 1902) — Guatemala

- Procleobis Kraepelin, 1899

- Procleobis patagonicus (Holmberg, 1876) — Argentina

- Saronomus Kraepelin, 1900

- Saronomus capensis (Kraepelin, 1899) — Colombia, Venezuela

== incertae sedis ==
- Chileotrecha Maury, 1987

- Chileotrecha atacamensis Maury, 1987 — Chile

- Eutrecha Maury, 1982

- Eutrecha longirostris Maury, 1982 — Venezuela

- † Happlodontus Poinar & Santiago-Blay, 1989

- Happlodontus proterus Poinar & Samtiago Blay, 1989 — Fossil: miocene amber

- Xenotrecha Maury, 1982

- Xenotrecha huebneri (Kraepelin, 1899) — Venezuela
