= Xenotrecha =

Scientific classification
- Kingdom: Animalia
- Phylum: Arthropoda
- Subphylum: Chelicerata
- Class: Arachnida
- Order: Solifugae
- Family: Ammotrechidae
- Genus: Xenotrecha; Maury, 1982
- Species: X. huebneri

Binomial name
- Xenotrecha huebneri (Kraepelin, 1899)

Genus of camel spiders

Xenotrecha is a monotypic genus of ammotrechid camel spiders, containing the species Xenotrecha huebneri.

== Etymology ==
The first description of this species was of a female specimen, collected by and named after Georg Hübner, and examined by Karl Kraepelin in 1899. The first male was described by Emilio Antonio Maury in 1982. This species is very elusive and their evolutionary relationship to other species and genera are still widely unclassified and unexplored. As of 2023, it is thought that they are closely related to Eutrecha and other species within the family Ammotrechinae, Ammotrecha.

X. huebneri is not the only species with the common name "camel spider". This name has been given, generally, to the whole order of Solifugae. Camel spiders get their name from a historical misconception that they burrow into the stomachs of camels. It is now known that camel spiders are typically not aggressive towards large mammals unless in self-defense after being provoked.

Karl Kraepelin was a German naturalist who wrote a piece in "Messages from the Natural History Museum in Hamburg XVI. Vintage 1898 1899" on his research about X. huebneri. His publication is one of the only existing, reliable publications on the huebneri camel spider. More modern research, including behavioural, morphological, and molecular studies are needed for this species. Originally written in German, a copy of this book is available in the Biodiversity Heritage Library where X. huebneri, "2. C. hubneri n. sp." is found on from page 239–240. Kraepelin wrote his findings based on one female specimen, the first specimen found and one of the only few known to this day, that was collected by its nameske, Georg Hubner.

== Taxonomy ==
The retroventral spiniform seta is important for taxonomic and phylogenetic purposes in the relationships between Saronomus capensis and groups within Ammotrechinae (including Xenotrecha). This seta is located on legs II and III on the distal telotarsus segment. The absence of this trait is a commonality among the Ammotrechinae, which include Xenotrecha, Eutrecha, and Ammotrecha.

Eutrecha and Xenotrecha have been placed into the family Ammotrechinae after revisions of the qualifications have been occurring as of 2023. Traditionally, Ammotrechinae has had a handful of shared traits, including, but not limited to:

- Legs II and III do not have dorsal apical spiniform seta, but do have them ventrally
- Telotarsi of leg IV has 3 segments, whereas legs I-III have one segment
- The first (basal) segment of the telotarsus on leg IV is the longest in length
  - The first segment has two pairs of spiniform setae on the ventral side
  - The second segment on this leg is often more broad than long and has a ventral pair of spiniform setae
  - The third segment, the distal segment, is shorter than the first segment

Xenotrecha and two other species do not fit into all of these characteristics. Specifically, they tend to not have the single segment on the telotarsi of legs II and III. It has been highlighted in literature that these characteristics need to be revised in order to accommodate for the three species, including Xenotrecha, as taxonomists are more confident that these species should be in the Ammotrecha family.

== Distribution & Habitat ==
This camel spider is a single species, Xenotrecha huebneri, that is distributed in Brazil, Argentina, Columbia, and Venezuela. It lives in tropical and temperate desert regions of these countries. In Brazil, it has been noted that X. huebneri tends to occur most often in habitats with dense vegetation. Some environments that they have been found in include grasslands and rocky outcrops. This can be seen in areas such as Serra do Tepequem, Roraima State, Brazil. So far, their confirmed range is approximately 900 km between Brazil, Suriname, and Venezuela.

== Behaviour & Diet ==
Being in the order Solifugae, X. huebneri are nocturnal. They are generalist predators of primarily arthropods, along with lizards, birds, and small mammals. Camel spiders in general are regarded as one of the top predators in desert habitats, next to scorpions. They tend to be active, aggressive hunters who will search for prey, in contrast to true spiders who are more ambush-style predators. Camel spiders are typically predated on by scorpions, toads, and bats. They are usually not venomous or harmful to humans, but their bites can be painful. More research is needed to confirm if this is also true in Xenotrecha specifically.

X. huebneri has a structure that appears to be plumose seta, which is discussed under "Body Components & Taxonomic Identifiers". The true function of this organ is currently unknown, however, it is speculated that males may use it in their mating behaviours. This structure may be used by males during courtship rituals, such as stimulating the female or cleaning gentials.

== Morphology & Diagnostic Characteristics ==
Size (mm)
| Measurement | Female | Male |
|---|---|---|
| Total length | 14.40 | 17.15 |
| Chelicer length | 2.75 | 3.71 |
| Chelicer height | 0.96 | 1.22 |
| Propeltidium length | 2.18 | 2.94 |
| Propeltidium width | 2.50 | 3.07 |
| Pedipalp length | 7.10 | 12.92 |

More specific and detailed measurements from 2023 of the physical body of only male X. huebneri can be found in the Arthropod Systematics & Phylogeny journal, including measurements of various leg and body segments. A general description of Solifugae (camel spider) anatomy, including the structures discussed in this article, can be found on the Solifugae Wikipage. As seen from the measurements, the known males are larger than the known females, however, due to the small sample size more research and collection of specimens is required.

=== Body Components & Taxonomic Identifiers ===
The body of X. huebneri is covered by a prosomal dorsal shield, also called a peltidium or carapace. It is made of 3 distinct parts. The Propeltidium is the portion where the eyes, chelicerae, pedipalps, and 2 pairs of legs are located. the Mesopeltidium contains the third pair of legs, and the Metapeltidium contains the fourth pair. The name "camel spider" also comes from the arch-shape plate on their body, similar to that of a camel's hump.

Very few individuals of this species have been found and examined, most of which are female. For the females, the following has been described as general characteristics:

The upper jaw has a yellow-brown colour with two longitudinal stripes of a burnt-like colour. The cephalothorax was described to have angular decals with a light faint median line. The rings and dorsal plate of the thorax are a "chestnut brown" colour, but sometimes (altbeit rarely) a grey-yellow colour. The eyes are noted to be very close together. The maxillary palps (maxilla) are a darker colour at the base than the tips, and the ends of the protarsus are yellow. The dorsal maxillary "finger" is curved and typically covered. The part of the mouth that bears teeth was "noticeably short", where the "intermediate tooth", third in the front, was so small that it was not visible externally. The main tooth is visible from the outside and is joint with the second front tooth. The examined specimen lacked any bristles on the "protarsus" and the "tibia of the palps". The terminology here is unclear due to language barriers, however, "protarsus" may indicate pretarsus, and in this context the first segment of the maxillary palps; and "tibia of the palps" may indicate the fourth segment of the maxillary palps. The "truncus" [trunk] length was 12.5mm.

This species was thought, based on morphology, to be closely related to two species, Cleobis gervaisi and Cleobis limbata, who may have had a revision on its binomial name since 1899. This relation is due to the row of 5 spines on the ventral side of the "protarsus".

A recognizable characteristic to distinguish this species from other similar species is the very bright end-half of the "protarsus" of the maxillary palp, with the rest of the structure being dark. Another characteristic to distinguish X. huebneri from other Solifuge taxa is the plumose setiform organ on its flagellum. New research has shown that this structure is actually part of the flagellar base that has a convergently-evolved morphology to appear similar to that of plumose seta.

=== Chelicerae ===
The chelicerae are functionally jaw-equivalents, and can be also used for stridulation. Stridulation is when the parts are rubbed together to produce sound. Chelicerae are one of the most distinctive features of the order Solifugae. X. huebneri's defining characteristics include a retroventral longitudinal carina on the chelicerae's movable finger; and a basal cleavage plane on the pedipalp femur. In females, the moveable finger of the chelicera, a common component of this structure, has a prolaterla tooth which is distinctive. On the distag segments of the telotarsus of the II and III legs, they lack any retroventral spiniform setae.

=== Flagellum & Seta Continued ===
Kraepelin (1908) hypothesized that the flagellum was two satae that became fused into one structure. This was supported by Maury (1982), who described a plumose seta at the center of the flagellum which extended to the flagellum's tip. The base of this seta was noted to be broader than similar structures in other species. Roewer (1934) displayed that the precursor of the flagellum in a closely related species was a single differentiated seta, which does not support Kraepelin's hypothesis. Kraepelin's hypothesis has only been shown in X. huebneri. This structure has only been described on one of the few examined specimens. Due to this, this structure cannot be disregarded in literature as an abnormality, and must be considered as potentially being a defining trait.

The "Setal Transformation Hypotheses" are a series of hypotheses by various researchers on the potential transformation of the seta to a flagellum. Lamoral (1975) performed histological studies that indicated that the flagellum's alembic lumen is lined by epicuticle. This may have occurred after a longitudinal invagination of the seta. Other hypotheses do not apply directly to X. huebneri.

== Life History & Importance of Community Science ==
Currently, not much is known about the life history of these organisms. There is speculation about some of their behaviours, such as in mating. Specifics of Xenotrecha are unknown within the life history traits of mating, however some trends are found to be common amongst camel spiders. This includes males using pedipalps to entice the female into mating. In some species, males insert the sperm directly into the female, and in others, the male will transfer the sperm using its chelicerae. Female camel spiders tend to use burrows to brood their eggs, and can have a clutch size of 50-200 eggs depending on the species. Some species have been found to show parental care from the female in terms of protecting eggs from predators. After hatching, eggs undergo metamorphosis, where each stage is called a "nymphal instar". Some camel spider species can have up to 10 nymphal instar stages, and independent hunting has been seen to begin as early as the second nymphal instar stage. Xenotrecha can be reasonably expected to follow similar trends, however the specific details need to be researched further.

X. huebneri individuals are very elusive and hard to come by, and most of what has been researched is still their physiology and trying to figure out where they fit into the Tree of Life. Basic information is available, such as them being nocturnal and generalist predators. The lack of knowledge of their life history creates the need for more research to understand this species of camel spiders. Community science is a major tool that can be useful for finding out more about this species. Some online databases have records of X. huebneri, including Global Biodiversity Information Facility, GBIF, which as of March 2024 has 9 occurrences recorded. iNaturalist is another community science website that has the opportunity to help advance research on Xenotrecha, however, only three observations seem to be recorded of this species on the entire platform, all of which are from Eduador. Ecuador is not currently a location that has been formally acknowledged as being within the range of Xenotrecha huebneri, highlighting the opportunities presented by community science.

== Genetic Information ==
No genetic information is currently publicly available for Xenotrecha huebneri. The National Center for Biotechnology Information's (NCBI) GenBank has no records of this species as of March 2024. Other genetic databases such as Genomenon also have no record of them. This is another gap in knowledge surrounding this species that needs to be filled in order to have a holoistic understanding of this species.

== Cultural & Ecological Importance ==
Many organisms that are not acknowledged as important in the scientific community are important to local people, especially indigenous people, and cultures. They can have a rich history within the local community but be widely overlooked by western science. A similar phenomenon occurs with organisms within their role in an ecological community. Many organisms, especially smaller and harder to find organisms such as Xenotrecha, are easily overlooked in favour of larger and more "interesting" organisms. It is important to acknowledge these biases when performing research as both a scientist and as a citizen. Xenotrecha's near invisibility within the scientific community and literature does not mean that local peoples are also relatively unaware of them. The same goes for their role in the ecosystem. People may not yet fully understand the role of this organism in the environment, but that does not mean that it can't play an important one. Knowledge gaps such as these make it even more critical for further research to be done, both within the scientific community and local communities. Although small in size, their impact on the ecosystem around them could be profound after accounting situations such as trophic cascades.
