= Branchia =

Branchia may refer to:

- Branchia, a gill or similar organ of respiration.
- Branchia (arachnid), a genus of arthropods.
