= Sedna pirata =

Scientific classification
- Kingdom: Animalia
- Phylum: Arthropoda
- Subphylum: Chelicerata
- Class: Arachnida
- Order: Solifugae
- Family: Ammotrechidae
- Genus: Sedna; Muma, 1971
- Species: S. pirata

Binomial name
- Sedna pirata Muma, 1971

Species of camel spider

Sedna is a monotypic genus of ammotrechid camel spiders, first described by Martin Hammond Muma in 1971. Its single species, Sedna pirata is distributed in Chile.
