= Mummuciona =

Scientific classification
- Domain: Eukaryota
- Kingdom: Animalia
- Phylum: Arthropoda
- Subphylum: Chelicerata
- Class: Arachnida
- Order: Solifugae
- Family: Ammotrechidae
- Genus: Mummuciona; Roewer, 1934
- Species: M. simoni

Binomial name
- Mummuciona simoni Roewer, 1934

Genus of camel spiders

Mummuciona is a monotypic genus of ammotrechid camel spiders, first described by Carl Friedrich Roewer in 1934. Its single species, Mummuciona simoni is distributed in Colombia and Venezuela.
