= Titanopuga =

Scientific classification
- Kingdom: Animalia
- Phylum: Arthropoda
- Subphylum: Chelicerata
- Class: Arachnida
- Order: Solifugae
- Family: Ammotrechidae
- Genus: Titanopuga; Iuri, 2021
- Species: T. salinarum

Binomial name
- Titanopuga salinarum Iuri, 2021

Genus of camel spiders

Titanopuga is a monotypic genus of ammotrechid camel spiders, first described by Hernán Iuri in 2021. Its single species, Titanopuga salinarum is distributed in Argentina.
