= Ammotrechella stimpsoni =

Scientific classification
- Domain: Eukaryota
- Kingdom: Animalia
- Phylum: Arthropoda
- Subphylum: Chelicerata
- Class: Arachnida
- Order: Solifugae
- Family: Ammotrechidae
- Genus: Ammotrechella
- Species: A. stimpsoni

Binomial name
- Ammotrechella stimpsoni (Putnam, 1883)

Species of spider-like animal

Ammotrechella stimpsoni is a species of curve-faced solifugid in the family Ammotrechidae.
