= Cuyanopuga =

Scientific classification
- Kingdom: Animalia
- Phylum: Arthropoda
- Subphylum: Chelicerata
- Class: Arachnida
- Order: Solifugae
- Family: Ammotrechidae
- Genus: Cuyanopuga; Iuri, 2021
- Species: C. bilobata

Binomial name
- Cuyanopuga bilobata Iuri, 2021

Genus of camel spiders

Cuyanopuga is a monotypic genus of ammotrechid camel spiders, first described by Hernán Iuri in 2021. Its single species, Cuyanopuga bilobata is distributed in Argentina.
