= Ammotrechesta =

Scientific classification
- Domain: Eukaryota
- Kingdom: Animalia
- Phylum: Arthropoda
- Subphylum: Chelicerata
- Class: Arachnida
- Order: Solifugae
- Family: Ammotrechidae
- Genus: Ammotrechesta; Roewer, 1934

Type species
- Ammotrechesta schlueteri Roewer, 1934

Species
- 5, see text

Genus of camel spiders

Ammotrechesta is a genus of ammotrechid camel spiders, first described by Carl Friedrich Roewer in 1934.

== Species ==
As of October 2022, the World Solifugae Catalog accepts the following five species:

- Ammotrechesta brunnea Roewer, 1934 — Costa Rica
- Ammotrechesta garcetei Armas, 1993 — Nicaragua
- Ammotrechesta maesi Armas, 1993 — Nicaragua
- Ammotrechesta schlueteri Roewer, 1934 — Honduras
- Ammotrechesta tuzi Armas, 2000 — Mexico
