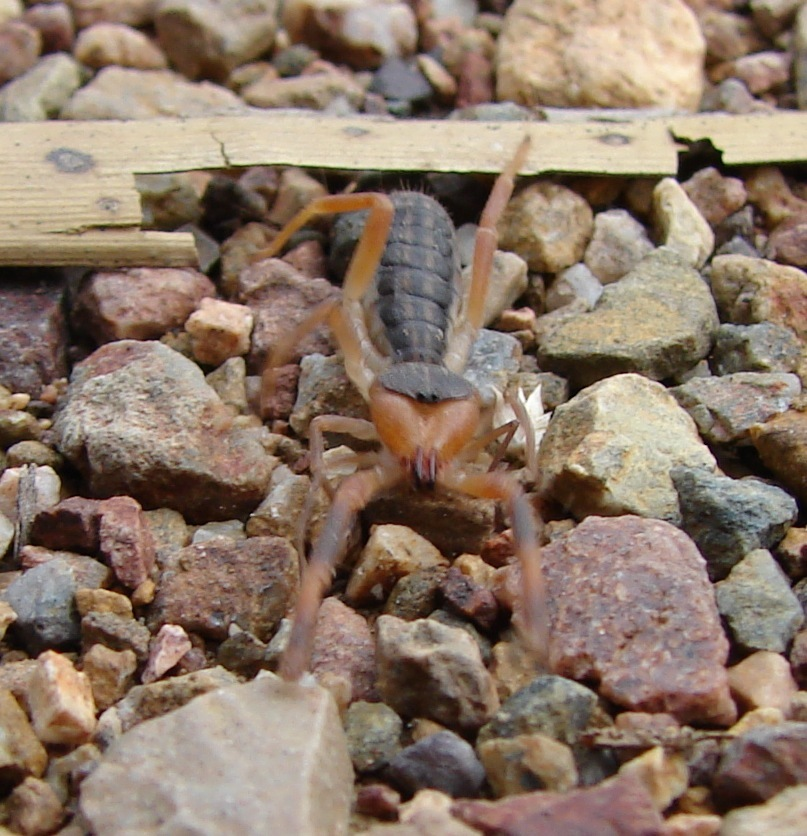
- Ammotrechula boneti

Scientific classification
- Kingdom: Animalia
- Phylum: Arthropoda
- Subphylum: Chelicerata
- Class: Arachnida
- Order: Solifugae
- Family: Ammotrechidae
- Genus: Ammotrechula; Roewer, 1934

Type species
- Ammotrechula saltatrix (Simon, 1879)

Species
- 12, see text

= Ammotrechula =

Genus of camel spiders

Ammotrechula is a genus of ammotrechid camel spiders, first described by Carl Friedrich Roewer in 1934.

== Species ==
As of October 2022, the World Solifugae Catalog accepts the following twelve species:

- Ammotrechula boneti Mello-Leitão, 1942 — Mexico
- Ammotrechula borregoensis Muma, 1962 — Mexico, US (California, Nevada)
- Ammotrechula catalinae Muma, 1989 — US (Arizona)
- Ammotrechula gervaisii (Pocock, 1895) — Colombia, Ecuador (mainland)
- Ammotrechula lacuna Muma, 1963 — US (Nevada)
- Ammotrechula mulaiki Muma, 1951 — Mexico, US (Texas)
- Ammotrechula peninsulana (Banks, 1898) — Mexico, US (Arizona, New Mexico, Texas)
- Ammotrechula pilosa Muma, 1951 — US (Arizona, California, Nevada, Texas)
- Ammotrechula saltatrix (Simon, 1879) — Mexico
- Ammotrechula schusterae Roewer, 1954 — El Salvador, Nicaragua
- Ammotrechula venusta Muma, 1951 — Mexico, US (Arizona)
- Ammotrechula wasbaueri Muma, 1962 — US (California)
