= Antillotrecha =

Scientific classification
- Domain: Eukaryota
- Kingdom: Animalia
- Phylum: Arthropoda
- Subphylum: Chelicerata
- Class: Arachnida
- Order: Solifugae
- Family: Ammotrechidae
- Genus: Antillotrecha; Armas, 1994

Type species
- Antillotrecha fraterna Armas, 1994

Species
- 4, see text

Genus of camel spiders

Antillotrecha is a genus of ammotrechid camel spiders, first described by Luis de Armas in 1994.

== Species ==
As of October 2022, the World Solifugae Catalog accepts the following four species:

- Antillotrecha disjunctodens Armas & Teruel, 2005 — Cuba
- Antillotrecha fraterna Armas, 1994 — Dominican Republic
- Antillotrecha guama Armas & Teruel, 2005 — Cuba
- Antillotrecha iviei Armas, 2002 — Anguilla
