= Ammotrechella =

Scientific classification
- Domain: Eukaryota
- Kingdom: Animalia
- Phylum: Arthropoda
- Subphylum: Chelicerata
- Class: Arachnida
- Order: Solifugae
- Family: Ammotrechidae
- Subfamily: Ammotrechinae
- Genus: Ammotrechella; Roewer, 1934

Type species
- Ammotrechella geniculata (C.L. Koch, 1842)

Species
- 15, see text

Genus of camel spiders

Ammotrechella is a genus of ammotrechid camel spiders, first described by Carl Friedrich Roewer in 1934.

== Species ==
As of October 2022, the World Solifugae Catalog accepts the following fifteen species:

- Ammotrechella apejii Muma, 1971 — Jamaica
- Ammotrechella bahamica Muma, 1986 — Bahamas
- Ammotrechella bolivari Mello-Leitão, 1942 — Mexico
- Ammotrechella bonariensis (Werner, 1925) — Bonaire
- Ammotrechella cubae (Lucas, 1835) — Cuba
- Ammotrechella diaspora Roewer, 1934 — Cape Verde
- Ammotrechella geniculata (C.L. Koch, 1842) — Bahamas, Cape Verde, Colombia, Curaçao, Ecuador, Guadeloupe, St. Vincent and Grenadines, Venezuela
- Ammotrechella hispaniolana Armas & Alegre, 2001 — Dominican Republic
- Ammotrechella jutisi Armas & Teruel, 2005 — Cuba
- Ammotrechella maguirei Muma, 1986 — Turks and Caicos Islands
- Ammotrechella pallida Muma & Nezario, 1971 — Puerto Rico
- Ammotrechella pseustes (Chamberlin, 1925) — Panama, Puerto Rico, US (California)
- Ammotrechella setulosa Muma, 1951 — US (Texas)
- Ammotrechella stimpsoni (Putnam, 1883) — Mexico, US (Florida)
- Ammotrechella tabogana (Chamberlin, 1919) — Panama
