= Dasycleobis =

Scientific classification
- Domain: Eukaryota
- Kingdom: Animalia
- Phylum: Arthropoda
- Subphylum: Chelicerata
- Class: Arachnida
- Order: Solifugae
- Family: Ammotrechidae
- Genus: Dasycleobis; Mello-Leitão, 1940
- Species: D. crinitus

Binomial name
- Dasycleobis crinitus Mello-Leitão, 1940

Genus of camel spiders

Dasycleobis is a monotypic genus of ammotrechid camel spiders, first described by Cândido Firmino de Mello-Leitão in 1940. Its single species, Dasycleobis crinitus is distributed in Argentina.
