= Procleobis =

Scientific classification
- Domain: Eukaryota
- Kingdom: Animalia
- Phylum: Arthropoda
- Subphylum: Chelicerata
- Class: Arachnida
- Order: Solifugae
- Family: Ammotrechidae
- Genus: Procleobis; Kraepelin, 1899
- Species: P. patagonicus

Binomial name
- Procleobis patagonicus (Holmberg, 1876)

Genus of camel spiders

Procleobis is a monotypic genus of ammotrechid camel spiders, first described by Karl Kraepelin in 1899. Its single species, Procleobis patagonicus is distributed in Argentina.
