= Chileotrecha =

Scientific classification
- Domain: Eukaryota
- Kingdom: Animalia
- Phylum: Arthropoda
- Subphylum: Chelicerata
- Class: Arachnida
- Order: Solifugae
- Family: Ammotrechidae
- Genus: Chileotrecha; Maury, 1987
- Species: C. atacamensis

Binomial name
- Chileotrecha atacamensis Maury, 1987

Genus of camel spiders

Chileotrecha is a monotypic genus of ammotrechid camel spiders, first described by Emilio Antonio Maury in 1987. Its single species, Chileotrecha atacamensis is distributed in Chile.
