= Campostrecha =

Scientific classification
- Domain: Eukaryota
- Kingdom: Animalia
- Phylum: Arthropoda
- Subphylum: Chelicerata
- Class: Arachnida
- Order: Solifugae
- Family: Ammotrechidae
- Genus: Campostrecha; Mello-Leitão, 1937
- Species: C. felisdens

Binomial name
- Campostrecha felisdens Mello-Leitão, 1937

Genus of camel spiders

Campostrecha is a monotypic genus of ammotrechid camel spiders, first described by Cândido Firmino de Mello-Leitão in 1937. Its single species, Campostrecha felisdens is distributed in Ecuador.
