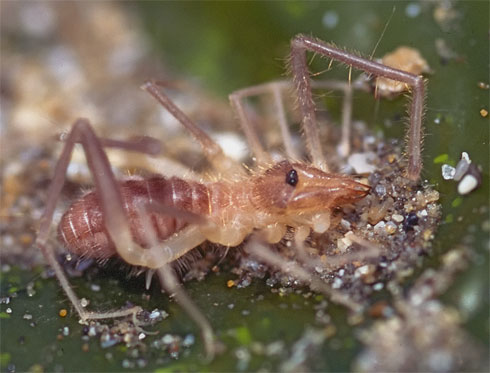
- Chinchippus peruvianus

Scientific classification
- Kingdom: Animalia
- Phylum: Arthropoda
- Subphylum: Chelicerata
- Class: Arachnida
- Order: Solifugae
- Family: Ammotrechidae
- Genus: Chinchippus; Chamberlin, 1920

Type species
- Chinchippus peruvianus Chamberlin, 1920

Species
- 2, see text

= Chinchippus =

Genus of camel spiders

Chinchippus is a genus of ammotrechid camel spiders, first described by Ralph Vary Chamberlin in 1920.

== Species ==
As of October 2022, the World Solifugae Catalog accepts the following two species:

- Chinchippus peruvianus Chamberlin, 1920 — Peru
- Chinchippus viejaensis Catenazzi, Brookhart & Cushing, 2009 — Peru
