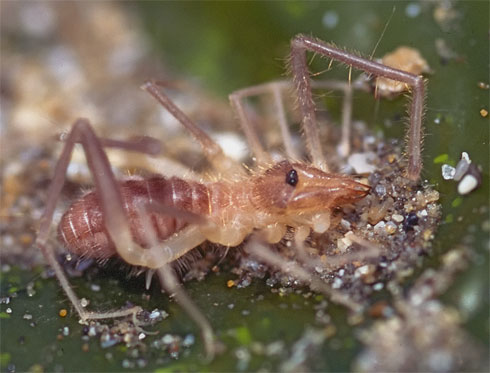
- Chinchippus peruvianus

Scientific classification
- Kingdom: Animalia
- Phylum: Arthropoda
- Subphylum: Chelicerata
- Class: Arachnida
- Order: Solifugae
- Family: Ammotrechidae; Roewer, 1934

Genera
- See text.

Diversity
- 26 genera, 95 species

= Ammotrechidae =

Ammotrechidae Temporal range: Miocene–recent

Family of arachnids

Ammotrechidae is a family of solifuges distributed in the Americas and the Caribbean Islands. It includes 26 described genera and 95 species. Members of this family can be distinguished from members of other families by the absence of claws on tarsi of leg I, tarsal segmentation 1-2-2-(2-4), pedipalps with pairs of lateroventral spines, and by males having an immovable flagellum on the mesal face of each chelicerum. The propeltidium of the Ammotrechidae is recurved.

The common names used for Ammotrechidae are curve-faced solifugids and sand runners. They live in arid regions, such as dune and rocky habitats. They are carnivores which feed mainly on other invertebrates. Ammotrechidae have relatively high metabolic rates, which allow them to be voracious predators. They feed by masticating their prey and sucking out the liquids. They are preyed upon by other vertebrates. Species of Ammotrechidae are found to be cannibalistic. Males and females dig shallow burrows for protection and nesting.

The species in North America are found in the South to Southwest and are rarely longer than 2 inches. Though they can be pests, they are considered beneficial because they feed on scorpions, spiders, and termites.

== Genera ==
As of September 2022, the World Solifugae Catalog accepts the following twenty-six genera:

- Ammotrecha Banks, 1900
- Ammotrechella Roewer, 1934
- Ammotrechesta Roewer, 1934
- Ammotrechinus Roewer, 1934
- Ammotrechula Roewer, 1934
- Antillotrecha Armas, 1994
- Branchia Muma, 1951
- Campostrecha Mello-Leitão, 1937
- Chileotrecha Maury, 1987
- Chinchippus Chamberlin, 1920
- Cuyanopuga Iuri, 2021
- Dasycleobis Mello-Leitão, 1940
- Eutrecha Maury, 1982
- Innesa Roewer, 1934
- Mortola Mello-Leitão, 1938
- Mummuciona Roewer, 1934
- Neocleobis Roewer, 1934
- Nothopuga Maury, 1976
- Oltacola Roewer, 1934
- Procleobis Kraepelin, 1899
- Pseudocleobis Pocock, 1900
- Saronomus Kraepelin, 1900
- Sedna Muma, 1971
- Titanopuga Iuri, 2021
- Xenotrecha Maury, 1982
- †Happlodontus Poinar & Santiago-Blay, 1989
