= Branchia (arachnid) =

Scientific classification
- Domain: Eukaryota
- Kingdom: Animalia
- Phylum: Arthropoda
- Subphylum: Chelicerata
- Class: Arachnida
- Order: Solifugae
- Family: Ammotrechidae
- Genus: Branchia; Muma, 1951

Type species
- Branchia angustus Muma, 1951

Species
- 3, see text

Genus of camel spiders

Branchia is a genus of ammotrechid camel spiders, first described by Martin Hammond Muma in 1951.

== Species ==
As of October 2022, the World Solifugae Catalog accepts the following three species:

- Branchia angustus Muma, 1951 — US (Arizona, California)
- Branchia brevis Muma, 1951 — US (Arizona, Texas)
- Branchia potens Muma, 1951 — Mexico, US (California, Nevada, Utah)
