= Oltacola =

Scientific classification
- Kingdom: Animalia
- Phylum: Arthropoda
- Subphylum: Chelicerata
- Class: Arachnida
- Order: Solifugae
- Family: Ammotrechidae
- Genus: Oltacola; Roewer, 1934

Type species
- Oltacola gomezi Roewer, 1934

Species
- 4, see text

Genus of camel spiders

Oltacola is a genus of ammotrechid camel spiders (which are not spiders), first described by Carl Friedrich Roewer in 1934.

== Species ==
As of October 2022, the World Solifugae Catalog accepts the following four species:

- Oltacola chacoensis Roewer, 1934 — Argentina
- Oltacola goetschi Lawatsch, 1944 — Argentina
- Oltacola gomezi Roewer, 1934 — Argentina
- Oltacola mendocina Mello-Leitão, 1938 — Argentina
