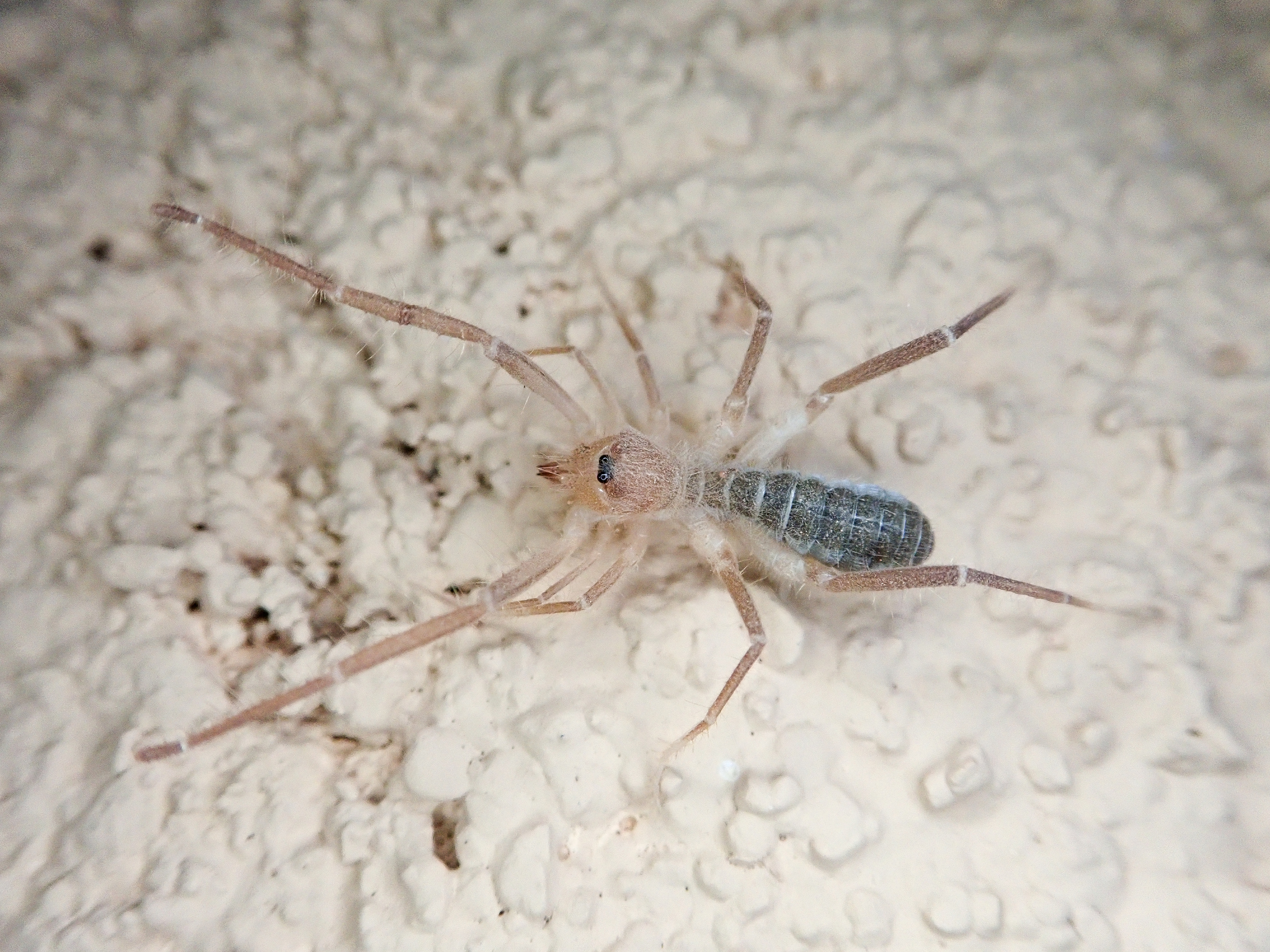
- Nothopuga telteca

Scientific classification
- Domain: Eukaryota
- Kingdom: Animalia
- Phylum: Arthropoda
- Subphylum: Chelicerata
- Class: Arachnida
- Order: Solifugae
- Family: Ammotrechidae
- Genus: Nothopuga; Maury, 1976

Type species
- Nothopuga lobera Maury, 1976

Species
- 3, see text

= Nothopuga =

Genus of camel spiders

Nothopuga is a genus of ammotrechid camel spiders, first described by Emilio Antonio Maury in 1976.

== Species ==
As of October 2022, the World Solifugae Catalog accepts the following three species:

- Nothopuga cuyana Maury, 1976 — Argentina
- Nothopuga lobera Maury, 1976 — Argentina
- Nothopuga telteca Iuri, 2021 — Argentina
