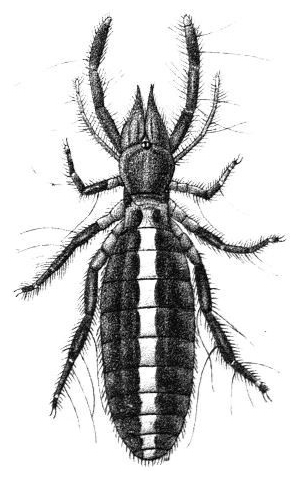

Scientific classification
- Domain: Eukaryota
- Kingdom: Animalia
- Phylum: Arthropoda
- Subphylum: Chelicerata
- Class: Arachnida
- Order: Solifugae
- Family: Ammotrechidae
- Genus: Innesa; Roewer, 1934
- Species: I. vittata

Binomial name
- Innesa vittata (Pocock, 1902)

= Innesa =

Genus of camel spiders

Innesa is a monotypic genus of ammotrechid camel spiders, first described by Carl Friedrich Roewer in 1934. Its single species, Innesa vittata is distributed in Costa Rica and Guatemala.
