= Neocleobis =

Scientific classification
- Domain: Eukaryota
- Kingdom: Animalia
- Phylum: Arthropoda
- Subphylum: Chelicerata
- Class: Arachnida
- Order: Solifugae
- Family: Ammotrechidae
- Genus: Neocleobis; Roewer, 1934
- Species: N. solitarius

Binomial name
- Neocleobis solitarius (Banks, 1902)

Genus of camel spiders

Neocleobis is a monotypic genus of ammotrechid camel spiders, first described by Carl Friedrich Roewer in 1934. Its single species, Neocleobis solitarius is distributed in Galápagos Islands.
