= Pseudocleobis =

Scientific classification
- Domain: Eukaryota
- Kingdom: Animalia
- Phylum: Arthropoda
- Subphylum: Chelicerata
- Class: Arachnida
- Order: Solifugae
- Family: Ammotrechidae
- Genus: Pseudocleobis; Pocock, 1900

Type species
- Pseudocleobis andinus (Pocock, 1899)

Species
- 21, see text

Genus of camel spiders

Pseudocleobis is a genus of ammotrechid camel spiders, first described by Reginald Innes Pocock in 1900.

== Species ==
As of October 2022, the World Solifugae Catalog accepts the following twenty-one species:

- Pseudocleobis alticola Pocock, 1900 — Argentina, Bolivia
- Pseudocleobis andinus (Pocock, 1899) — Argentina, Bolivia, Chile, Peru
- Pseudocleobis arequipae Roewer, 1959 — Peru
- Pseudocleobis bardensis Maury, 1976 — Argentina
- Pseudocleobis calchaqui Maury, 1983 — Argentina
- Pseudocleobis chilensis Roewer, 1934 — Chile
- Pseudocleobis hirschmanni Kraepelin, 1911 — Bolivia, Chile
- Pseudocleobis huinca Maury, 1976 — Argentina
- Pseudocleobis ilavea Roewer, 1952 — Peru
- Pseudocleobis levii Maury, 1980 — Argentina
- Pseudocleobis morsicans (Gervais, 1849) — Argentina, Bolivia, Chile
- Pseudocleobis mustersi Maury, 1980 — Argentina
- Pseudocleobis orientalis Maury, 1976 — Argentina
- Pseudocleobis ovicornis Lawrence, 1954 — Peru
- Pseudocleobis peruviana Roewer, 1957 — Peru
- Pseudocleobis profanus Iuri & Iglesias, 2022 — Argentina
- Pseudocleobis puelche Maury, 1976 — Argentina
- Pseudocleobis solitarius Maury, 1976 — Argentina
- Pseudocleobis tarmana Roewer, 1952 — Peru
- Pseudocleobis titschacki (Roewer, 1942) — Peru
- Pseudocleobis truncatus Maury, 1976 — Argentina
