= Mortola mortola =

Scientific classification
- Domain: Eukaryota
- Kingdom: Animalia
- Phylum: Arthropoda
- Subphylum: Chelicerata
- Class: Arachnida
- Order: Solifugae
- Family: Ammotrechidae
- Genus: Mortola; Mello-Leitão, 1938
- Species: M. mortola

Binomial name
- Mortola mortola Mello-Leitão, 1938

Species of camel spider

Mortola is a monotypic genus of ammotrechid camel spiders, first described by Cândido Firmino de Mello-Leitão in 1938. Its single species, Mortola mortola, is distributed in Argentina.
