= Ammotrechinus =

Scientific classification
- Domain: Eukaryota
- Kingdom: Animalia
- Phylum: Arthropoda
- Subphylum: Chelicerata
- Class: Arachnida
- Order: Solifugae
- Family: Ammotrechidae
- Genus: Ammotrechinus; Roewer, 1934
- Species: A. gryllipes

Binomial name
- Ammotrechinus gryllipes (Gervais, 1842)

Genus of camel spiders

Ammotrechinus is a monotypic genus of ammotrechid camel spiders, first described by Carl Friedrich Roewer in 1934. Its single species, Ammotrechinus gryllipes is distributed in Haiti and Jamaica.
