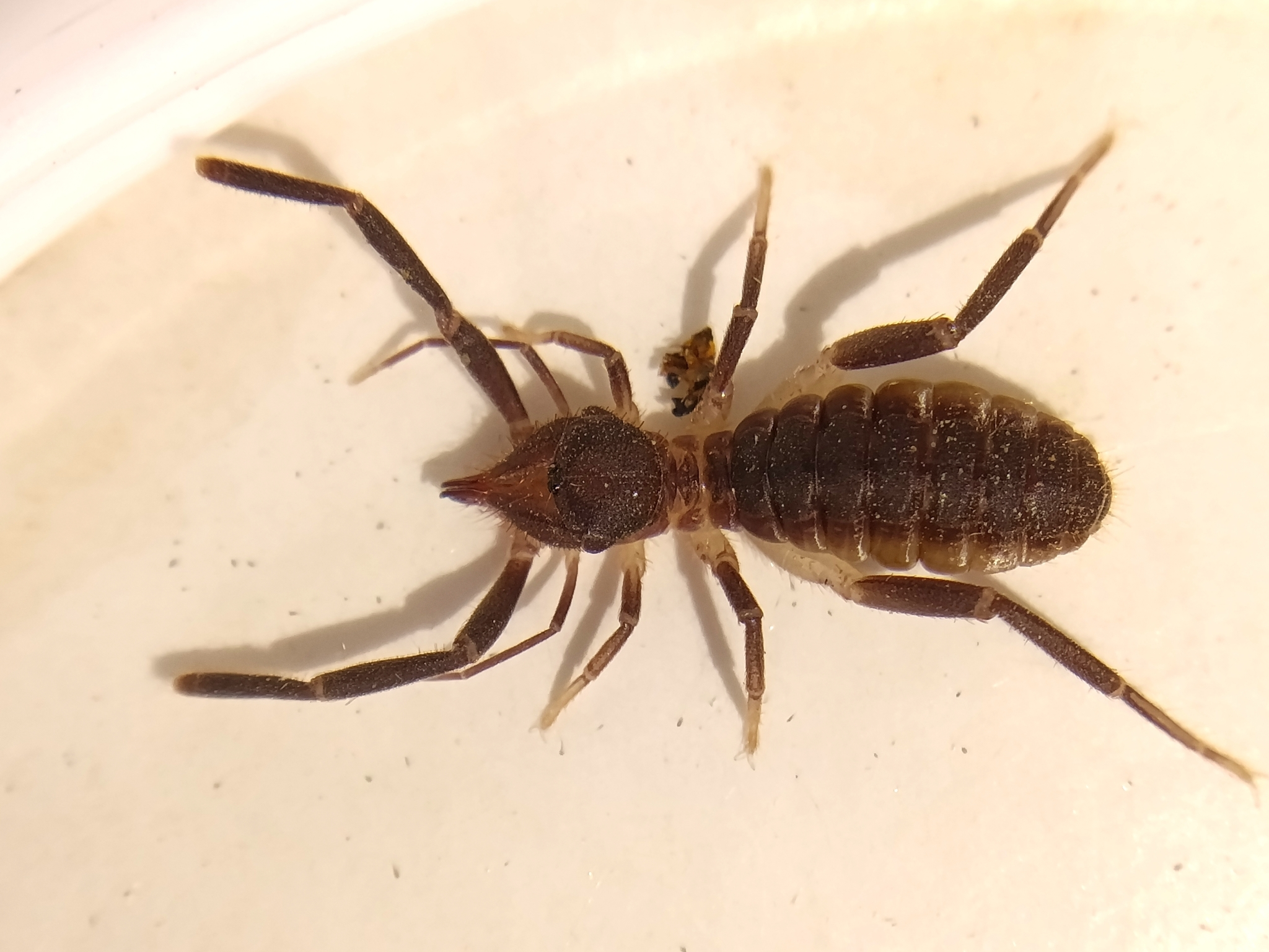
- Eutrecha florezi

Scientific classification
- Kingdom: Animalia
- Phylum: Arthropoda
- Subphylum: Chelicerata
- Class: Arachnida
- Order: Solifugae
- Family: Ammotrechidae
- Genus: Eutrecha; Maury, 1982

Type species
- Eutrecha longirostris Maury, 1982

Species
- E. belenensis Botero-Trujillo et al., 2023; E. florezi Villareal-Blanco, Armas & Martínez, 2017; E. longirostris Maury, 1982

= Eutrecha =

Genus of camel spiders

Eutrecha is a genus of ammotrechid camel spiders, first described by Emilio Antonio Maury in 1982. It currently includes three species:

- Eutrecha belenensis, distributed in Colombia.
- Eutrecha florezi, distributed in Colombia.
- Eutrecha longirostris, distributed in Venezuela.
