= Saronomus =

Scientific classification
- Domain: Eukaryota
- Kingdom: Animalia
- Phylum: Arthropoda
- Subphylum: Chelicerata
- Class: Arachnida
- Order: Solifugae
- Family: Ammotrechidae
- Genus: Saronomus; Kraepelin, 1900
- Species: S. capensis

Binomial name
- Saronomus capensis (Kraepelin, 1899)

Genus of camel spiders

Saronomus is a monotypic genus of ammotrechid camel spiders, first described by Karl Kraepelin in 1900. Its single species, Saronomus capensis can be encountered in Colombia and Venezuela.
