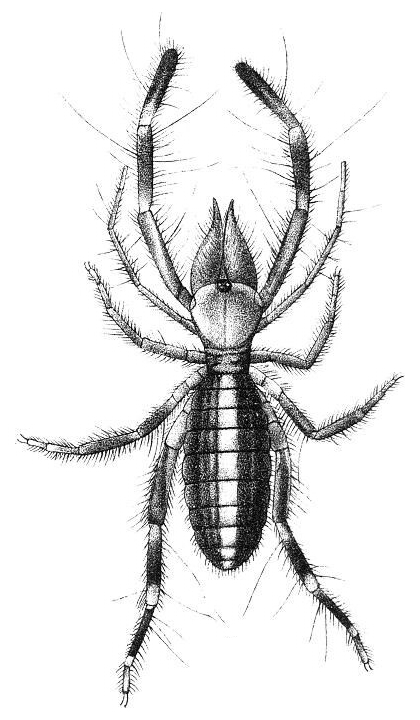
- Ammotrecha stollii

Scientific classification
- Kingdom: Animalia
- Phylum: Arthropoda
- Subphylum: Chelicerata
- Class: Arachnida
- Order: Solifugae
- Family: Ammotrechidae
- Genus: Ammotrecha; Banks, 1900

Type species
- Ammotrecha limbata (Lucas, 1835)

Species
- 10, see text

= Ammotrecha =

Genus of camel spiders

Ammotrecha is a genus of ammotrechid camel spiders, first described by Nathan Banks in 1900.

== Species ==
As of October 2022, the World Solifugae Catalog accepts the following ten species:

- Ammotrecha araucana Mello-Leitão, 1942 — Chile
- Ammotrecha chiapasi Muma, 1986 — Mexico
- Ammotrecha cobinensis Muma, 1951 — Mexico, US (California)
- Ammotrecha enriquei Armas & Teruel, 2005 — Cuba
- Ammotrecha friedlaenderi Roewer, 1954 — Brazil
- Ammotrecha itzaana Muma, 1986 — Mexico
- Ammotrecha limbata (Lucas, 1835) — El Salvador, Guatemala, Mexico
- Ammotrecha nigrescens Roewer, 1934 — Costa Rica, Guatemala
- Ammotrecha picta Pocock, 1902 — Guatemala
- Ammotrecha stollii (Pocock, 1895) — Costa Rica, El Salvador, Grenada, Guatemala, Mexico, Nicaragua, US (Louisiana, Texas)
