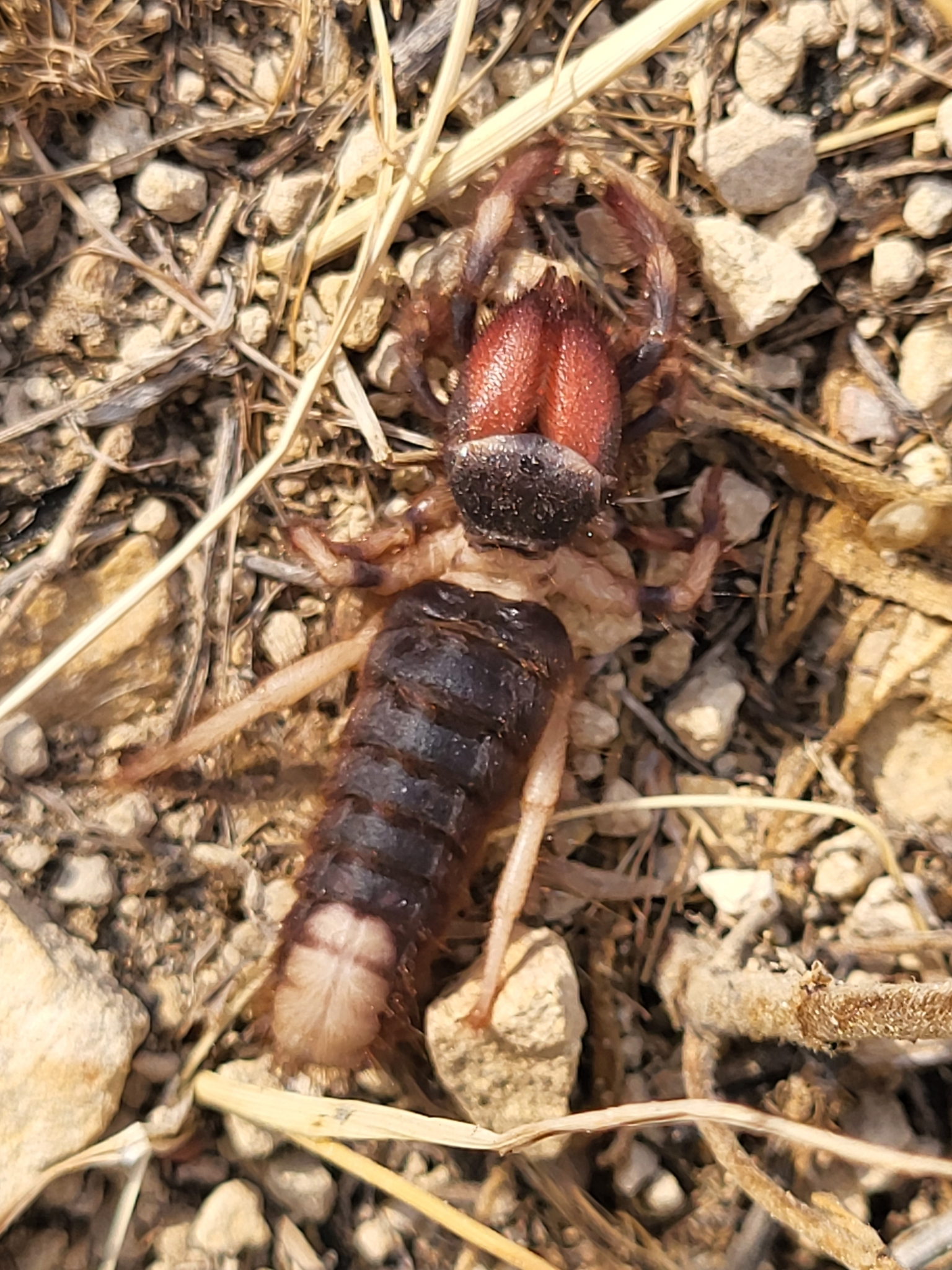

Scientific classification
- Domain: Eukaryota
- Kingdom: Animalia
- Phylum: Arthropoda
- Subphylum: Chelicerata
- Class: Arachnida
- Order: Solifugae
- Family: Rhagodidae
- Genus: Rhagodes
- Species: R. caucasicus

Binomial name
- Rhagodes caucasicus Birula, 1905

= Rhagodes caucasicus =

Species of arachnid

Rhagodes caucasicus is a species of solifuges in the family Rhagodidae.

The type locality of the species is Tuzluca, Turkey, although it was previously misidentified as being in Armenia. The species is also known from Armenia, Azerbaijan and Iran. The species is described as "narrowly distributed and uncommon".
