= Rhagodes massaicus =

Scientific classification
- Domain: Eukaryota
- Kingdom: Animalia
- Phylum: Arthropoda
- Subphylum: Chelicerata
- Class: Arachnida
- Order: Solifugae
- Family: Rhagodidae
- Genus: Rhagodes
- Species: R. massaicus

Binomial name
- Rhagodes massaicus Roewer, 1933

Species of arachnid

Rhagodes massaicus is a species of solifuge within the family Rhagodidae. The species is known to be distributed in Tanzania from a type specimen collected in the Masai Steppe, Arusha.
