= Rhagoditta susa =

Scientific classification
- Kingdom: Animalia
- Phylum: Arthropoda
- Subphylum: Chelicerata
- Class: Arachnida
- Order: Solifugae
- Family: Rhagodidae
- Genus: Rhagoditta
- Species: R. susa

Binomial name
- Rhagoditta susa Roewer, 1933

Species of arachnid

Rhagoditta susa is a species of solifuge within the family Rhagodidae found distributed in Iran. 2 specimens of the species have been found, with 1 being 5 to 15 kilometers off a road to Tehran, and the other in the ruins of Susa.
