= Rhagodixa =

Scientific classification
- Domain: Eukaryota
- Kingdom: Animalia
- Phylum: Arthropoda
- Subphylum: Chelicerata
- Class: Arachnida
- Order: Solifugae
- Family: Rhagodidae
- Genus: Rhagodixa; Roewer, 1933

Type species
- Rhagodixa hirsti Roewer, 1933

Species
- 3, see text

Genus of camel spiders

Rhagodixa is a genus of rhagodid camel spiders, first described by Carl Friedrich Roewer in 1933.

== Species ==
As of April 2023, the World Solifugae Catalog accepts the following three species:

- Rhagodixa hirsti Roewer, 1933 — Iran or Pakistan
- Rhagodixa kurdistanica (Birula, 1936) — Iraq
- Rhagodixa transjordania Turk, 1960 — Jordan
