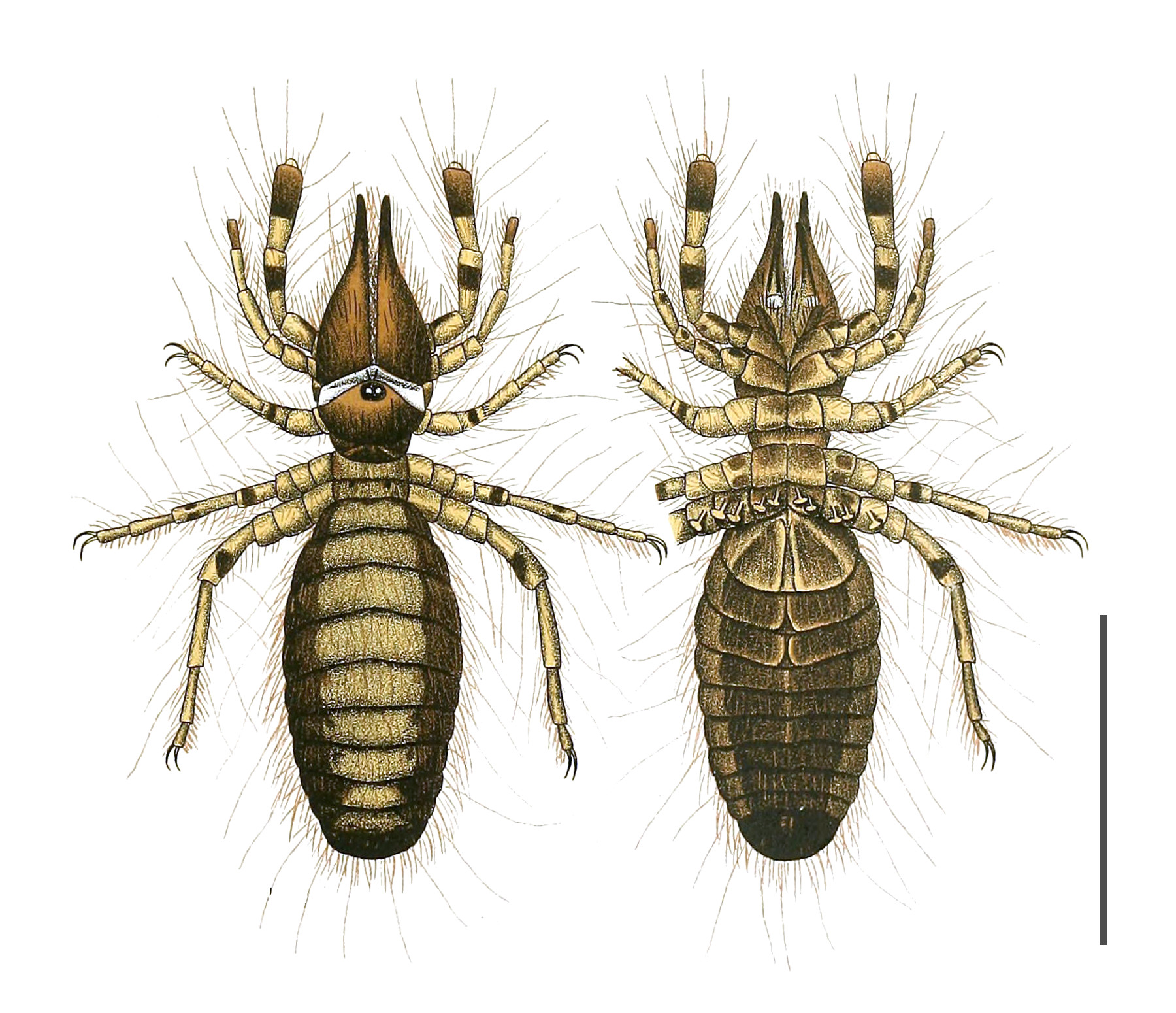
- Rhagodima nigrocincta
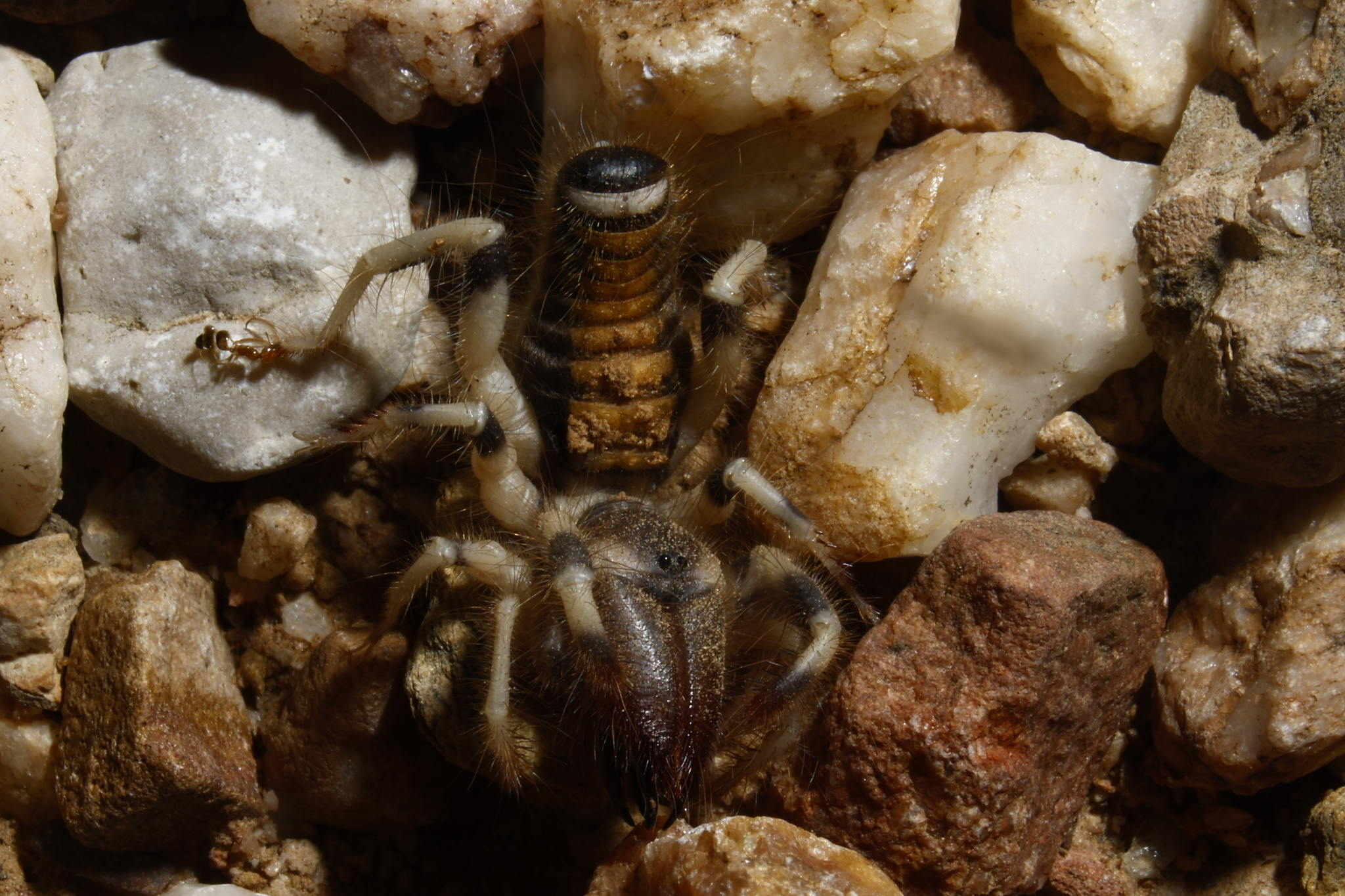
- Wild individual from Kadapa district, Andhra Pradesh, India.

Scientific classification
- Kingdom: Animalia
- Phylum: Arthropoda
- Subphylum: Chelicerata
- Class: Arachnida
- Order: Solifugae
- Family: Rhagodidae
- Genus: Rhagodima; Roewer, 1933

Type species
- Rhagodima annulata (Simon, 1885)

Species
- 2, see text

= Rhagodima =

Genus of camel spiders

Rhagodima is a genus of rhagodid camel spiders endemic to India first described by Carl Friedrich Roewer in 1933.

== Species ==
As of April 2023, the World Solifugae Catalog accepts the following two species:

- Rhagodima annulata (Simon, 1885) — India
- Rhagodima nigrocincta (Bernard, 1893) — India
