= Rhagodinus =

Scientific classification
- Domain: Eukaryota
- Kingdom: Animalia
- Phylum: Arthropoda
- Subphylum: Chelicerata
- Class: Arachnida
- Order: Solifugae
- Family: Rhagodidae
- Genus: Rhagodinus; Roewer, 1933

Type species
- Rhagodinus caenaeicus (Penther, 1913)

Species
- 2, see text

Genus of camel spiders

Rhagodinus is a genus of rhagodid camel spiders, first described by Carl Friedrich Roewer in 1933.

== Species ==
As of April 2023, the World Solifugae Catalog accepts the following two species:

- Rhagodinus caenaeicus (Penther, 1913) — Iraq, Israel
- Rhagodinus incertus Caporiacco, 1937 — Ethiopia
