= Rhagodeca =

Scientific classification
- Domain: Eukaryota
- Kingdom: Animalia
- Phylum: Arthropoda
- Subphylum: Chelicerata
- Class: Arachnida
- Order: Solifugae
- Family: Rhagodidae
- Genus: Rhagodeca; Roewer, 1933

Type species
- Rhagodeca impavida (C.L. Koch, 1842)

Species
- 3, see text

Genus of camel spiders

Rhagodeca is a genus of rhagodid camel spiders, first described by Carl Friedrich Roewer in 1933.

== Species ==
As of April 2023, the World Solifugae Catalog accepts the following three species:

- Rhagodeca fuscichelis Roewer, 1941 — Israel, Syria
- Rhagodeca hirsti Roewer, 1933 — Palestine
- Rhagodeca impavida (C.L. Koch, 1842) — Oman, Yemen
