= Rhagodalma =

Scientific classification
- Domain: Eukaryota
- Kingdom: Animalia
- Phylum: Arthropoda
- Subphylum: Chelicerata
- Class: Arachnida
- Order: Solifugae
- Family: Rhagodidae
- Genus: Rhagodalma; Roewer, 1933
- Species: R. melanocephala

Binomial name
- Rhagodalma melanocephala Roewer, 1933

Genus of camel spiders

Rhagodalma is a monotypic genus of rhagodid camel spiders, first described by Carl Friedrich Roewer in 1933. Its single species, Rhagodalma melanocephala is distributed in Sudan.
