= Rhagodoca =

Scientific classification
- Domain: Eukaryota
- Kingdom: Animalia
- Phylum: Arthropoda
- Subphylum: Chelicerata
- Class: Arachnida
- Order: Solifugae
- Family: Rhagodidae
- Genus: Rhagodoca; Roewer, 1933

Type species
- Rhagodoca termes (Karsch, 1885)

Species
- 17, see text

Genus of camel spiders

Rhagodoca is a genus of rhagodid camel spiders, first described by Carl Friedrich Roewer in 1933.

== Species ==
As of April 2023, the World Solifugae Catalog accepts the following seventeen species:

- Rhagodoca baringona Roewer, 1933 — Kenya
- Rhagodoca bettoni Roewer, 1933 — Kenya
- Rhagodoca immaculata Roewer, 1933 — Kenya
- Rhagodoca longispina Roewer, 1933 — Iran or Pakistan
- Rhagodoca lowei Roewer, 1933 — Uganda
- Rhagodoca macrocephala Roewer, 1933 — Somalia
- Rhagodoca magna Roewer, 1941 — Iran or Pakistan
- Rhagodoca ornata (Pocock, 1895) — Djibouti, Ethiopia, Kenya
- Rhagodoca paecila Caporiacco, 1941 — Ethiopia
- Rhagodoca phillipsii (Pocock, 1896) — Ethiopia, Kenya, Somalia
- Rhagodoca picta Roewer, 1933 — Somalia
- Rhagodoca pusilla Caporiacco, 1944 — Somalia
- Rhagodoca smithii (Pocock, 1897) — Kenya
- Rhagodoca somalica Roewer, 1933 — Ethiopia
- Rhagodoca termes (Karsch, 1885) — Kenya, Somalia, Tanzania
- Rhagodoca ugandana Roewer, 1933 — Uganda
- Rhagodoca zavattarii Caporiacco, 1941 — Ethiopia
