= Rhagodospus =

Scientific classification
- Domain: Eukaryota
- Kingdom: Animalia
- Phylum: Arthropoda
- Subphylum: Chelicerata
- Class: Arachnida
- Order: Solifugae
- Family: Rhagodidae
- Genus: Rhagodospus; Roewer, 1941
- Species: R. babylonicus

Binomial name
- Rhagodospus babylonicus Roewer, 1941

Genus of camel spiders

Rhagodospus is a monotypic genus of rhagodid camel spiders, first described by Carl Friedrich Roewer in 1941. Its single species, Rhagodospus babylonicus is distributed in Iraq.
