= Rhagodomma =

Scientific classification
- Domain: Eukaryota
- Kingdom: Animalia
- Phylum: Arthropoda
- Subphylum: Chelicerata
- Class: Arachnida
- Order: Solifugae
- Family: Rhagodidae
- Genus: Rhagodomma; Roewer, 1933
- Species: R. vittata

Binomial name
- Rhagodomma vittata (Pocock, 1899)

Genus of camel spiders

Rhagodomma is a monotypic genus of rhagodid camel spiders, first described by Carl Friedrich Roewer in 1933. Its single species, Rhagodomma vittata is distributed in India.
