= Rhagodia (arachnid) =

Scientific classification
- Domain: Eukaryota
- Kingdom: Animalia
- Phylum: Arthropoda
- Subphylum: Chelicerata
- Class: Arachnida
- Order: Solifugae
- Family: Rhagodidae
- Genus: Rhagodia; Roewer, 1933

Type species
- Rhagodia obscurior Roewer, 1933

Species
- 4, see text

Genus of camel spiders

Rhagodia is a genus of rhagodid camel spiders, first described by Carl Friedrich Roewer in 1933.

== Species ==
As of April 2023, the World Solifugae Catalog accepts the following four species:

- Rhagodia abessinica Roewer, 1933 — Ethiopia
- Rhagodia indica Roewer, 1933 — Pakistan
- Rhagodia obscurior (Penther, 1913) — Iraq, Turkey
- Rhagodia persica Roewer, 1941 — Iran
