= Rhagodorta =

Scientific classification
- Domain: Eukaryota
- Kingdom: Animalia
- Phylum: Arthropoda
- Subphylum: Chelicerata
- Class: Arachnida
- Order: Solifugae
- Family: Rhagodidae
- Genus: Rhagodorta; Roewer, 1933
- Species: R. zorab

Binomial name
- Rhagodorta zorab (Birula, 1905)

Genus of camel spiders

Rhagodorta is a monotypic genus of rhagodid camel spiders, first described by Carl Friedrich Roewer in 1933. Its single species, Rhagodorta zorab is distributed in Iran, Iraq and Saudi Arabia.
