= Rhagodelbus =

Scientific classification
- Domain: Eukaryota
- Kingdom: Animalia
- Phylum: Arthropoda
- Subphylum: Chelicerata
- Class: Arachnida
- Order: Solifugae
- Family: Rhagodidae
- Genus: Rhagodelbus; Roewer, 1941
- Species: R. bucharicus

Binomial name
- Rhagodelbus bucharicus (Birula, 1935)

Genus of camel spiders

Rhagodelbus is a monotypic genus of rhagodid camel spiders, first described by Carl Friedrich Roewer in 1941. Its single species, Rhagodelbus bucharicus is distributed in Uzbekistan.
