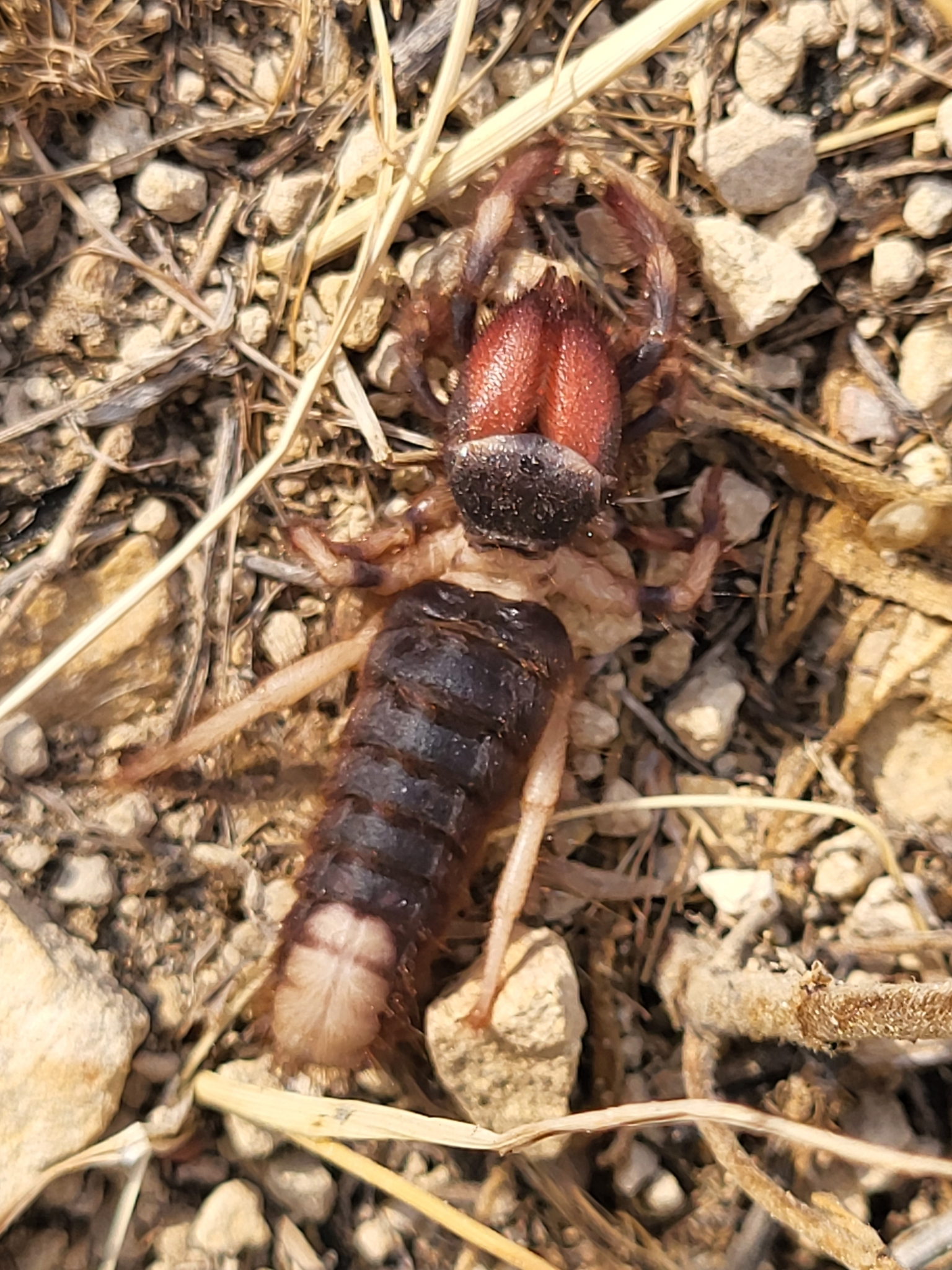
- Rhagodes caucasicus

Scientific classification
- Domain: Eukaryota
- Kingdom: Animalia
- Phylum: Arthropoda
- Subphylum: Chelicerata
- Class: Arachnida
- Order: Solifugae
- Family: Rhagodidae
- Genus: Rhagodes; Pocock, 1897

Type species
- Rhagodes melanus (Olivier, 1807)

Species
- 27, see text

= Rhagodes =

Genus of camel spiders

Rhagodes is a genus of rhagodid camel spiders, first described by Reginald Innes Pocock in 1897.

== Species ==
As of April 2023, the World Solifugae Catalog accepts the following twenty-seven species:

- Rhagodes aegypticus Roewer, 1933 — Egypt
- Rhagodes ahwazensis Kraus, 1959 — Iran
- Rhagodes albolimbata Caporiacco, 1927 — Somalia
- Rhagodes anthracinus Pocock, 1900 — Somalia
- Rhagodes ater (Roewer, 1933) — Israel
- Rhagodes aureus (Pocock, 1889) — Afghanistan, Iran, Somalia, Turkmenistan
- Rhagodes buryi Pocock, 1903 — Yemen
- Rhagodes caucasicus Birula, 1905 — Armenia, Azerbaijan, Iran, Turkey
- Rhagodes eylandti (Walter, 1889) — Iran, Turkmenistan
- Rhagodes furiosus (C.L. Koch, 1842) — Egypt, Libya
- Rhagodes karschi Kraepelin, 1899 — Tanzania
- Rhagodes leucopygus Birula, 1905 — Iran
- Rhagodes massaicus Roewer, 1933 — Tanzania
- Rhagodes melanochaetus Heymons, 1902 — Afghanistan, Iran, Kazakhstan, Turkmenistan
- Rhagodes melanopygus (Walter, 1889) — Afghanistan, Iran, Pakistan, Turkmenistan
- Rhagodes melanus (Olivier, 1807) — Algeria, Egypt, Israel, Tunisia
- Rhagodes metatarsalis (Roewer, 1933) — Afghanistan
- Rhagodes minor Lawrence, 1956 — Afghanistan
- Rhagodes nicotrae Caporiacco, 1939 — Somalia
- Rhagodes persica Kraepelin, 1899 — Iran
- Rhagodes phipsoni (Pocock, 1895) — Sri Lanka
- Rhagodes plumbescens (Walter, 1889) — Turkmenistan
- Rhagodes rothschildi Pocock, 1903 — Yemen
- Rhagodes semiflavus (Pocock, 1889) — Pakistan
- Rhagodes strandi Caporiacco, 1939 — Somalia
- Rhagodes trambustii Caporiacco, 1950 — Somalia
- Rhagodes zugmayeri (Roewer, 1933) — Pakistan
