= Rhagodopa =

Scientific classification
- Domain: Eukaryota
- Kingdom: Animalia
- Phylum: Arthropoda
- Subphylum: Chelicerata
- Class: Arachnida
- Order: Solifugae
- Family: Rhagodidae
- Genus: Rhagodopa; Roewer, 1933

Type species
- Rhagodopa brevipes (Gervais, 1842)

Species
- 4, see text

Genus of camel spiders

Rhagodopa is a genus of rhagodid camel spiders, first described by Carl Friedrich Roewer in 1933.

== Species ==
As of April 2023, the World Solifugae Catalog accepts the following four species:

- Rhagodopa brevipes (Gervais, 1842) — India, Nepal
- Rhagodopa ferghana Roewer, 1933 — Kyrgyzstan
- Rhagodopa jaffana Roewer, 1933 — Israel
- Rhagodopa setipes (Birula, 1905) — Iran or Pakistan
