= Rhagodista =

Scientific classification
- Domain: Eukaryota
- Kingdom: Animalia
- Phylum: Arthropoda
- Subphylum: Chelicerata
- Class: Arachnida
- Order: Solifugae
- Family: Rhagodidae
- Genus: Rhagodista; Kraus, 1959
- Species: R. diabolica

Binomial name
- Rhagodista diabolica Kraus, 1959

Genus of camel spiders

Rhagodista is a monotypic genus of rhagodid camel spiders, first described by Otto Kraus in 1959. Its single species, Rhagodista diabolica is distributed in Iran.
