= Rhagodorimus =

Scientific classification
- Domain: Eukaryota
- Kingdom: Animalia
- Phylum: Arthropoda
- Subphylum: Chelicerata
- Class: Arachnida
- Order: Solifugae
- Family: Rhagodidae
- Genus: Rhagodorimus; Turk, 1948
- Species: R. judaicus

Binomial name
- Rhagodorimus judaicus Turk, 1948

Genus of camel spiders

Rhagodorimus is a monotypic genus of rhagodid camel spiders, first described by Frank Turk in 1948. Its single species, Rhagodorimus judaicus is distributed in Israel.
