= Rhagodessa =

Scientific classification
- Kingdom: Animalia
- Phylum: Arthropoda
- Subphylum: Chelicerata
- Class: Arachnida
- Order: Solifugae
- Family: Rhagodidae
- Genus: Rhagodessa; Roewer, 1933

Type species
- Rhagodessa melanocephala (Simon, 1879)

Species
- 5, see text

Genus of camel spiders

Rhagodessa is a genus of rhagodid camel spiders, first described by Carl Friedrich Roewer in 1933.

== Species ==
As of April 2023, the World Solifugae Catalog accepts the following five species:

- Rhagodessa cloudsleythompsoni Benoit, 1964 — Sudan
- Rhagodessa judaica (Kraepelin, 1899) — Israel, Syria
- Rhagodessa melanocephala (Simon, 1879) — Eritrea, Sudan
- Rhagodessa sudanensis Roewer, 1933 — Sudan
- Rhagodessa zionensis Roewer, 1933 — Israel
