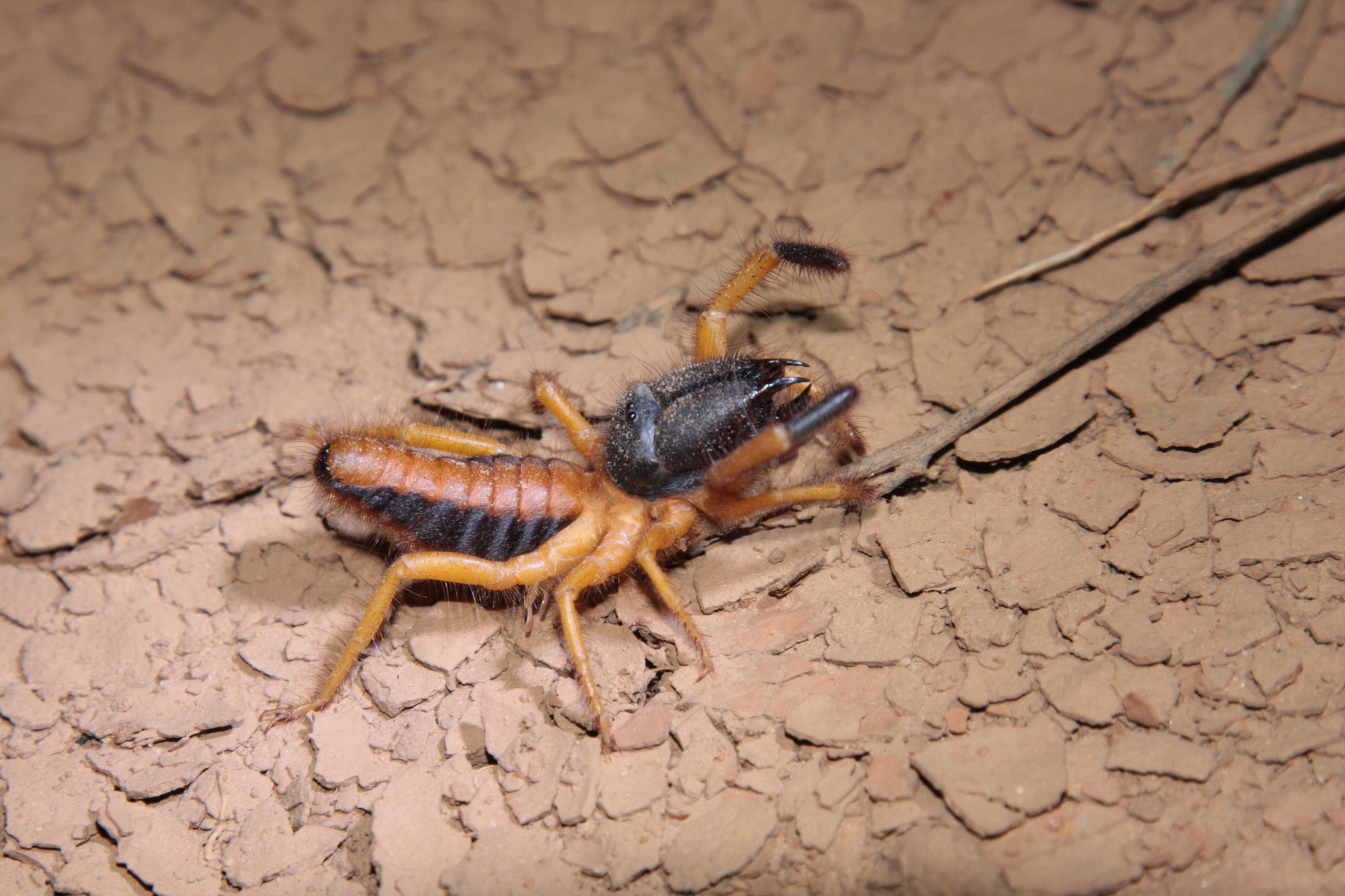
- Rhagoderma tricolor

Scientific classification
- Domain: Eukaryota
- Kingdom: Animalia
- Phylum: Arthropoda
- Subphylum: Chelicerata
- Class: Arachnida
- Order: Solifugae
- Family: Rhagodidae
- Genus: Rhagoderma; Roewer, 1933

Type species
- Rhagoderma nigriceps (Pocock, 1895)

Species
- 3, see text

= Rhagoderma =

Genus of camel spiders

Rhagoderma is a genus of rhagodid camel spiders, first described by Carl Friedrich Roewer in 1933.

== Species ==
As of April 2023, the World Solifugae Catalog accepts the following three species:

- Rhagoderma assamensis Roewer, 1933 — India
- Rhagoderma nigriceps (Pocock, 1895) — India, Pakistan
- Rhagoderma tricolor Roewer, 1941 — Israel
