= Rhagoderus =

Scientific classification
- Domain: Eukaryota
- Kingdom: Animalia
- Phylum: Arthropoda
- Subphylum: Chelicerata
- Class: Arachnida
- Order: Solifugae
- Family: Rhagodidae
- Genus: Rhagoderus; Roewer, 1933
- Species: R. griseopilosus

Binomial name
- Rhagoderus griseopilosus Roewer, 1933

Genus of camel spiders

Rhagoderus is a monotypic genus of rhagodid camel spiders, first described by Carl Friedrich Roewer in 1933. Its single species, Rhagoderus griseopilosus is distributed in Israel.
