= Rhagoduna =

Scientific classification
- Domain: Eukaryota
- Kingdom: Animalia
- Phylum: Arthropoda
- Subphylum: Chelicerata
- Class: Arachnida
- Order: Solifugae
- Family: Rhagodidae
- Genus: Rhagoduna; Roewer, 1933

Type species
- Rhagoduna nocturna Roewer, 1933

Species
- 4, see text

Genus of camel spiders

Rhagoduna is a genus of rhagodid camel spiders, first described by Carl Friedrich Roewer in 1933.

== Species ==
As of April 2023, the World Solifugae Catalog accepts the following four species:

- Rhagoduna deserticola Roewer, 1941 — Syria
- Rhagoduna kambyses Roewer, 1933 — Iran, Pakistan
- Rhagoduna nocturna Roewer, 1933 — Sudan
- Rhagoduna puccionii (Caporiacco, 1927) — Somalia
