= Rhagodolus =

Scientific classification
- Domain: Eukaryota
- Kingdom: Animalia
- Phylum: Arthropoda
- Subphylum: Chelicerata
- Class: Arachnida
- Order: Solifugae
- Family: Rhagodidae
- Genus: Rhagodolus; Roewer, 1933
- Species: R. mirandus

Binomial name
- Rhagodolus mirandus (Pocock, 1895)

Genus of camel spiders

Rhagodolus is a monotypic genus of rhagodid camel spiders, first described by Carl Friedrich Roewer in 1933. Its single species, Rhagodolus mirandus is distributed in Gambia and Nigeria.
