= Rhagodira =

Scientific classification
- Domain: Eukaryota
- Kingdom: Animalia
- Phylum: Arthropoda
- Subphylum: Chelicerata
- Class: Arachnida
- Order: Solifugae
- Family: Rhagodidae
- Genus: Rhagodira; Roewer, 1933

Type species
- Rhagodira ochropus (Dufour, 1861)

Species
- 3, see text

Genus of camel spiders

Rhagodira is a genus of rhagodid camel spiders, first described by Carl Friedrich Roewer in 1933.

== Species ==
As of April 2023, the World Solifugae Catalog accepts the following three species:

- Rhagodira algerica Roewer, 1933 — Algeria, Morocco, Tunisia
- Rhagodira lindbergi Roewer, 1960 — Afghanistan
- Rhagodira ochropus (Dufour, 1861) — Algeria, Tunisia
