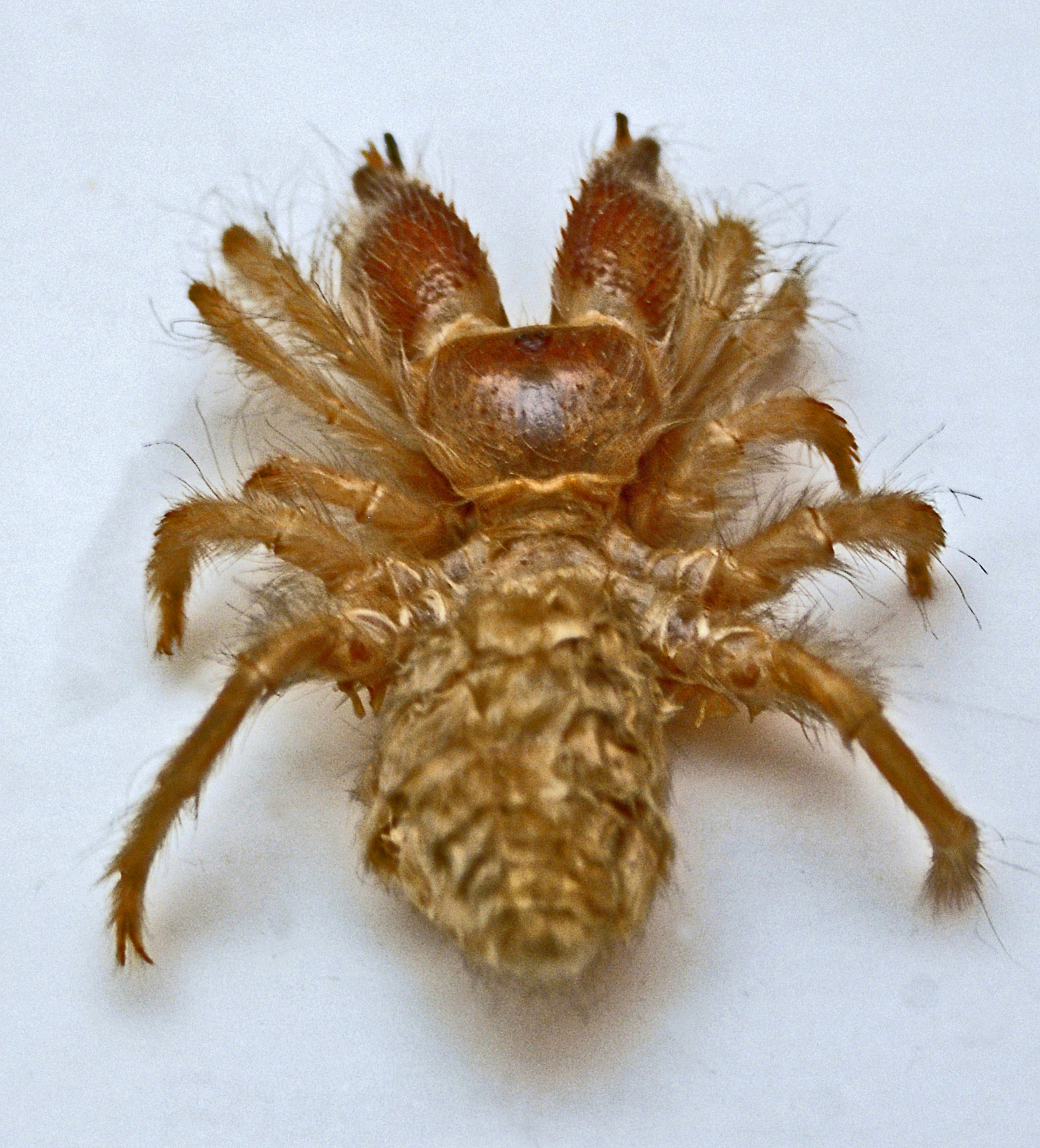

Scientific classification
- Domain: Eukaryota
- Kingdom: Animalia
- Phylum: Arthropoda
- Subphylum: Chelicerata
- Class: Arachnida
- Order: Solifugae
- Family: Rhagodidae
- Genus: Rhagodeya; Roewer, 1933

Type species
- Rhagodeya nubia Roewer, 1933

Species
- 2, see text

= Rhagodeya =

Genus of camel spiders

Rhagodeya is a genus of rhagodid camel spiders, first described by Carl Friedrich Roewer in 1933.

== Species ==
As of April 2023, the World Solifugae Catalog accepts the following two species:

- Rhagodeya nigra Caporiacco, 1937 — Libya
- Rhagodeya nubia Roewer, 1933 — Sudan
