= Rhagoditta =

Scientific classification
- Domain: Eukaryota
- Kingdom: Animalia
- Phylum: Arthropoda
- Subphylum: Chelicerata
- Class: Arachnida
- Order: Solifugae
- Family: Rhagodidae
- Genus: Rhagoditta; Roewer, 1933

Type species
- Rhagoditta phalangium (Olivier, 1807)

Species
- 6, see text

Genus of camel spiders

Rhagoditta is a genus of rhagodid camel spiders, first described by Carl Friedrich Roewer in 1933.

== Species ==
As of April 2023, the World Solifugae Catalog accepts the following six species:

- Rhagoditta bacillata Roewer, 1941 — Libya
- Rhagoditta blanfordi Roewer, 1933 — Ethiopia
- Rhagoditta corallipes (Simon, 1885) — Algeria, Tunisia
- Rhagoditta nigra Roewer, 1933 — Iran or Pakistan
- Rhagoditta phalangium (Olivier, 1807) — Algeria, Egypt, Eritrea, Ethiopia, Israel, Somalia
- Rhagoditta susa Roewer, 1933 — Iran
