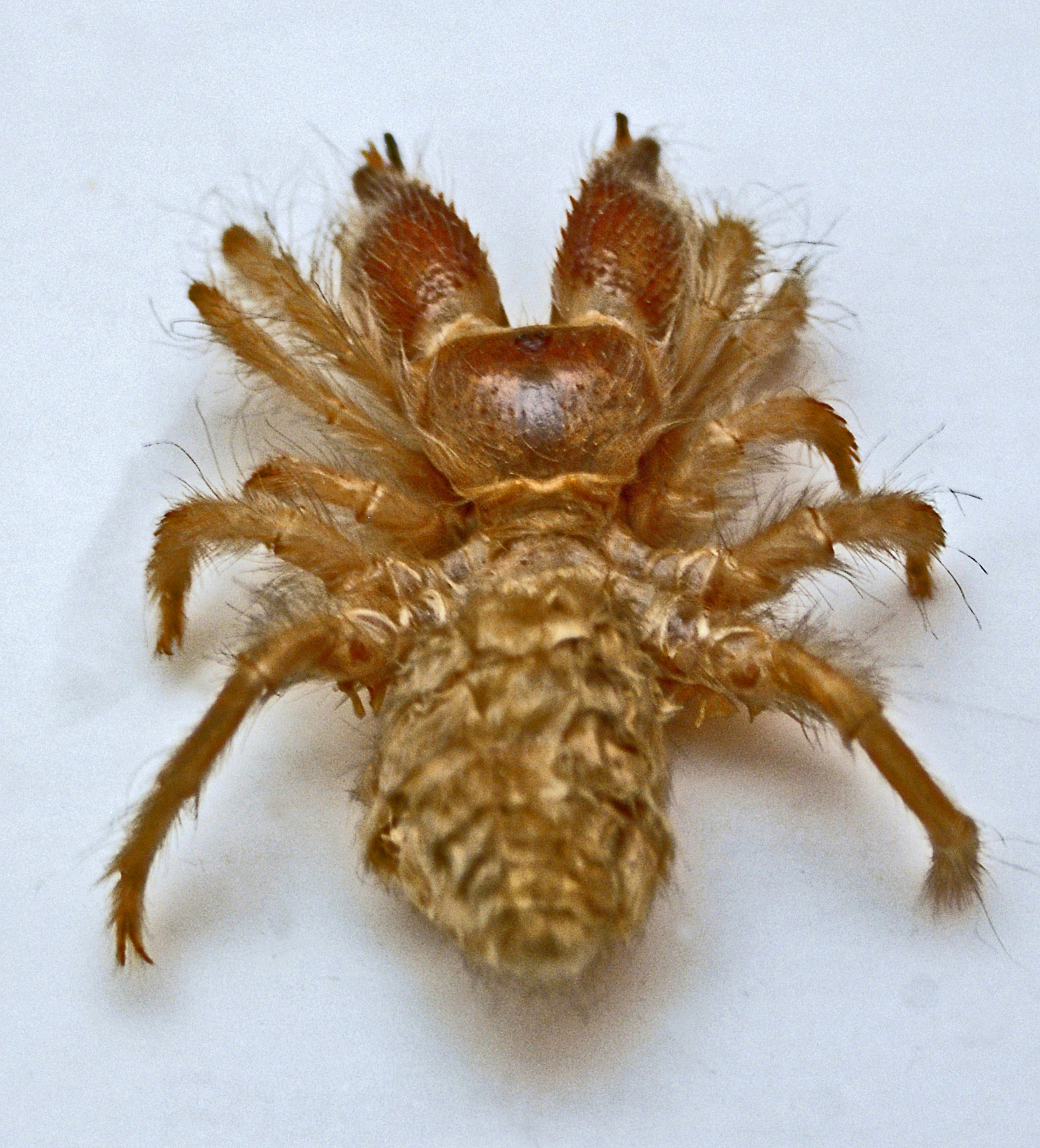
- Rhagodeya species

Scientific classification
- Domain: Eukaryota
- Kingdom: Animalia
- Phylum: Arthropoda
- Subphylum: Chelicerata
- Class: Arachnida
- Order: Solifugae
- Suborder: Boreosolifugae
- Family: Rhagodidae; Pocock, 1897

Genera
- See text.

Diversity
- 27 genera, 102 species

= Rhagodidae =

Family of spider-like animals

Rhagodidae is a family of solifuges, first described by Reginald Innes Pocock in 1897.

== Genera ==
As of November 2022, the World Solifugae Catalog accepts the following twenty-seven genera:

- Rhagodalma Roewer, 1933
- Rhagodax Roewer, 1941
- Rhagodeca Roewer, 1933
- Rhagodelbus Roewer, 1941
- Rhagoderma Roewer, 1933
- Rhagoderus Roewer, 1933
- Rhagodes Pocock, 1897
- Rhagodessa Roewer, 1933
- Rhagodeya Roewer, 1933
- Rhagodia Roewer, 1933
- Rhagodima Roewer, 1933
- Rhagodinus Roewer, 1933
- Rhagodippa Roewer, 1933
- Rhagodira Roewer, 1933
- Rhagodista Kraus, 1959
- Rhagoditta Roewer, 1933
- Rhagodixa Roewer, 1933
- Rhagodoca Roewer, 1933
- Rhagodolus Roewer, 1933
- Rhagodomma Roewer, 1933
- Rhagodopa Roewer, 1933
- Rhagodorimus Turk, 1948
- Rhagodorta Roewer, 1933
- Rhagodospus Roewer, 1941
- Rhagoduja Roewer, 1933
- Rhagodula Roewer, 1941
- Rhagoduna Roewer, 1933
