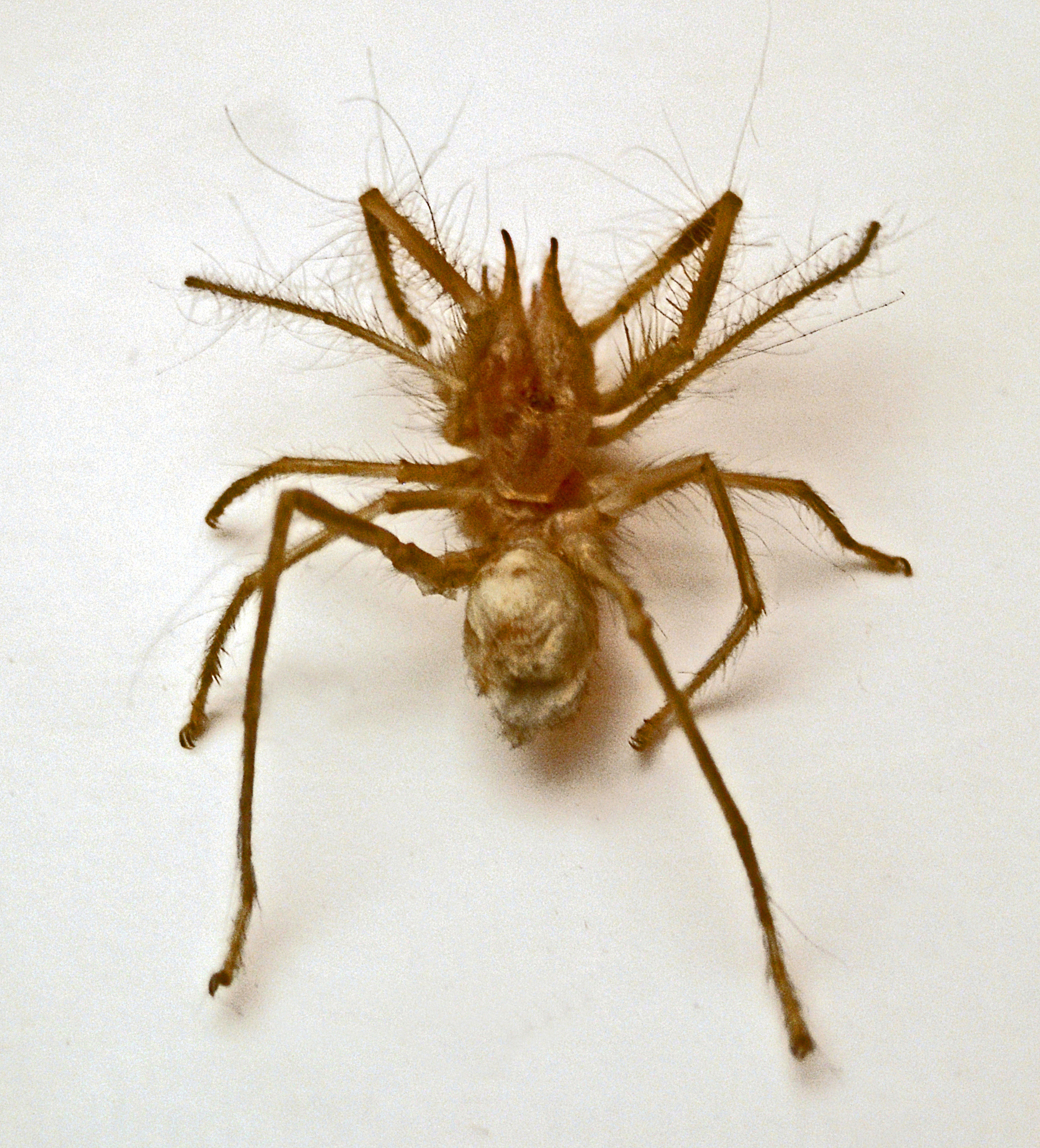
- Galeodes blanchardi from Libya

Scientific classification
- Kingdom: Animalia
- Phylum: Arthropoda
- Subphylum: Chelicerata
- Class: Arachnida
- Order: Solifugae
- Family: Galeodidae
- Genus: Galeodes
- Species: G. blanchardi

Binomial name
- Galeodes blanchardi Simon, 1891

Synonyms
- Galeodes (Galeodes) blanchardi Simon; Galeodibus blanchardi (Simon) Roewer, 1934

= Galeodes blanchardi =

Species of spider-like animal

Galeodes blanchardi is a species of solifuges or sun spiders.

== Description ==
These spiders show long hairy appendages. Like other solifuges, they are mainly nocturnal.

== Distribution and habitat ==
This species can be found in arid areas in Algeria, Libya, Morocco, Togo and Tunisia.
