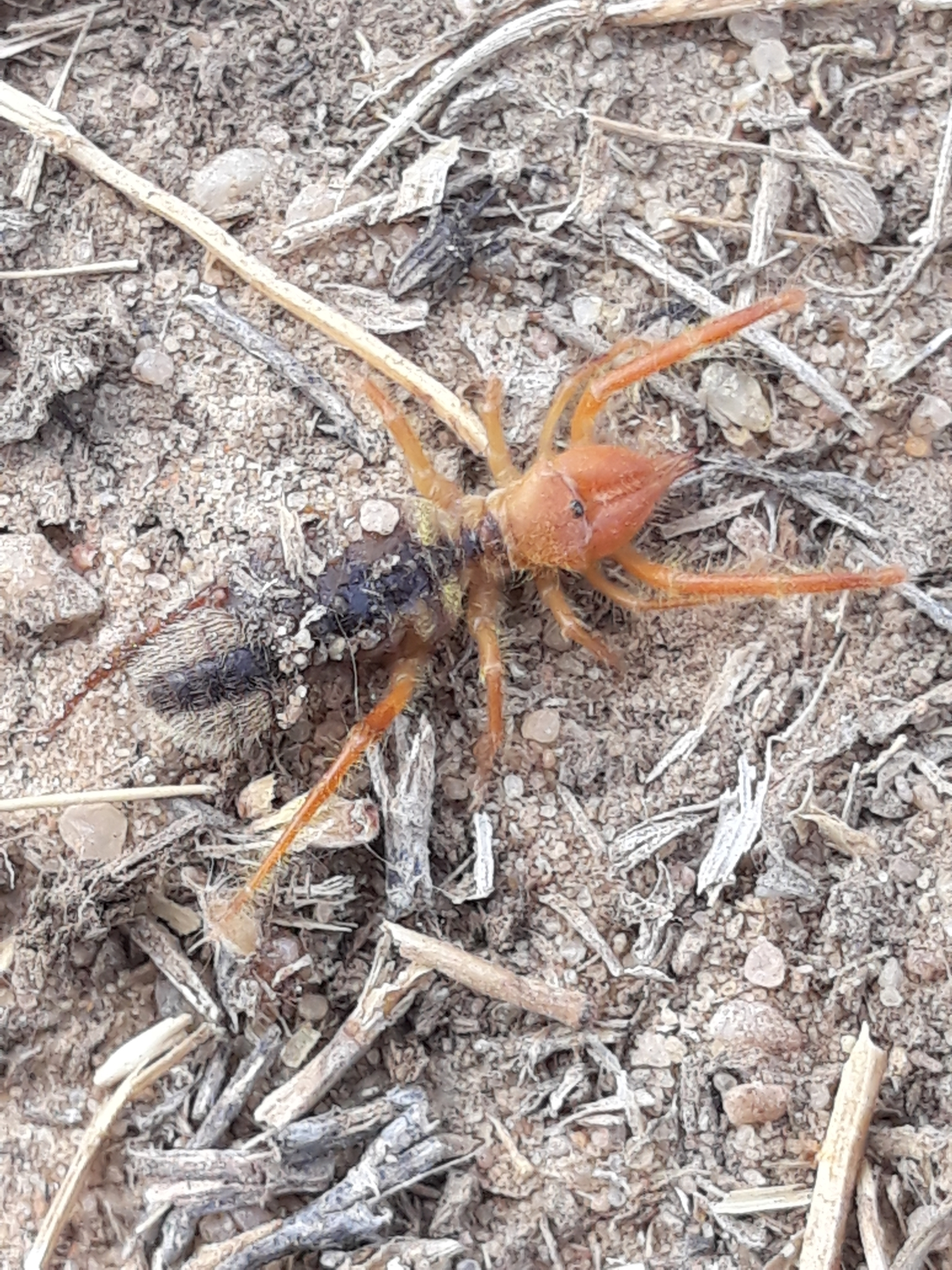
- Galeodes arabs from Algeria

Scientific classification
- Kingdom: Animalia
- Phylum: Arthropoda
- Subphylum: Chelicerata
- Class: Arachnida
- Order: Solifugae
- Family: Galeodidae
- Genus: Galeodes
- Species: G. arabs

Binomial name
- Galeodes arabs C. L. Koch, 1842

= Galeodes arabs =

Species of arachnid

Galeodes arabs, common name Egyptian giant solfugid or camel spider, is a species of solifuges (or sun spiders) native to North Africa and Western Asia.

== Subspecies ==
- Galeodes arabs arabs — Carl Ludwig Koch, 1842
- Galeodes arabs syriacus — Karl Kraepelin, 1899

== Description ==
Galeodes arabs is one of the larger species of camel spider and can reach a length of about 15 centimetres (5.9 in). They have large, powerful jaws, reaching one-third of their body length. They are nocturnal. They can reach a speed of 10 miles per hour (16 km/h). They are not venomous, but their bite is painful.

== Diet ==
They eat insects, small rodents and lizards. Using their chelicerae, they can chop and saw their victim’s flesh. Their jaws are equipped to shear hair and quills from their prey as well as cut through skin and the thin bones of small birds. They then utilise digestive juices to liquefy the flesh of their prey so they can suck it into their bodies.

== Predators ==
Some of their predators are large slit-faced bats, scorpions, toads and other insectivores or camel spiders. They are heliophobic and nocturnal in order to avoid predators, have better hunting and stay out of the hot sun.
