= Roeweriscus =

Scientific classification
- Domain: Eukaryota
- Kingdom: Animalia
- Phylum: Arthropoda
- Subphylum: Chelicerata
- Class: Arachnida
- Order: Solifugae
- Family: Galeodidae
- Genus: Roeweriscus; Birula, 1937
- Species: R. paradoxus

Binomial name
- Roeweriscus paradoxus Birula, 1937

Genus of camel spiders

Roeweriscus is a monotypic genus of Galeodid camel spiders, first described by Aleksei Birula in 1937. Its single species, Roeweriscus paradoxus is distributed in Iran.
