= Galeodumus =

Scientific classification
- Domain: Eukaryota
- Kingdom: Animalia
- Phylum: Arthropoda
- Subphylum: Chelicerata
- Class: Arachnida
- Order: Solifugae
- Family: Galeodidae
- Genus: Galeodumus; Roewer, 1960
- Species: G. colognatoi

Binomial name
- Galeodumus colognatoi Roewer, 1960

Genus of camel spiders

Galeodumus is a monotypic genus of Galeodid camel spiders, first described by Carl Friedrich Roewer in 1960. Its single species, Galeodumus colognatoi is distributed in Afghanistan.
