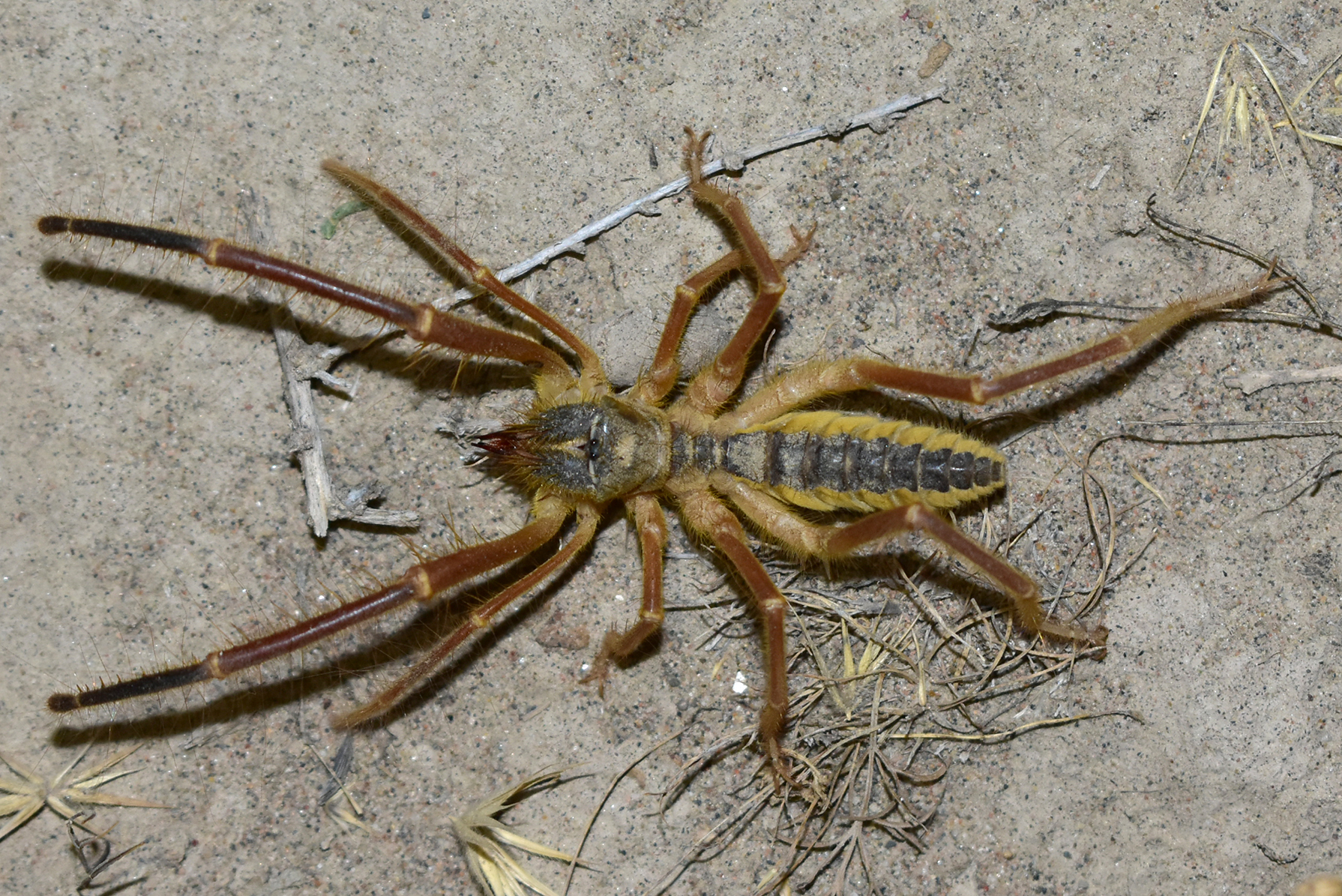
- Paragaleodes pallidus

Scientific classification
- Domain: Eukaryota
- Kingdom: Animalia
- Phylum: Arthropoda
- Subphylum: Chelicerata
- Class: Arachnida
- Order: Solifugae
- Family: Galeodidae
- Genus: Paragaleodes; Kraepelin, 1899

Type species
- Paragaleodes scalaris (C.L. Koch, 1842)

Species
- 12, see text

= Paragaleodes =

Genus of camel spiders

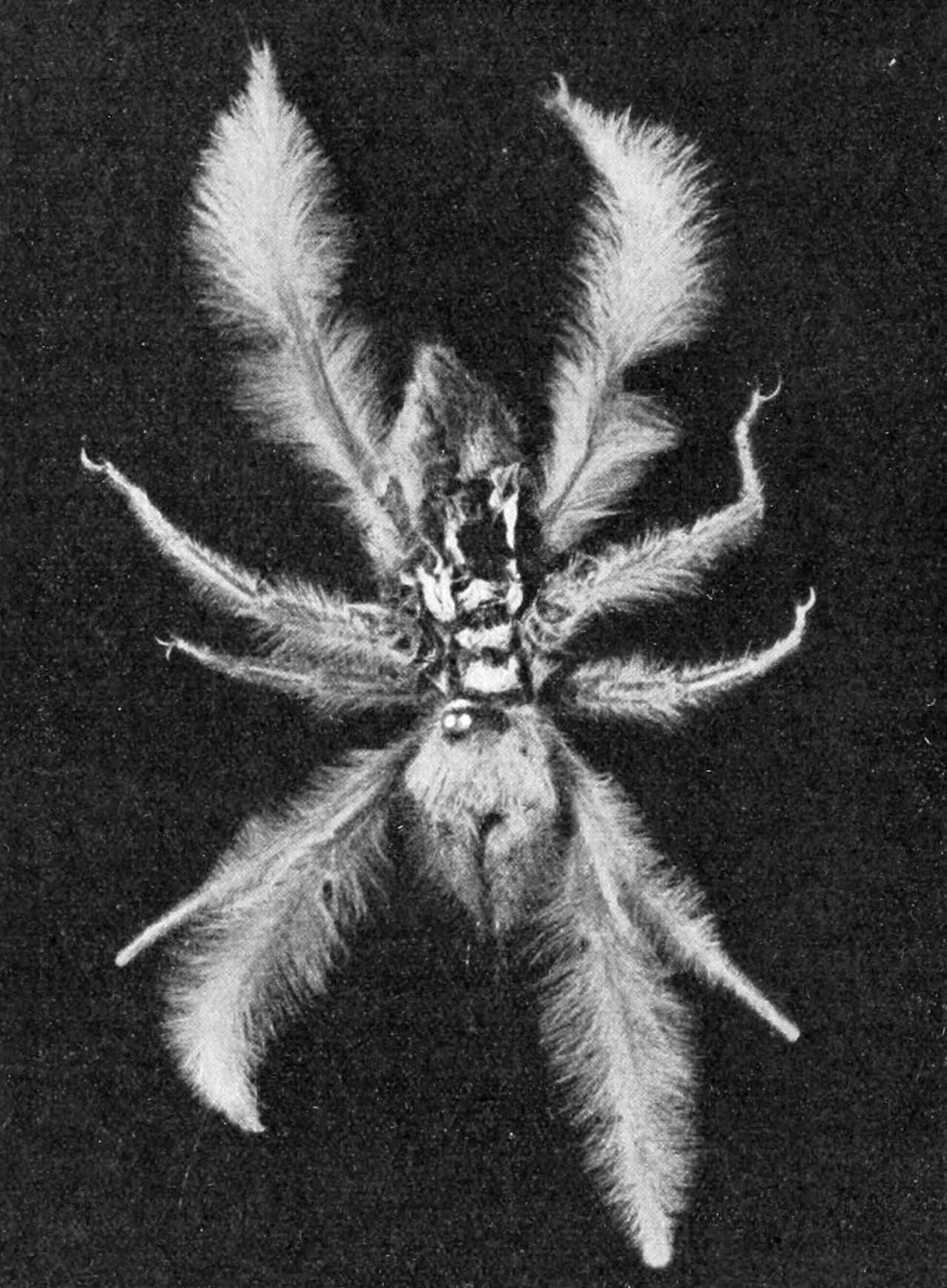
Paragaleodes salaris is a species in this genus

Paragaleodes is a genus of galeodid camel spiders (solifuges), first described by Karl Kraepelin in 1899.

== Species ==
As of February 2023, the World Solifugae Catalog accepts the following twelve species:

- Paragaleodes erlangeri Kraepelin, 1903 — Ethiopia
- Paragaleodes fulvipes Birula, 1905 — Iran, Israel
- Paragaleodes judaicus Kraepelin, 1899 — Israel, Syria
- Paragaleodes melanopygus Birula, 1905 — Azerbaijan, Iran, Turkmenistan
- Paragaleodes nesterovi Birula, 1916 — Azerbaijan, Iran, Iraq
- Paragaleodes occidentalis (Simon, 1885) — Algeria, Mauritania, Morocco
- Paragaleodes pallidus (Birula, 1890) — Kazakhstan, Kyrgyzstan, Turkmenistan, Uzbekistan
- Paragaleodes scalaris (C.L. Koch, 1842) — Algeria, Egypt, Ethiopia, Saudi Arabia, Somalia, Turkmenistan, Yemen
- Paragaleodes sericeus Kraepelin, 1899 — Egypt
- Paragaleodes spinifer Birula, 1938 — Tajikistan or Uzbekistan
- Paragaleodes tunetanus Kraepelin, 1899 — Tunisia
- Paragaleodes unicolor (Birula, 1905) — Iran, Israel
