= Paragaleodiscus =

Scientific classification
- Kingdom: Animalia
- Phylum: Arthropoda
- Subphylum: Chelicerata
- Class: Arachnida
- Order: Solifugae
- Family: Galeodidae
- Genus: Paragaleodiscus; Birula, 1941
- Species: P. aflagellatus

Binomial name
- Paragaleodiscus aflagellatus Birula, 1941

Genus of camel spiders

Paragaleodiscus is a monotypic genus of Galeodid camel spiders, first described by Aleksei Birula in 1941. Its single species, Paragaleodiscus aflagellatus is distributed in Yemen.
