= Othoes (arachnid) =

Scientific classification
- Domain: Eukaryota
- Kingdom: Animalia
- Phylum: Arthropoda
- Subphylum: Chelicerata
- Class: Arachnida
- Order: Solifugae
- Family: Galeodidae
- Genus: Othoes; Hirst, 1911

Type species
- Othoes floweri Hirst, 1911

Species
- 5, see text

Genus of camel spiders

Othoes is a genus of Galeodid camel spiders, first described by Arthur Hirst in 1911.

== Species ==
As of February 2023, the World Solifugae Catalog accepts the following five species:

- Othoes floweri Hirst, 1911 — Sudan
- Othoes hirsti Lawrence, 1954 — Saudi Arabia
- Othoes rimmonensis Panouse, Levy & Shulov, 1967 — Israel
- Othoes saharae Panouse, 1960 — Algeria, Mauritania
- Othoes vittatus Hirst, 1912 — Israel
