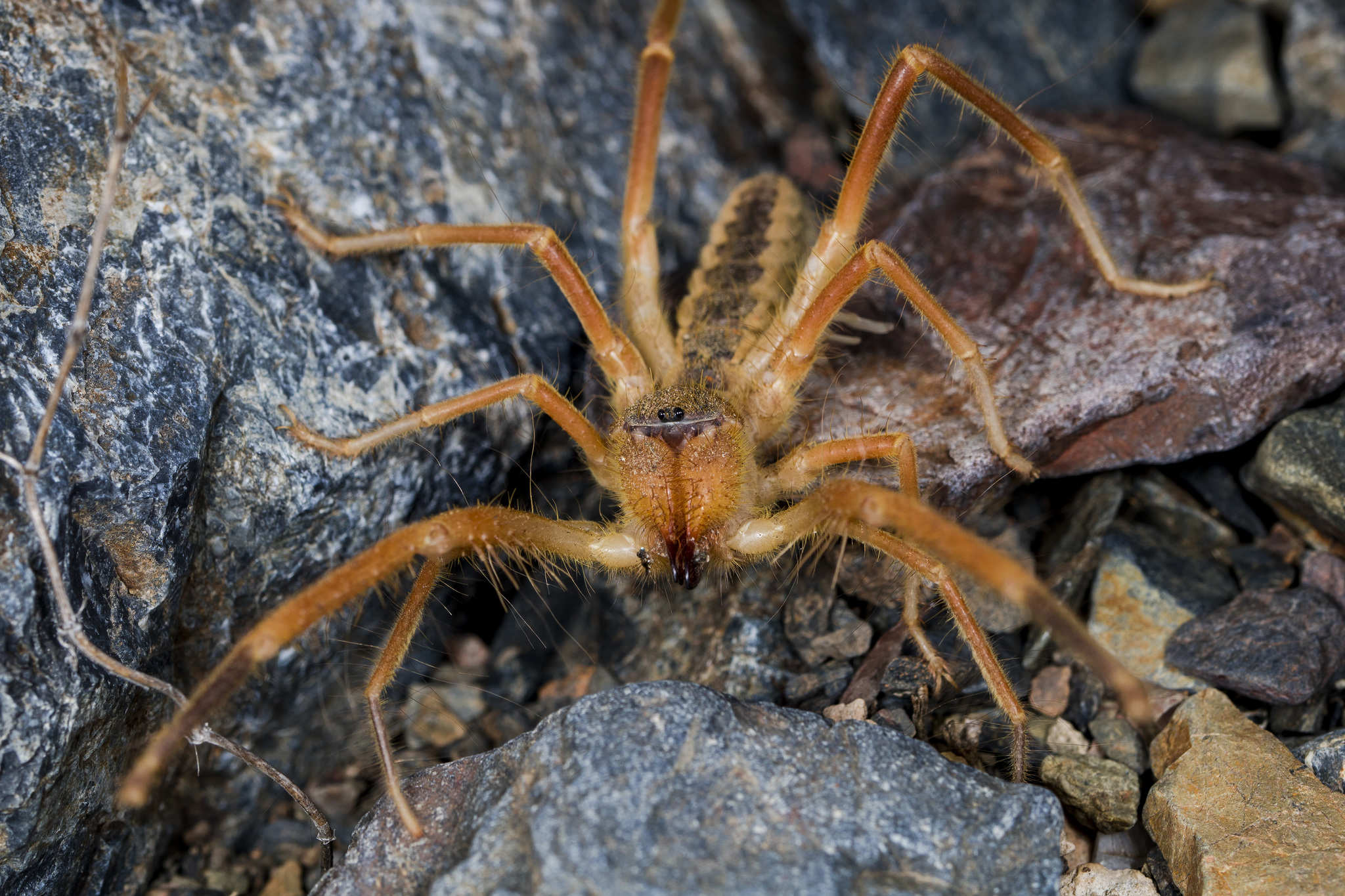
- Galeodes caspius

Scientific classification
- Kingdom: Animalia
- Phylum: Arthropoda
- Subphylum: Chelicerata
- Class: Arachnida
- Order: Solifugae
- Family: Galeodidae
- Genus: Galeodes; Olivier, 1791

Type species
- Galeodes araneoides (Pallas, 1772)

Species
- 174, see text

= Galeodes =

Genus of camel spiders

Galeodes is a genus of solifuges or sun spiders. The nearly 200 species in this genus are found in northern Africa, southeastern Europe and Asia. Like other solifuges, they are mainly nocturnal and found in arid habitats. They often have long hairy appendages and are not as stout bodied or dark and contrastingly coloured as some other solifuges. Some Galeodes species are able to produce sounds by stridulation. These are usually raspy or hiss-like and may be imitations of the sounds of vipers, to serve a defensive function. As in other solifuges, mating involves the male depositing a spermatogonia that is manipulated into the female genital opening using their chelicera. The male strokes the female using the palps allowing her to be approached. Females will often feed on males before or after mating. The female then deposits the eggs in a burrow in soil and in some species guards them.

== Species ==
As of October 2022, the World Solifugae Catalog accepts the following 174 species:

- Galeodes abessinicus Roewer, 1934 — Ethiopia
- Galeodes adamsi (Turk, 1947) — Iraq
- Galeodes afghanus Pocock, 1895 — Afghanistan, Pakistan
- Galeodes agilis Pocock, 1895 — India
- Galeodes anatoliae Turk, 1960 — Turkey
- Galeodes annandalei Hirst, 1908 — India, Pakistan
- Galeodes arabs C.L. Koch, 1842 — North Africa, Middle East
- Galeodes araneoides (Pallas, 1772) — Middle East, Turkmenistan, Afghanistan, Kazakhstan, Ukraine, Armenia, Azerbaijan
- Galeodes armeniacus Birula, 1929 — Turkey, Armenia, Azerbaijan
- Galeodes ater (Roewer, 1960) — Afghanistan
- Galeodes atriceps Roewer, 1934 — Iran, Israel
- Galeodes atroluteus (Roewer, 1960) — Afghanistan
- Galeodes atrospinatus (Roewer, 1941) — Pakistan
- Galeodes aulicus Hirst, 1908 — Iran
- Galeodes auronitens Birula, 1905 — Iran
- Galeodes australis Pocock, 1900 — India
- Galeodes babylonicus Roewer, 1934 — Iraq, Israel
- Galeodes bacillatus Birula, 1905 — Iran
- Galeodes bacillifer Pocock, 1900 — Afghanistan, Iran, Pakistan
- Galeodes bacilliferoides Roewer, 1934 — Iran, Iraq, Pakistan
- Galeodes bactrianus Birula, 1937 — Kazakhstan, Tajikistan, Uzbekistan
- Galeodes barbarus Lucas, 1849 — North Africa
- Galeodes belutschistanus (Roewer, 1934) — Afghanistan, Pakistan
- Galeodes bengalicus (Roewer, 1934) — India
- Galeodes bicolor Roewer, 1934 — Israel, Pakistan
- Galeodes blanchardi Simon, 1891 — Algeria, Libya, Morocco, Togo, Tunisia
- Galeodes bocharicus Roewer, 1934 — Uzbekistan
- Galeodes bogojavlenskii Birula, 1906 — Iraq, Israel, Tajikistan, Uzbekistan
- Galeodes bubi Birula, 1937 — Uzbekistan
- Galeodes caspius Birula, 1890 — Central Asia, Azerbaijan, China, Iran, Israel
- Galeodes chitralensis Hirst, 1908 — Pakistan
- Galeodes citrinus Pocock, 1895 — Iran, Pakistan
- Galeodes clavatus Roewer, 1934 — Tunisia
- Galeodes claviger Kraus, 1959 — Iran
- Galeodes conversus Roewer, 1934 — Azerbaijan, Turkey
- Galeodes crassichelis Roewer, 1934 — Tunisia
- Galeodes ctenogaster (Roewer, 1934) — India
- Galeodes ctenoides Roewer, 1934 — Iran
- Galeodes cursor (Roewer, 1934) — Pakistan
- Galeodes dahlahensis Harvey, 2002 — Afghanistan
- Galeodes darendensis Harvey, 2002 — Turkey
- Galeodes darius Pocock, 1895 — Iraq, Israel
- Galeodes dekanicus (Roewer, 1934) — India
- Galeodes dellacaveae Harvey, 2002 — Somalia
- Galeodes discolor Kraepelin, 1899 — Iran
- Galeodes distinctus (Roewer, 1934) — Lebanon
- Galeodes edentatus Benoit, 1964 — Sudan
- Galeodes egregius Roewer, 1934 — Azerbaijan
- Galeodes elegans Roewer, 1934 — North Macedonia
- Galeodes ephippiatus Roewer, 1941 — Iran
- Galeodes excelsius (Lawrence, 1956) — Afghanistan
- Galeodes fatalis (Lichtenstein, 1796) — Afghanistan, Bangladesh, India
- Galeodes fessanus (Roewer, 1934) — Libya
- Galeodes festivus Hirst, 1908 — Iran
- Galeodes flavivittatus (Roewer, 1934) — Algeria
- Galeodes forcipatus Roewer, 1934 — Turkey
- Galeodes franki (Kraus, 1959) — Iran
- Galeodes fremitans (Roewer, 1934) — Pakistan
- Galeodes fumigatus Walter, 1889 — Iran, Turkmenistan
- Galeodes graecus C.L. Koch, 1842 — Armenia, Bulgaria, Cyprus, Egypt, Greece, Syria, Turkey
- Galeodes granti Pocock, 1903 — Egypt, Ethiopia, Israel, Sudan, Syria, Yemen
- Galeodes gravelyi (Roewer, 1934) — India
- Galeodes gromovi Harvey, 2002 — Azerbaijan, Iraq, Turkey
- Galeodes hakkariensis Erdek, 2021 — Turkey
- Galeodes hellenicus Roewer, 1934 — Greece
- Galeodes indicus Pocock, 1900 — India
- Galeodes inermis (Caporiacco, 1941) — Ethiopia
- Galeodes insidiator (Roewer, 1934) — Yemen
- Galeodes interjectus (Roewer, 1960) — Afghanistan
- Galeodes intermedius (Frade, 1948) — Guinea-Bissau
- Galeodes interritus Roewer, 1934 — Iran
- Galeodes karunensis Birula, 1905 — Iran
- Galeodes kermanensis Birula, 1905 — Iran
- Galeodes koeiena Lawrence, 1956 — Afghanistan
- Galeodes kozlovi Birula, 1911 — China, Mongolia, Turkmenistan, Uzbekistan
- Galeodes kraepelini Roewer, 1934 — Egypt
- Galeodes krausi Harvey, 2002 — Iran
- Galeodes lacertosus Roewer, 1934 — Iraq, Saudi Arabia, Yemen
- Galeodes laevipalpis Birula, 1905 — Uzbekistan
- Galeodes laniator Roewer, 1934 — Iraq, Israel
- Galeodes lapidosus Roewer, 1934 — Turkey
- Galeodes lawrencei Harvey, 2002 — Iraq
- Galeodes levyi Harvey, 2002 — Israel, Saudi Arabia, Syria
- Galeodes limitatus (Roewer, 1960) — Afghanistan
- Galeodes lindbergi Roewer, 1960 — Afghanistan
- Galeodes litigiosus Roewer, 1934 — Yemen
- Galeodes loeffleri Roewer, 1952 — Iran
- Galeodes luteipalpis (Roewer, 1960) — Afghanistan
- Galeodes lybicus Roewer, 1941 — Libya
- Galeodes lycaonis Turk, 1960 — Turkey
- Galeodes macmahoni Pocock, 1900 — Afghanistan, Iran, Pakistan
- Galeodes marginatus Roewer, 1961 — Turkey
- Galeodes mauryi Harvey, 2002 — Afghanistan
- Galeodes medusae Turk, 1960 — Egypt
- Galeodes melanalis Roewer, 1934 — Pakistan
- Galeodes melanopalpus (Roewer, 1934) — Pakistan
- Galeodes minimus Roewer, 1934 — Morocco
- Galeodes minitor Roewer, 1934 — Morocco
- Galeodes mongolicus Roewer, 1934 — Mongolia
- Galeodes montivagans Roewer, 1934 — China
- Galeodes mosconibronzii (Caporiacco, 1937) — Somalia
- Galeodes nachitschevanicus Aliev, 1985 — Azerbaijan
- Galeodes nigrichelis (Roewer, 1934) — Azerbaijan
- Galeodes notatus (Roewer, 1960) — Afghanistan
- Galeodes olivieri Simon, 1879 — Algeria, Mauritania, Morocco, Niger, Senegal, Togo, Tunisia
- Galeodes orientalis Stoliczka, 1869 — Syria, India
- Galeodes pallescens Hirst, 1908 — India
- Galeodes palpalis Roewer, 1934 — Tunisia
- Galeodes parvus Roewer, 1934 — Pakistan
- Galeodes perotis Roewer, 1934 — Cameroon
- Galeodes philippovi (Birula, 1941) — Yemen
- Galeodes philippoviczi Birula, 1937 — Turkmenistan
- Galeodes pinkasi Turk, 1960 — Jordan
- Galeodes pirzadanus (Lawrence, 1956) — Afghanistan
- Galeodes pococki Birula, 1905 — Iran, Pakistan
- Galeodes przevalskii Birula, 1905 — China, Kazakhstan, Uzbekistan
- Galeodes pugnator (Roewer, 1934) — Pakistan
- Galeodes pusillus (Roewer, 1934) — Algeria, Israel
- Galeodes rapax (Roewer, 1934) — Kyrgyzstan or Uzbekistan, China, Kazakhstan
- Galeodes reimoseri Roewer, 1934 — Ethiopia
- Galeodes revestitus Roewer, 1934 — Morocco
- Galeodes rhamses Roewer, 1934 — Egypt
- Galeodes rhodicola Roewer, 1941 — Greece
- Galeodes roeweri Turk, 1948 — Israel
- Galeodes rufogriseus (Roewer, 1960) — Afghanistan
- Galeodes rufulus Pocock, 1900 — Pakistan, India
- Galeodes ruptor Roewer, 1934 — Greece, Turkey
- Galeodes sabulosus Pocock, 1900 — India, Pakistan
- Galeodes sarpolensis Harvey, 2002 — Afghanistan
- Galeodes schach Birula, 1905 — Turkey, Iran
- Galeodes schendicus Roewer, 1934 — Sudan
- Galeodes scythicus Roewer, 1934 — Uzbekistan or Turkmenistan
- Galeodes sedulus Roewer, 1934 — China
- Galeodes sejugatus (Roewer, 1934) — Kyrgyzstan or Uzbekistan, China, Kazakhstan
- Galeodes separandus Roewer, 1934 — Turkey
- Galeodes setipes Birula, 1905 — Uzbekistan
- Galeodes setulosus Birula, 1937 — Tajikistan, Uzbekistan
- Galeodes signatus Roewer, 1934 — Pakistan
- Galeodes simplex Roewer, 1934 — Tunisia
- Galeodes smirnovi Birula, 1937 — Turkmenistan, Uzbekistan
- Galeodes somalicus Roewer, 1934 — Somalia
- Galeodes spectabilis (Roewer, 1934) — Pakistan
- Galeodes starmuehlneri Roewer, 1952 — Iran
- Galeodes striatipalpis (Roewer, 1960) — Afghanistan
- Galeodes subbarbarus Caporiacco, 1941 — Ethiopia
- Galeodes subsimilis Roewer, 1934 — Turkey
- Galeodes sulfuripes Roewer, 1934 — Iraq, Israel
- Galeodes sulphureopilosus Birula, 1905 — Tajikistan, Uzbekistan
- Galeodes tangkharzarensis Harvey, 2002 — Afghanistan
- Galeodes tarabulus (Roewer, 1934) — Libya
- Galeodes taurus (Roewer, 1934) — Turkey
- Galeodes testaceus (Roewer, 1960) — Afghanistan
- Galeodes theodori Turk, 1960 — Egypt
- Galeodes tillmani (Whittick, 1939) — Somalia
- Galeodes timbuktus (Roewer, 1934) — Mali, Nigeria
- Galeodes toelgi Werner, 1922 — Turkey
- Galeodes trichotichnus (Roewer, 1934) — Iran
- Galeodes trinkleri (Roewer, 1934) — Afghanistan
- Galeodes tripolitanus (Roewer, 1934) — Libya, Morocco
- Galeodes truculentus Pocock, 1899 — Iran
- Galeodes turanus Roewer, 1934 — Uzbekistan
- Galeodes turcmenicus Birula, 1937 — Azerbaijan, Kazakhstan, Turkmenistan
- Galeodes turkestanus Kraepelin, 1899 — Kazakhstan, Turkmenistan, Uzbekistan
- Galeodes turki Harvey, 2002 — India
- Galeodes tuxeni (Lawrence, 1956) — Afghanistan
- Galeodes uzbecus Roewer, 1941 — Kazakhstan, Tajikistan, Uzbekistan
- Galeodes veemi Whittick, 1939 — Egypt
- Galeodes venator Simon, 1879 — Algeria, Morocco, Tunisia
- Galeodes ventralis Roewer, 1934 — Yemen
- Galeodes versicolor (Lawrence, 1956) — Afghanistan
- Galeodes viridipilosus Roewer, 1941 — Turkey
- Galeodes vittatus (Roewer, 1941) — Iran
- Galeodes wadaicus Roewer, 1934 — Chad
- Galeodes zarudnyi Birula, 1937 — Kazakhstan, Turkmenistan
