= Zombis =

Scientific classification
- Kingdom: Animalia
- Phylum: Arthropoda
- Subphylum: Chelicerata
- Class: Arachnida
- Order: Solifugae
- Family: Galeodidae
- Genus: Zombis; Simon, 1882
- Species: Z. pusiola

Binomial name
- Zombis pusiola Simon, 1882

Genus of camel spiders

Zombis is a monotypic genus of Galeodid camel spiders, first described by Eugène Simon in 1882. Its single species, Zombis pusiola is distributed in Israel.
