= Galeodopsis =

Scientific classification
- Domain: Eukaryota
- Kingdom: Animalia
- Phylum: Arthropoda
- Subphylum: Chelicerata
- Class: Arachnida
- Order: Solifugae
- Family: Galeodidae
- Genus: Galeodopsis; Birula, 1903

Type species
- Galeodopsis cyrus (Pocock, 1895)

Species
- 5, see text

Genus of camel spiders

Galeodopsis is a genus of Galeodid camel spiders, first described by Aleksei Birula in 1903.

== Species ==
As of February 2023, the World Solifugae Catalog accepts the following five species:

- Galeodopsis bilkjeviczi (Birula, 1907) — Turkmenistan
- Galeodopsis birulae (Hirst, 1912) — Iran
- Galeodopsis cyrus (Pocock, 1895) — Iran, Iraq, Pakistan, Saudi Arabia
- Galeodopsis strandi Birula, 1936 — Turkmenistan
- Galeodopsis tripolitanus (Hirst, 1912) — Libya
