= Gluviema =

Scientific classification
- Domain: Eukaryota
- Kingdom: Animalia
- Phylum: Arthropoda
- Subphylum: Chelicerata
- Class: Arachnida
- Order: Solifugae
- Family: Galeodidae
- Genus: Gluviema; Caporiacco, 1937
- Species: G. migiurtina

Binomial name
- Gluviema migiurtina Caporiacco, 1937

Genus of camel spiders

Gluviema is a monotypic genus of Galeodid camel spiders, first described by Ludovico di Caporiacco in 1937. Its single species, Gluviema migiurtina is distributed in Somalia.
