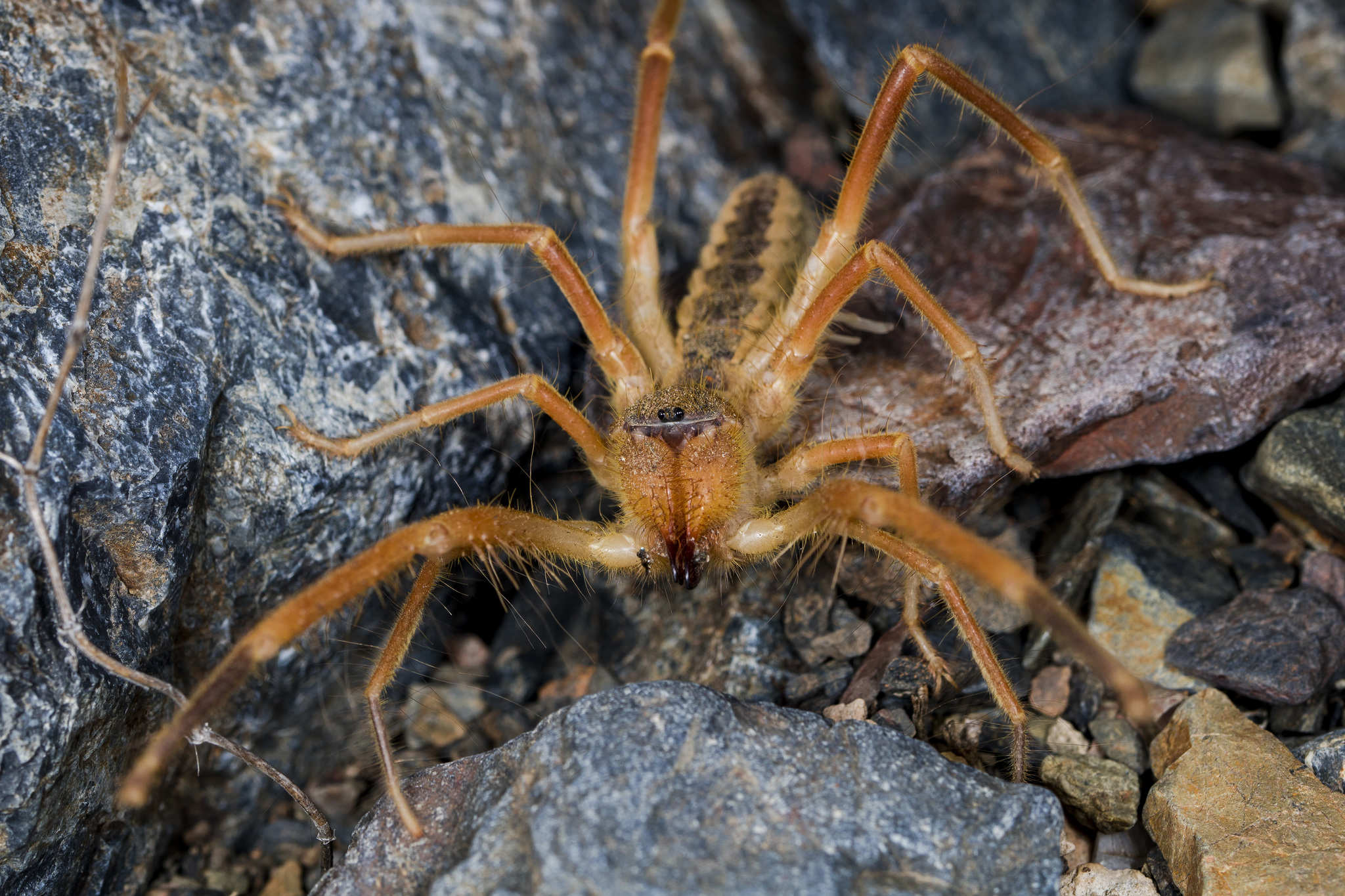
- Galeodes caspius from Kazakhstan

Scientific classification
- Domain: Eukaryota
- Kingdom: Animalia
- Phylum: Arthropoda
- Subphylum: Chelicerata
- Class: Arachnida
- Order: Solifugae
- Suborder: Boreosolifugae
- Family: Galeodidae; Sundevall, 1833

= Galeodidae =

Family of spider-like animals

Galeodidae is a family of solifuges, first described by Carl Jakob Sundevall in 1833.

== Genera ==
As of October 2022, the World Solifugae Catalog accepts the following nine genera:

- Galeodes Olivier, 1791
- Galeodopsis Birula, 1903
- Galeodumus Roewer, 1960
- Gluviema Caporiacco, 1937
- Othoes Hirst, 1911
- Paragaleodes Kraepelin, 1899
- Paragaleodiscus Birula, 1941
- Roeweriscus Birula, 1937
- Zombis Simon, 1882
