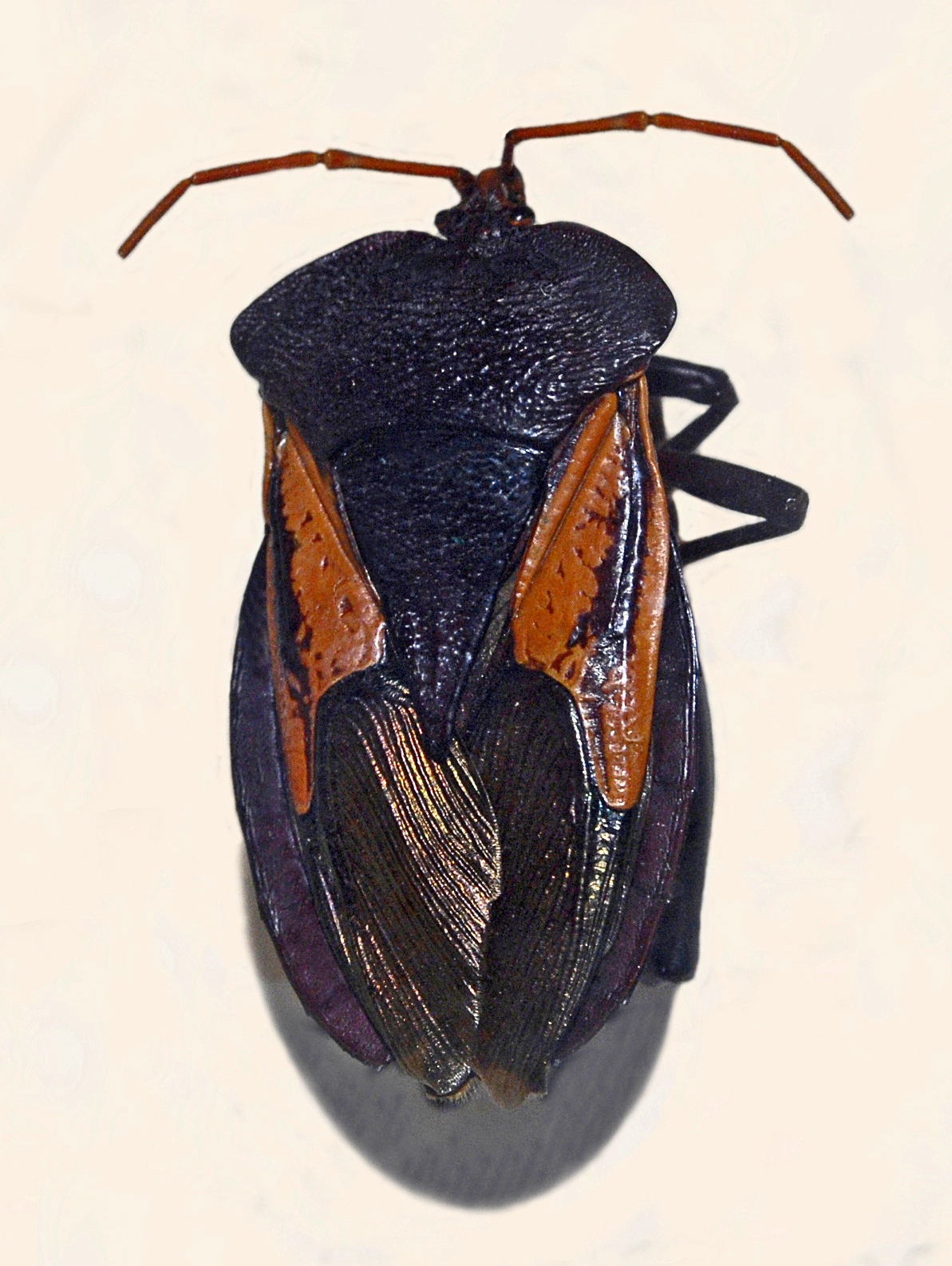
- Oncomeris flavicornis from New Guinea

Scientific classification
- Kingdom: Animalia
- Phylum: Arthropoda
- Clade: Pancrustacea
- Class: Insecta
- Order: Hemiptera
- Suborder: Heteroptera
- Family: Tessaratomidae
- Genus: Oncomeris
- Species: O. flavicornis

Binomial name
- Oncomeris flavicornis (Guérin-Méneville, 1831)

= Oncomeris flavicornis =

Species of true bug

Oncomeris flavicornis is a species of true bugs belonging to the family Tessaratomidae.

== Description ==
Oncomeris flavicornis can reach a length of about 35–41 millimetres (1.4–1.6 in). This bug shows the typical family shield, robust hind legs, a dark brown body with red markings and yellowish antennae (hence the Latin species name flavicornis, meaning golden horn.

== Distribution ==
This species can be found in New Guinea, Indonesia and Queensland, Australia.
