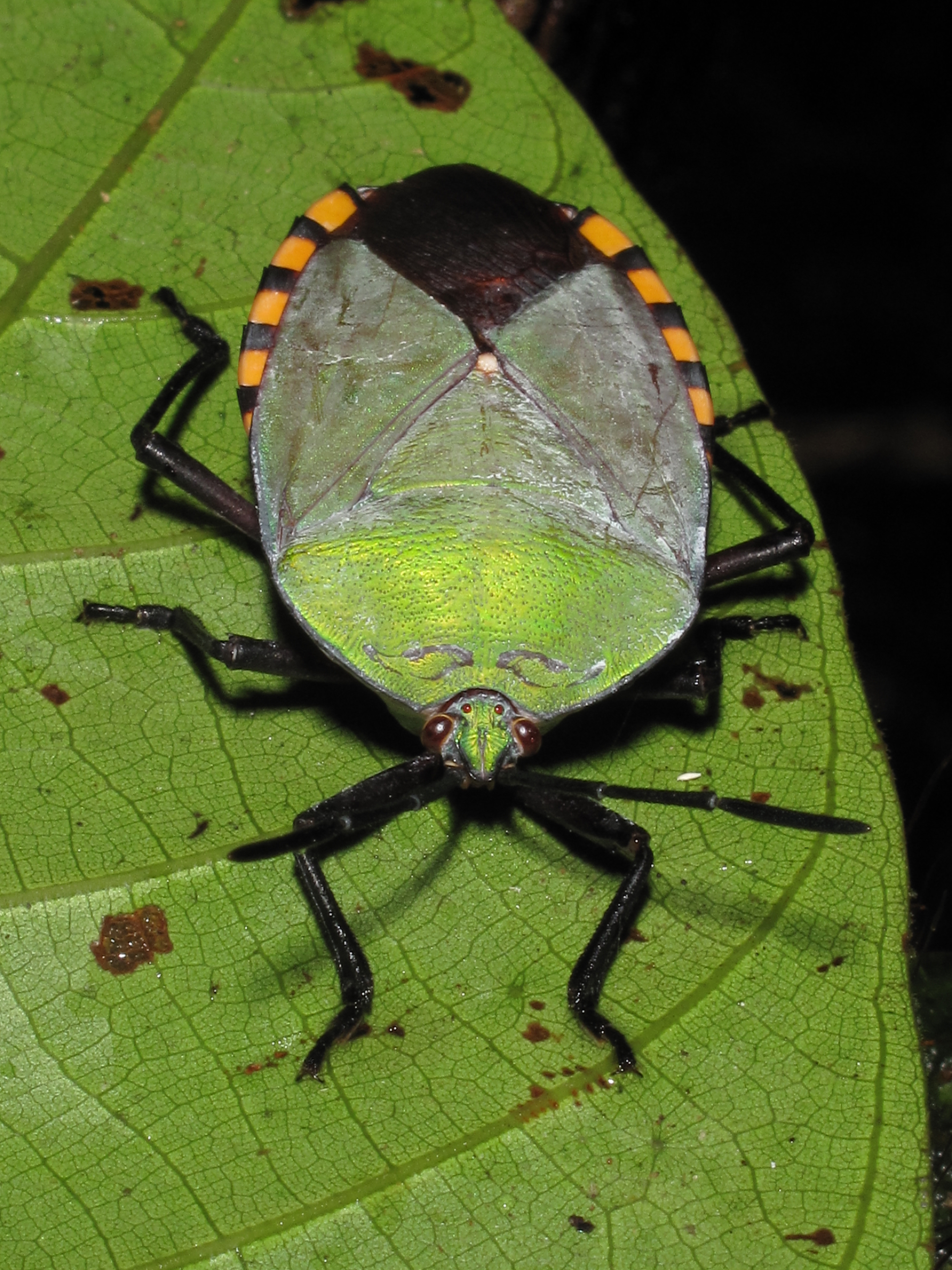
- Pycanum rubens, an adult from the Gunung Mulu National Park, Malaysia

Scientific classification
- Kingdom: Animalia
- Phylum: Arthropoda
- Clade: Pancrustacea
- Class: Insecta
- Order: Hemiptera
- Suborder: Heteroptera
- Infraorder: Pentatomomorpha
- Superfamily: Pentatomoidea
- Family: Tessaratomidae; Stål, 1864

Type genus
- Tessaratoma Lepeletier & Serville, 1825

Subfamilies
- Natalicolinae; Oncomerinae; Tessaratominae

= Tessaratomidae =

Family of true bugs

Tessaratomidae is a family of true bugs. It contains about 240 species of large bugs divided into 3 subfamilies and 56 genera.

Tessaratomids resemble large stink bugs (family Pentatomidae) and are sometimes quite colorful. Most tessaratomids are Old World, with only three species known from the Neotropics. Some members of Tessaratomidae exhibit paternal care of eggs and offspring. The defensive chemicals of certain species can cause significant damage if they come into contact with human skin; they may also cause temporary blindness.

All species are exclusively plant-eaters, some of major economic importance as agricultural pests. A few species are also consumed as food in some countries.

== Description ==
Larger species of Tessaratomidae are known informally as giant shield bugs, giant stink bugs, or inflated stink bugs, but they generally do not have a collective common name and are referred to mostly as tessaratomids.

Tessaratomids are ovate to elongate-ovate bugs. They range in size from the smallest members of the tribe Sepinini at 6 to 7 mm (0.24 to 0.28 in), to the large Amissus atlas of tribe Tessaratomini at 43 to 45 mm (1.7 to 1.8 in). They are generally quite large and usually exceed 15 mm (0.59 in) in length.

The head of tessaratomids is generally small and triangular, with the antennae having 4 to 5 segments (though some of them, for example Siphnus, have relatively large heads). The scutellum, the hard extension of the thorax covering the abdomen, is triangular. It does not cover the leathery middle section of the forewing but is often partially covered by the prothorax. The tarsi (the final segments of the legs) have 2 to 3 segments. Tessaratomids are most reliably distinguished from pentatomids by having six exposed abdominal spiracles instead of five.

Like all hemipterans, instead of mandibles for chewing, tesseratomids possess a piercing-sucking mouthpart for feeding (known as the rostrum). In tesseratomids, the rostrum has 4 segments.

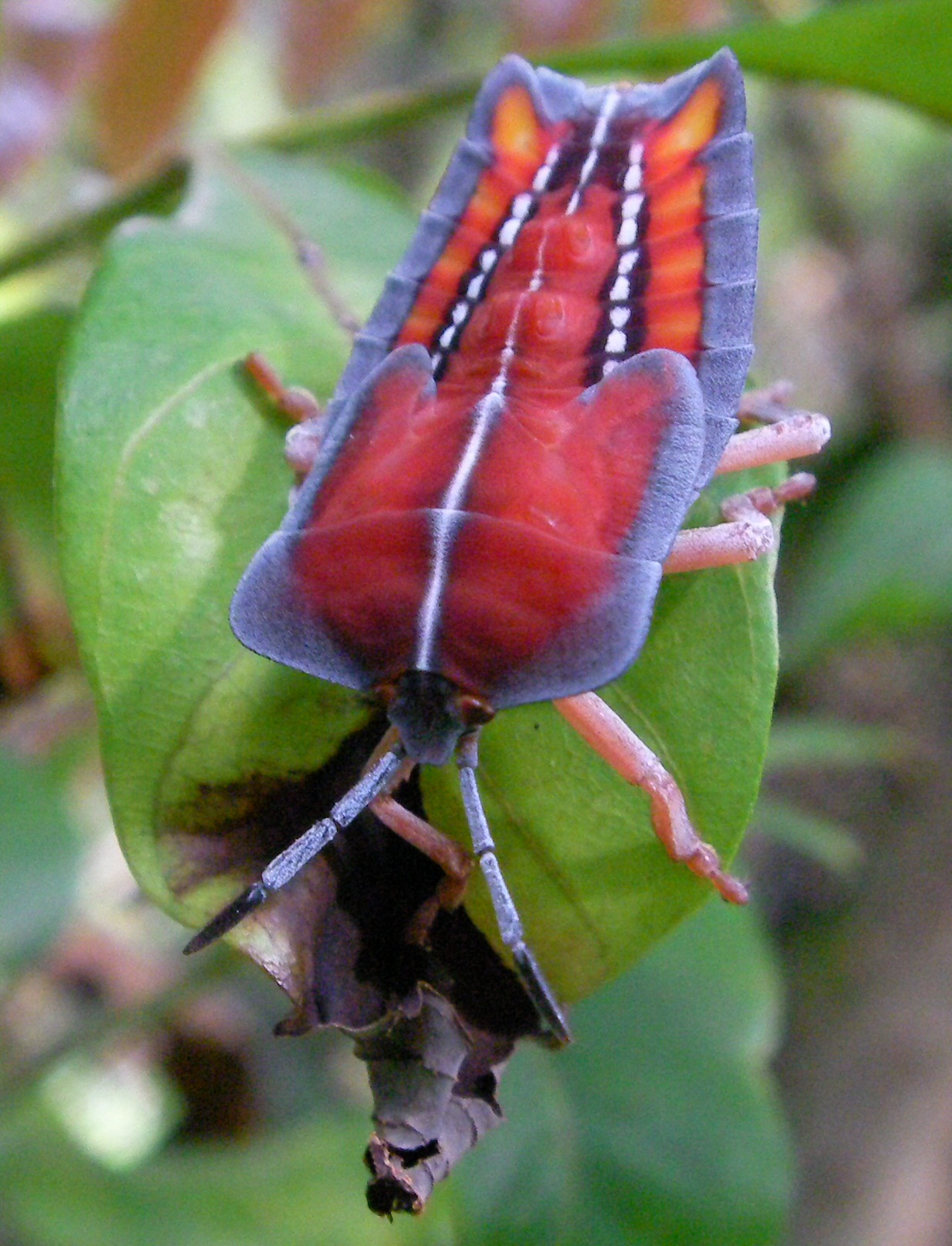
Tessaratoma papillosa nymph displaying vivid coloration.

Tessaratomids are often vividly colored, especially nymphs. Bright greens and reds are common colorations.

== Ecology ==
All tessaratomids are phytophagous. They generally feed upon plants belonging to the plant orders Rosales and Sapindales, and spend most of their lives in tree leaves and stems. They exhibit incomplete metamorphosis and have lifespans that can be several years.

Some tessaratomids guard their eggs and nymphs from predators which may include parasitoid wasps and assassin bugs.

=== Life cycle ===
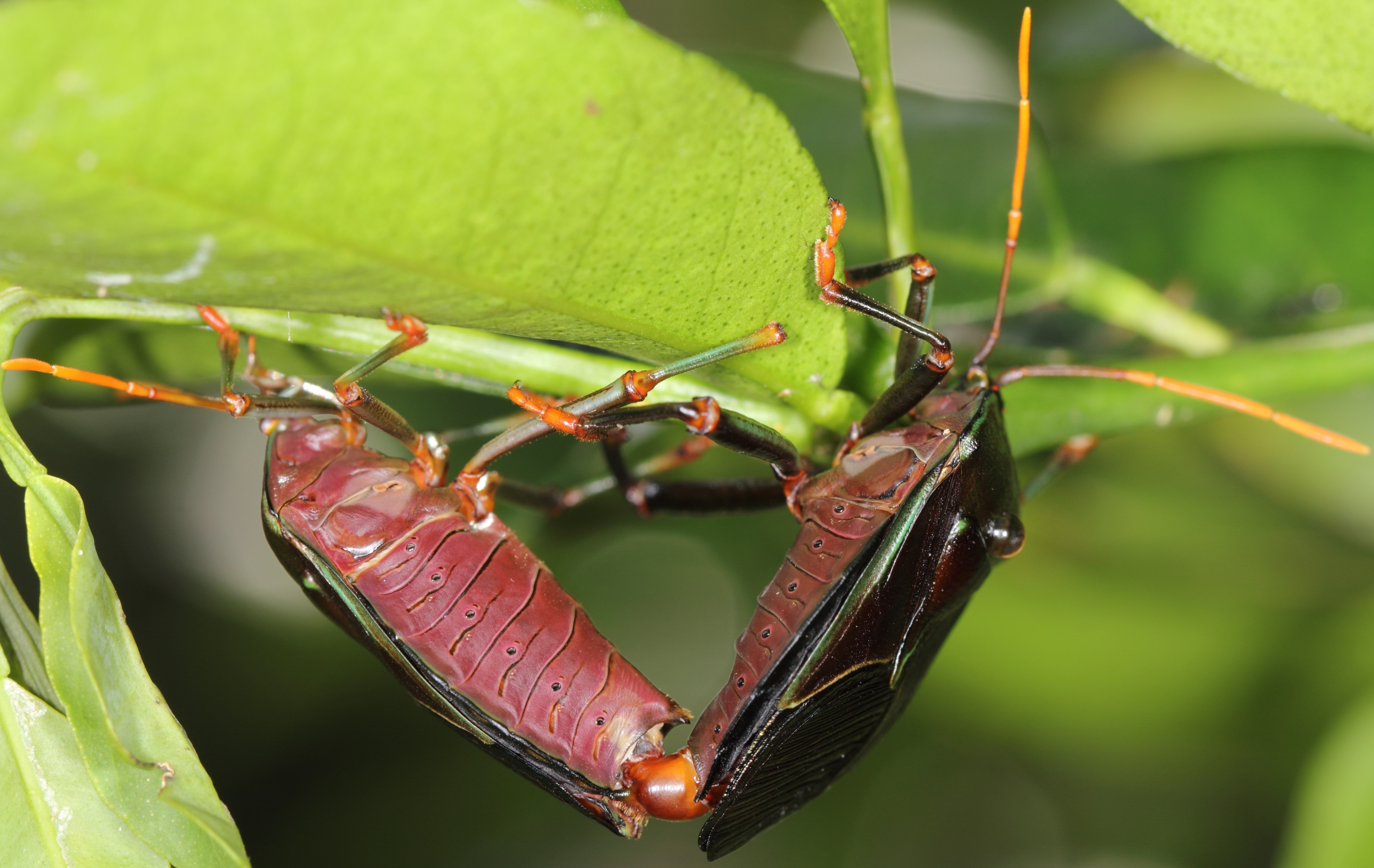
Two bronze orange bugs (Musgraveia sulciventris) mating.

The eggs of tessaratomids are barrel-shaped or globular. The eggs exhibit a ring of small protuberances, known as micropylar process, which permit entry of sperm for fertilization into the eggs (through micropylar canals). They also provide openings for air for the developing embryos.

The eggs are laid in compact clusters glued to the leaves of a variety of plants. The laying arrangement can follow a pattern. For example, in Pygoplatys tenangau, the egg clusters are distinctively hexagonal; while in Piezosternum subulatum, they are arranged in two neat rows. The eggs are usually initially white, cream, or yellow in color but can change as the embryos inside mature.

Nymphs emerge from the eggs through peristaltic movements and with the help of an internal nearly H-shaped structure in the egg known as the 'egg burster'.

As in other hemipterans, tessaratomids are hemimetabolic, undergoing incomplete metamorphosis. This means that they do not possess larval and pupal stages. Instead, juvenile tessaratomids (called nymphs), hatch directly from the eggs. The nymphs resemble fully grown adults except for size and the absence of wings.

Nymphs usually undergo four to five successive stages of moltings (ecdysis), increasing in size and becoming more adult-like with each stage until the final molting. The stages are individually known as instars, with the earliest stage (just after hatching) being known as the first nymphal instar. Nymphs may also differ significantly from adults in colors and patterns exhibited. In some species, nymphs often exhibit strikingly vibrant colors in contrast to the relative drabness of adults. The colors can also vary between instars.

Mating between adults can last for several hours, with the male and female attached end-to-end.

Life cycle of the bronze orange bug (Musgraveia sulciventris)
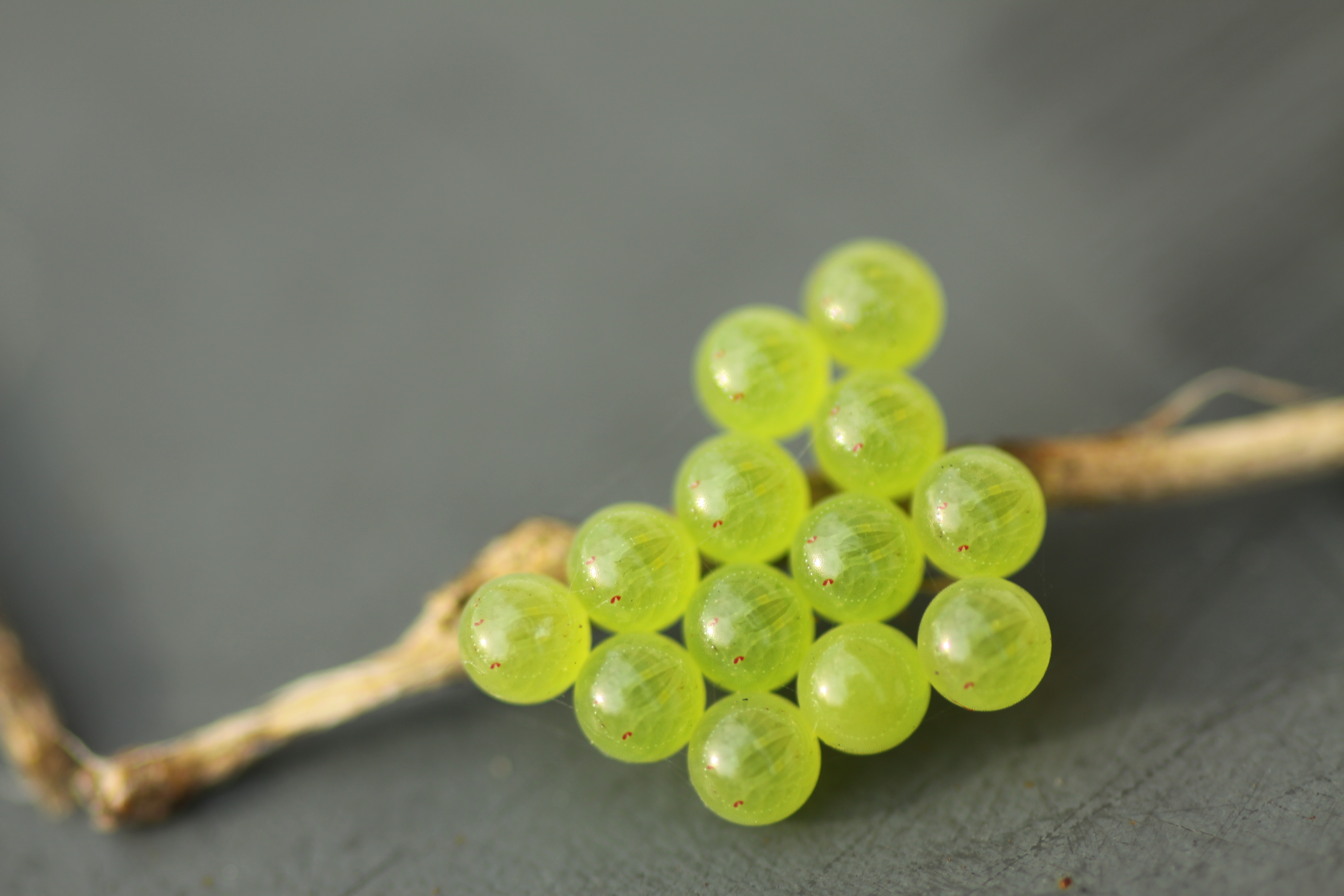
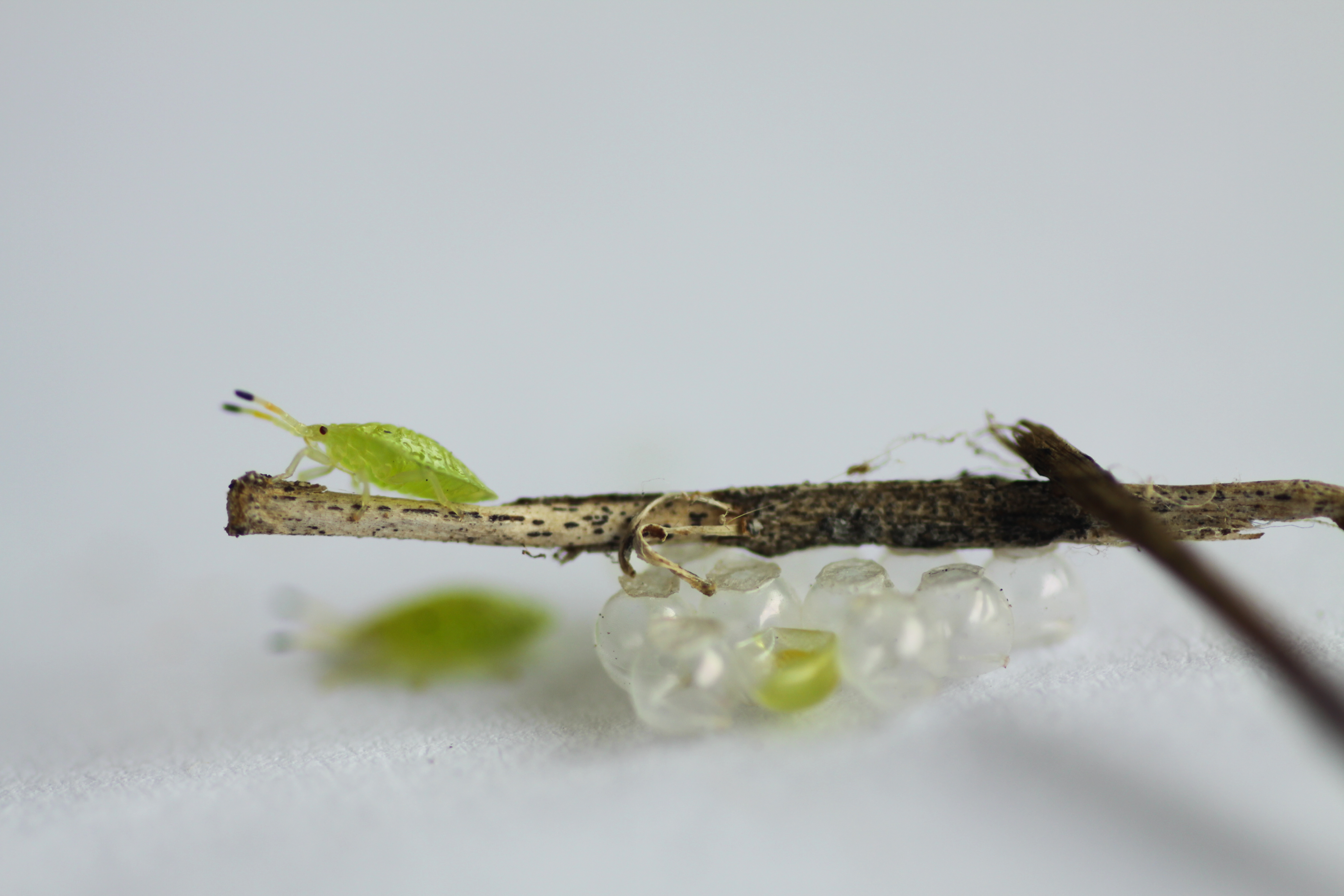
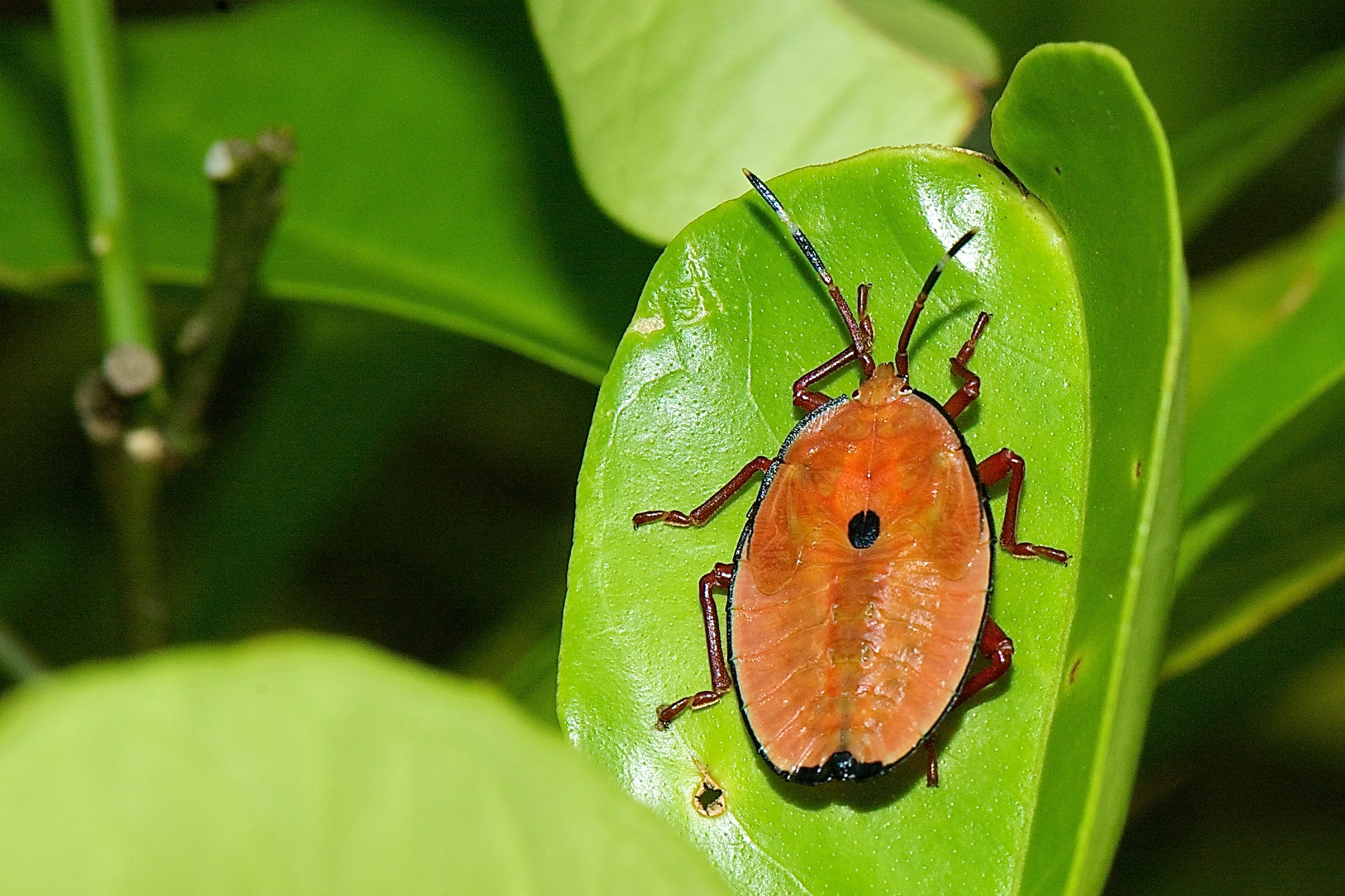
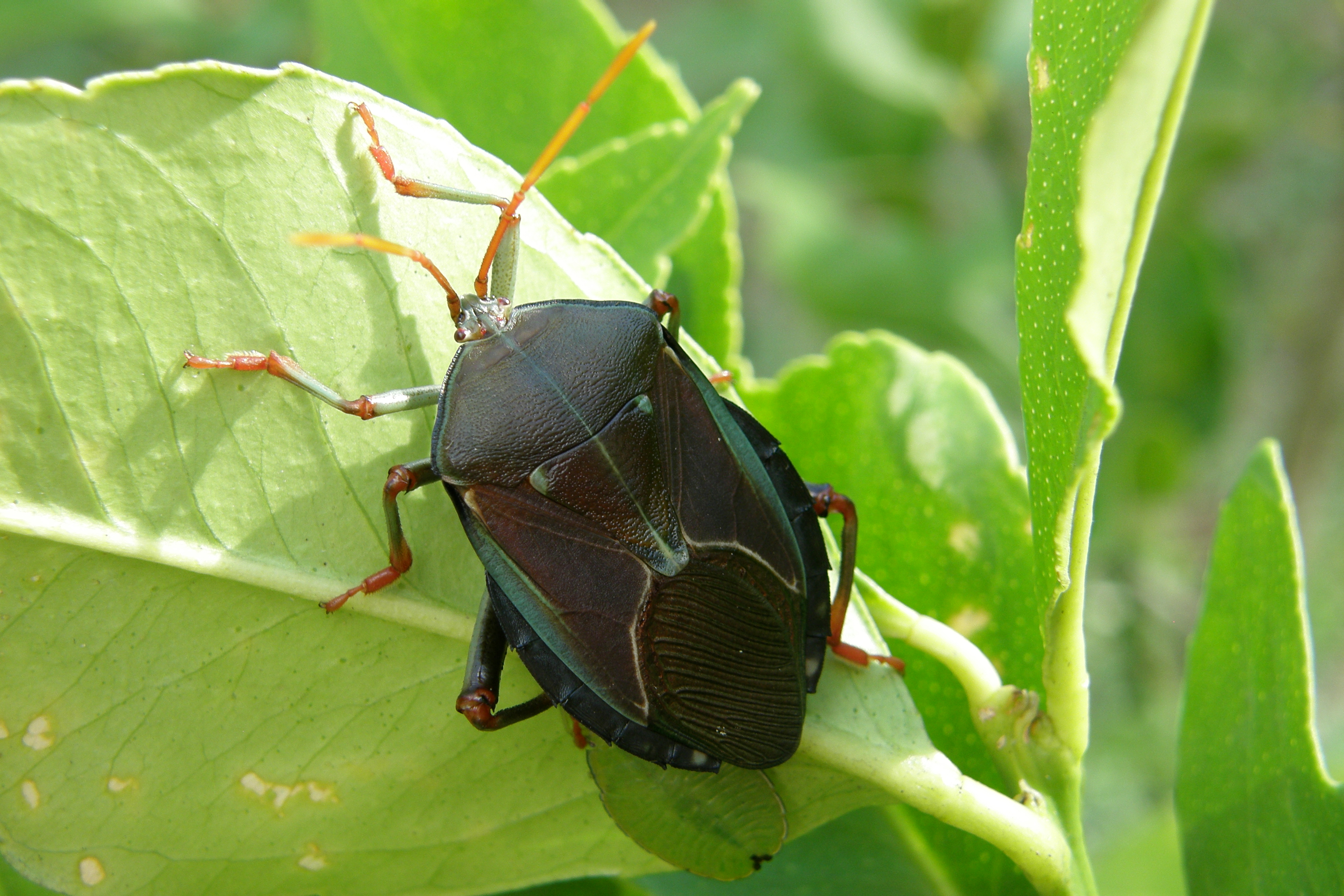
Left: A cluster of bronze orange bug eggs. You can make out the embryos through the clear egg membranes, as well as the small ring of micropylar processes on each egg. The second egg from the bottom right is unfertilized and remains a murky green; Center left: Nymphs emerging from the eggs. Early instars of bronze orange bugs are bright green in color; Center right: A fourth or fifth instar nymph resting on a citrus leaf. It is now brilliantly orange in color with black margins and a small black dot at the center of its body; Right: An adult bronze orange bug on the underside of a citrus leaf. The adults are much drabber in color than the nymphs. Below it is also a green third instar nymph

=== Maternal care ===
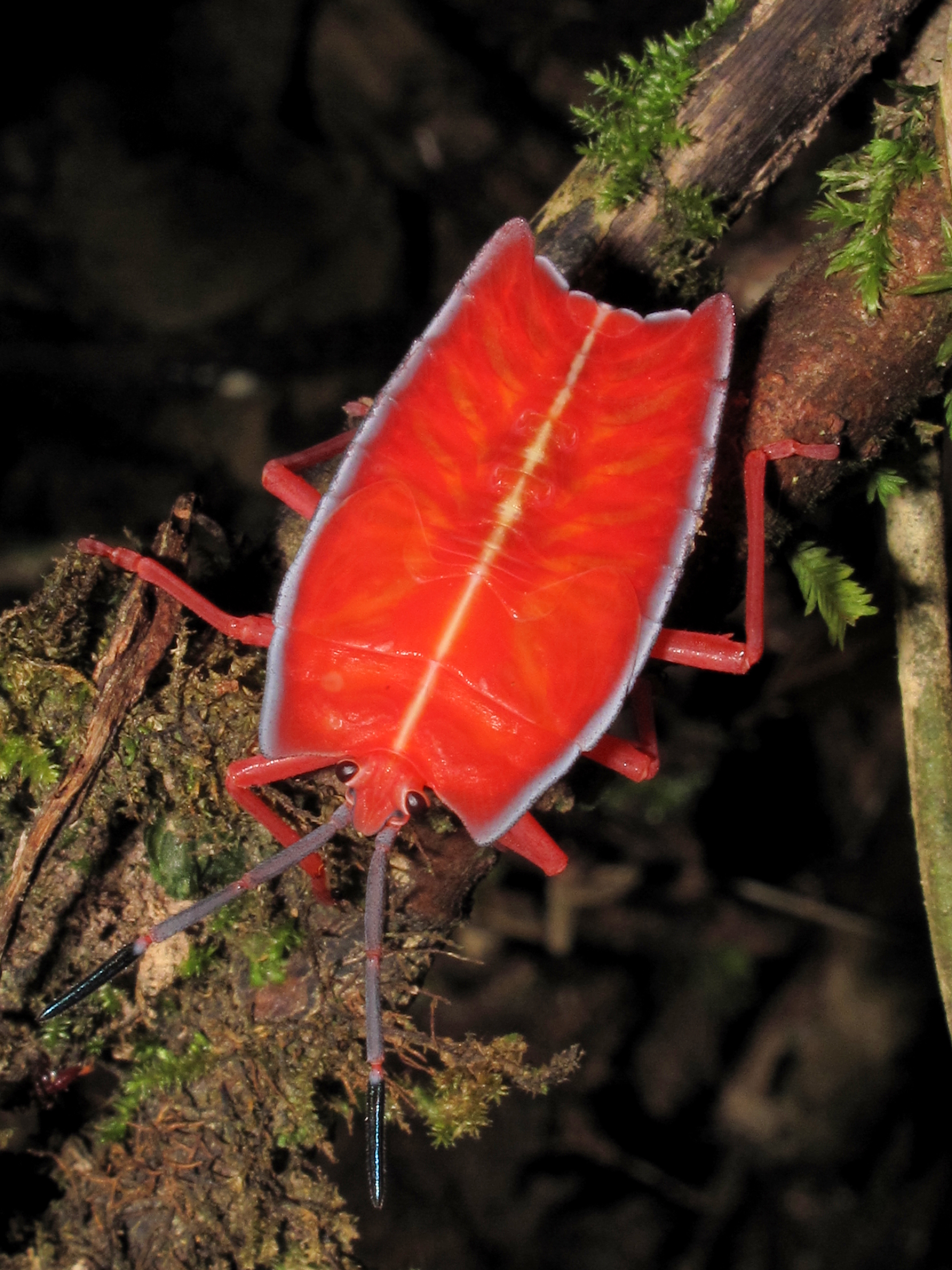
The brilliantly colored and rectangularly shaped nymphs of Pycanum rubens bear little resemblance to the adults.

Maternal care is a well-documented presocial behavior among tessaratomids. Egg guarding by adult females was first observed in 1991 by S. Tachikawa among Japanese species of the genera Pygoplatys (subfamily Tessaratominae) and Erga (subfamily Oncomerinae).

In 1998, Gogala et al. described Tessaratomines of the genus Pygoplatys from Thailand and Malaysia showing egg guarding behavior. In addition, they were also observed to exhibit another remarkable maternal behavior. A dense cluster of small nymphs were photographed being carried around by adult females. The nymphs were firmly clutching unto the bottom side of the abdomens of the adults and to each other, forming a compact mass. The females seemed unimpeded by their burden and were able to walk around normally and even fly. The nymphs, however, were not observed feeding. This behavior is known as "nymphal phoresy" (used adjectivally as "phoretic").

In the Indonesian species Pygoplatys tenangau, females will cover the clutch of 70 to 120 eggs with their bodies after laying them, literally "standing guard" over them. When approached, they will spray defensive liquid at perceived attackers and may buzz their wings. They will not willingly abandon the eggs they are guarding, however, and if picked up will try to hold unto the leaf where their eggs are attached. It usually takes slightly more than two weeks for the eggs to hatch. The hatching process will take up 3 to 4 days, during which the newly hatched nymphs will immediately clamber onto their mother's abdomen. They were observed to remain phoretic for at least 17 days (Magnien et al., 2008).

In the subfamily Oncomerinae, a predominantly Australian group of large colorful bugs, brooding behavior varies from species which do not practice it at all (exhibited by Musgraveia sulciventris) to adult females carrying first and second instar nymphs on their abdomens.

Adult female oncomerines of the genus Lyramorpha will guard nymphs at least to the second instar.

Oncomerines of the genera Cumare, Garceus, and Peltocopta exhibit the most advanced form of maternal care. Like the previously described Southeast Asian Pygoplatys individuals, the females actually carry young nymphs around on their abdomens. As the nymphs grow older, they eventually separate from their mothers, lose their bright colors, and become more solitary prior to molting into adults. Species which exhibit this behavior often have significantly flattened and expanded abdomens.

Of the Australian oncomerines, the bronze orange bug (Musgraveia sulciventris) is the only species unequivocally documented to lack maternal brooding behavior. This peculiarity might be connected to the unreliability of the food plant availability for the species (Monteith, 2011). Unlike other oncomerines who can only lay one egg clutch for the certain amount of time it takes to care for them, M. sulciventris can produce multiple egg clutches rapidly because females don't have to care for them. This allows M. sulciventris to rapidly expand their population when conditions are favorable.

=== Defenses ===
Tesseratomids, like many heteropterans, use chemical defenses (allomones), the source of the common name for pentatomoids - 'stink bugs'. When threatened, tessaratomids may squirt a strong jet of caustic liquid up to a distance of 15 to 27 cm (5.9 to 10.6 in).

The chemicals produced by heteropterans are usually alkanes and aldehydes from glands in the thorax. Compounds that are primarily for protection against fellow arthropods (to which they are lethal). However, the defensive chemicals of tessaratomids (particularly that of Tessaratoma papillosa and Musgraveia sulciventris) are notable for being one of the most debilitating to vertebrates, probably a defense specifically aimed against birds. They can cause damage to human skin and even cause temporary blindness if sprayed unto the eyes.

In Lyramoprha parens, nymphs are also known to be highly gregarious, forming massed feeding groups and moving to new feeding sites in close-packed groups. This behavior, along with their bright colorations and stink glands is believed to help in discouraging potential predators.

Aggregation behavior is also common in adults in some species. Aside from combined chemical defenses, other possible benefits of aggregation include better mating opportunities and shelter, greater retention of moisture and heat, and a possible sense of security. Lone bugs in some species were known to be more likely to be skittish than bugs in groups. However, aggregation can also increase the threats of diseases, parasites, and parasitoids.

If all these defenses fail, tessaratomids will escape predators either by flying away or dropping to the ground (except in cases of females guarding eggs as discussed above).

=== Natural enemies ===
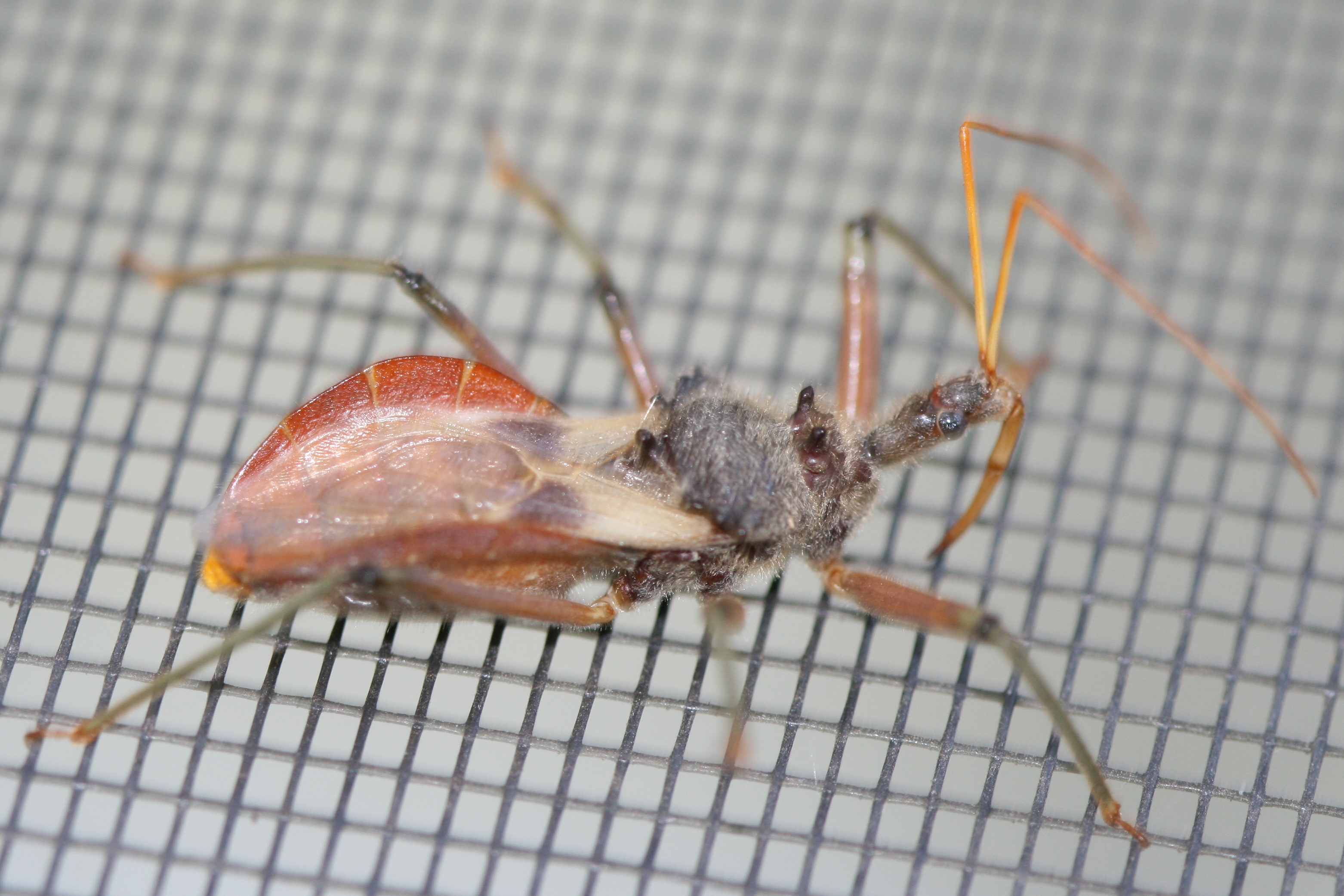
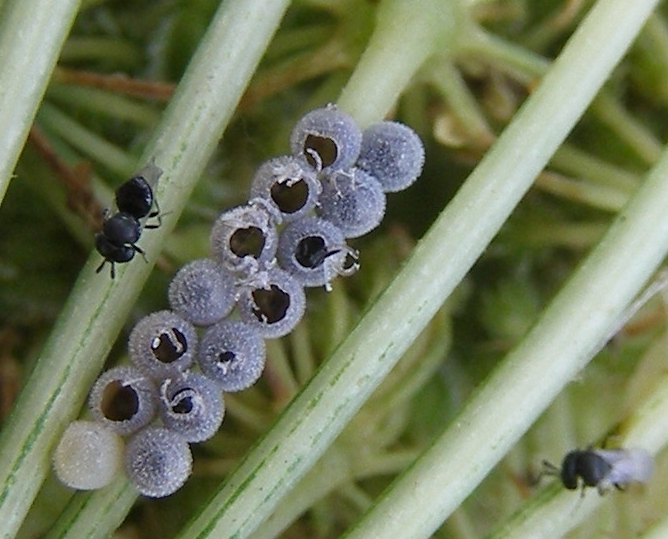
Left: The Australian common assassin bug Pristhesancus plagipennis is a predator of the bronze orange bug Musgraveia sulciventris.
Right: Parasitoid wasps of the genus Trissolcus emerging from the eggs of a pentatomid, Graphosoma italicum.

Natural enemies of tessaratomids include several tiny parasitoid wasps as well as other hemipterans.

Parasitoid wasps that parasitize tessaratomids usually come from the families Eupelmidae, Scelionidae, and Encyrtidae. Adult female parasitoid wasps will search out eggs laid by tessaratomoids. Upon finding some, they will thrust their ovipositors into them and lay eggs inside. The eggs of parasitoid wasps hatch and develop inside the tessaratomid eggs, feeding on the tessaratomid embryo and eventually killing it. Infested eggs characteristically turn darker in color as the wasp larva matures. After about a week, one or more adult wasps will then emerge from the now empty egg.

Musgraveia sulciventris is parasitized by the wasps Eupelmus poggioni and Telenomus spp.; Tessaratoma javanica by the wasps Anastatus colemani and Anastatus kashmirensis(?); and the lychee giant stink bug Tessaratoma papillosa by the wasps Ooencyrtus phongi, Anastatus spp. (particularly Anastatus japonicus), and Trissolcus spp. (particularly Trissolcus latisulcus).

In tessaratomids considered to be agricultural pests (like the Musgraveia sulciventris and Tessaratoma papillosa), the wasps that parasitize them are being studied as potential biological control agents. In the Fujian, Guangdong, and Guangxi provinces of China, mass-reared Anastatus japonicus are being released to combat Tessaratoma papillosa pests in lychee and longan crops. The same measures are also reportedly being done in Thailand.

Musgraveia sulciventris is also preyed upon by the predatory pentatomid Asopus and assassin bugs (family Reduviidae) of the species Pristhesancus papuensis and Pristhesancus plagipennis.

== Economic significance ==
=== As food ===
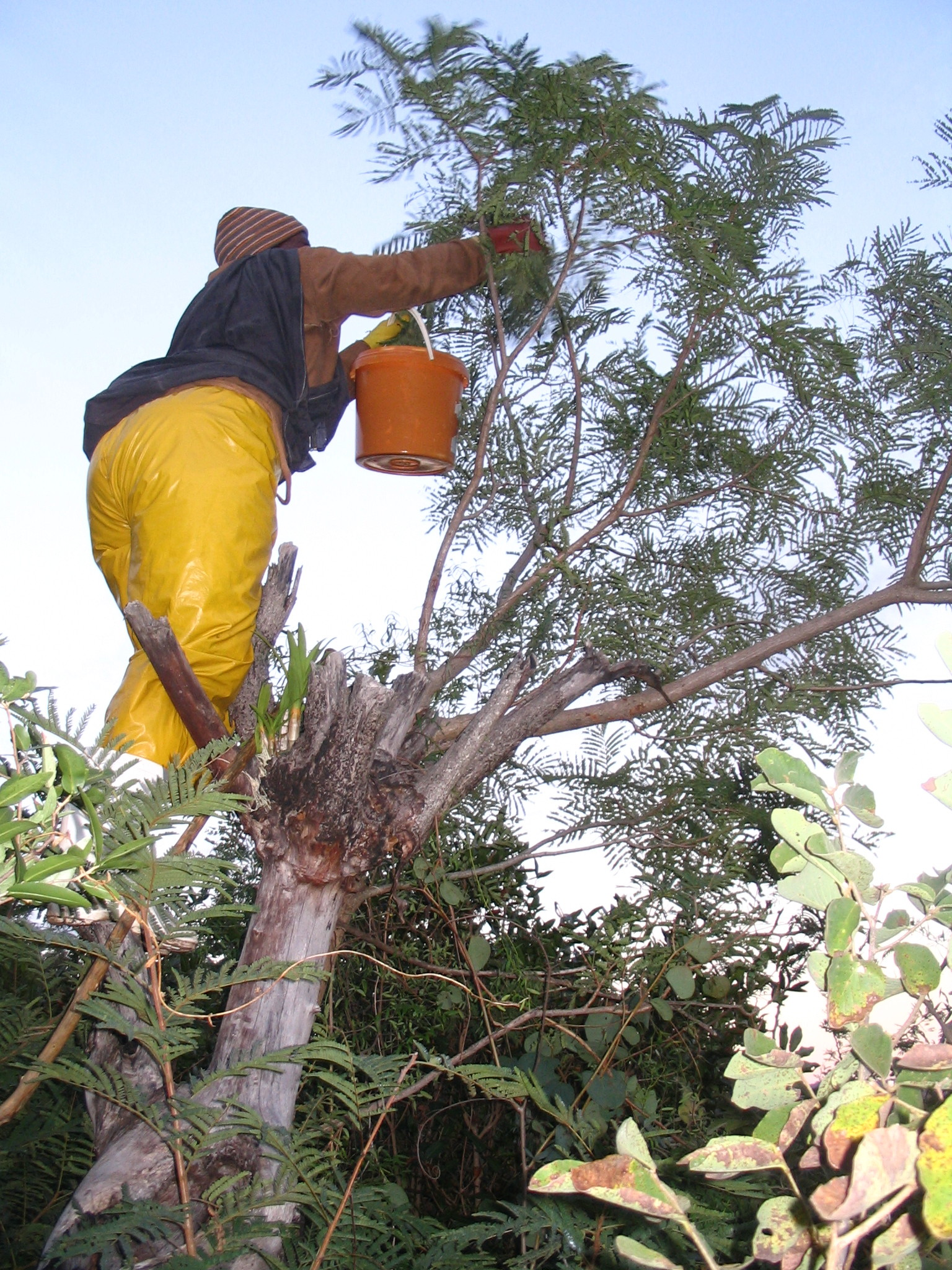
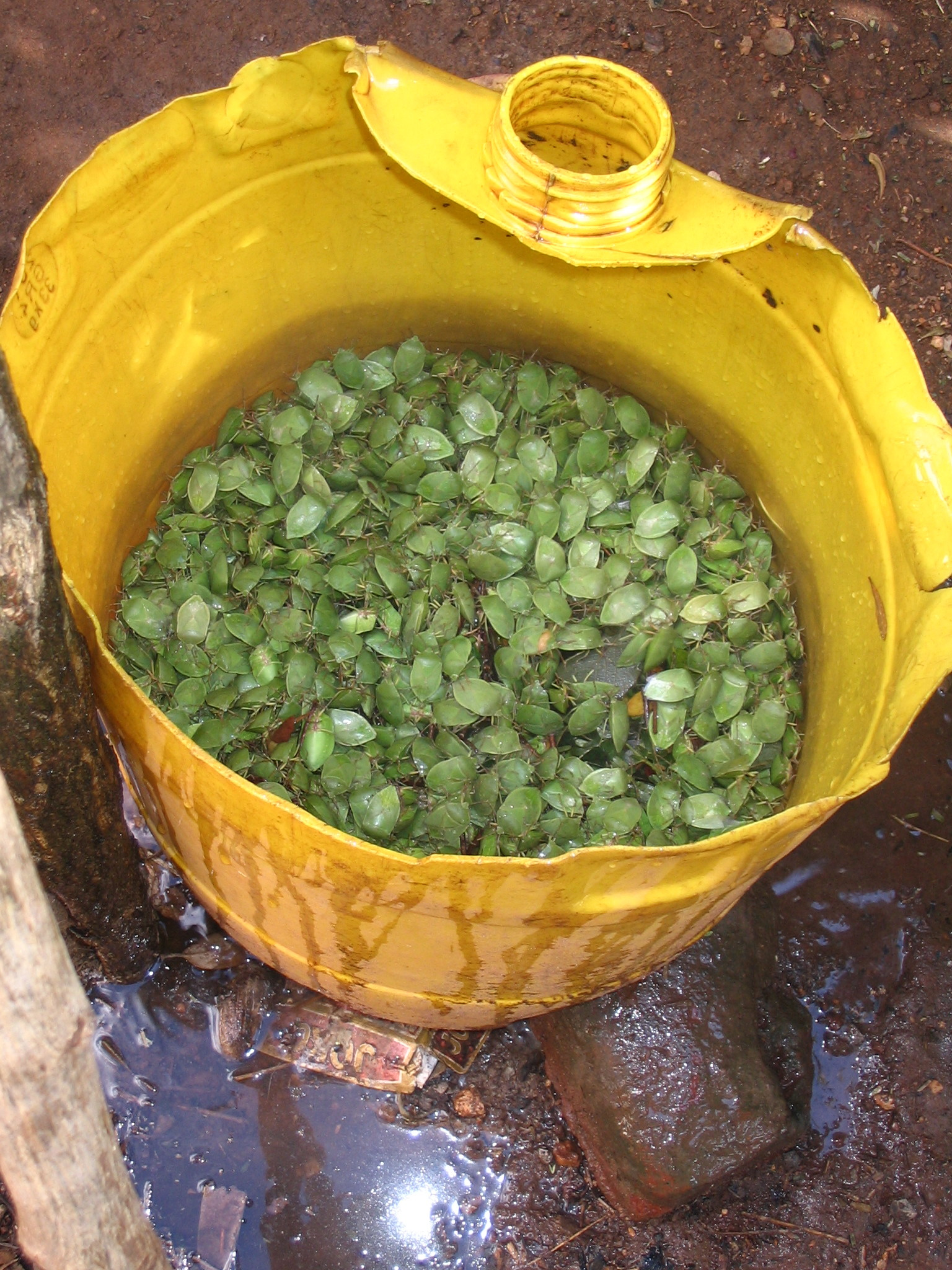
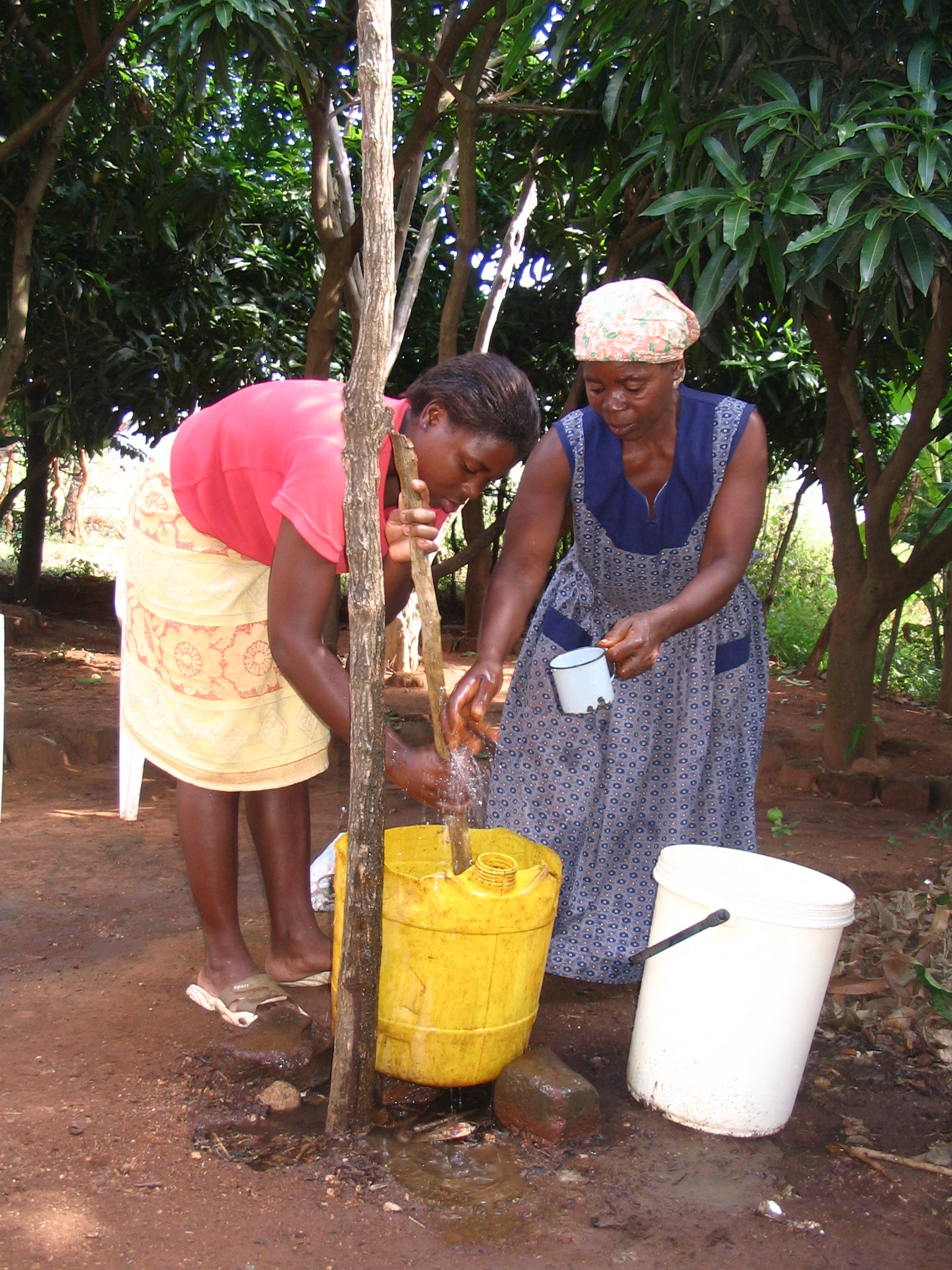
Edible stink bugs (Encosternum delegorguei) are harvested during early morning. They are placed in a bucket with a small amount of warm water and agitated to release their unpalatable defensive chemicals.

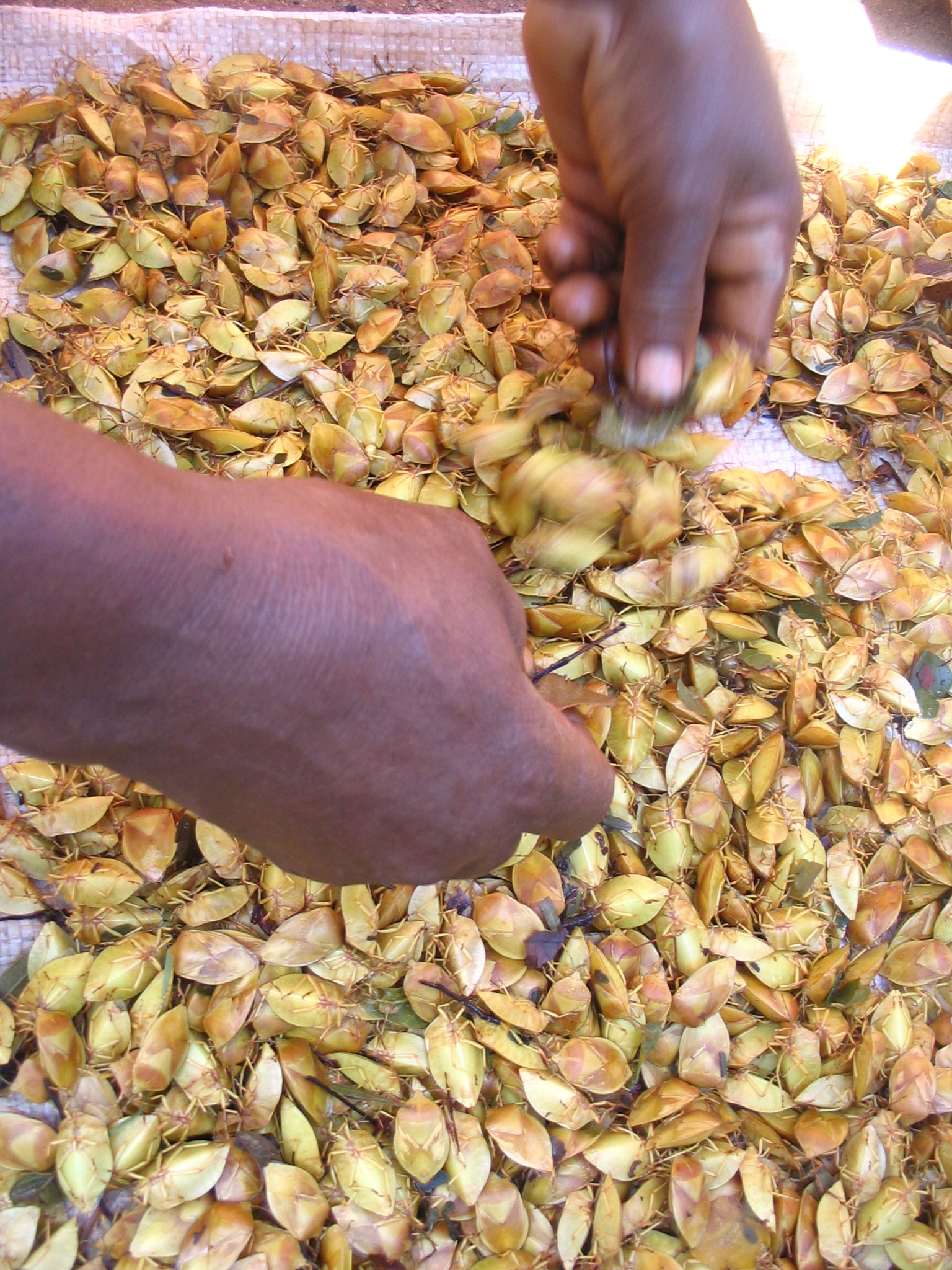
Edible stink bugs (Encosternum delegorguei) being sorted after they had been boiled and dried.

The edible stink bug Encosternum delegorguei is consumed as human food in Zimbabwe and among the Venda people of South Africa. The insects are light green in color and quite large, averaging at 25 mm (0.98 in) in length. They are most widely known in South Africa as "thongolifha", though they are also known as "tsonônô". In Zimbabwe, they are known as "harurwa" or "harugwa".

Encosternum delegorguei are collected just before dawn when they are least active and are easier to catch. They are caught carefully, taking care not to kill them. The chemicals released by the bugs can often stain the hands of collectors orange if they collect them barehanded. The bugs which die during collection are carefully separated from live bugs. This is because the chemicals stored in the stink glands are unpalatable - being extremely bitter. As dead bugs can not release the remaining chemicals in their bodies, they are deemed unsuitable for consumption and discarded. The remaining live bugs are placed in a bucket with a small amount of warm water. This is then carefully agitated so as to make them release all their defense chemicals in alarm. This is repeated several more times until their stink glands are drained.

The live bugs with their now empty stink glands are then boiled in water. Further sorting is done afterwards. Dead bugs which died before they could release all their chemicals can be distinguished from the 'clean' bugs by their blackened abdomens after boiling. These are also rejected. The remaining bugs are then dried under the sun.

In cases where the bugs were collected dead, another method is used to remove the chemicals. The bugs are beheaded and carefully squeezed so chemicals in their stink glands flow out the severed neck. The liquids secreted are then wiped off and the bugs boiled and sun-dried like the previous procedure.

After removing the wings, the dried bugs can be eaten as is, fried with a little salt, or cooked with a type of porridge called pap. They are believed to be a good source of protein.

Diminishing harvests of E. delegorguei has been a cause for concern in recent years. It may be due to the decline in the number of available food plants which are being harvested locally for firewood. Studies are being done in South Africa for ways to ensure sustainable harvests of E. delegorguei, as well as for the possibilities of rearing them in captivity for human consumption.

In Thailand (where a total of 81 insect species are reportedly eaten), large tessaratomids of the genera Pygoplatys and Tessaratoma (T. papillosa and T. javanica) are eaten.

In Laos, Tessaratoma quadrata, locally known as "mien kieng" are also eaten. The same species is also eaten among the Galo people of Northeast India where they are known as "tari". Only adults are consumed. The wings are removed and the bugs eaten raw or cooked into chutney.

=== As agricultural pests ===
Lychee giant stink bugs, Tessaratoma papillosa, are destructive pests of lychee trees (Litchi chinensis) in China. They also feed on the closely related Sapindaceae fruit trees like longan (Dimocarpus longan) and rambutan (Nephelium lappaceum). The closely related Tessaratoma quadrata and Tessaratoma javanica are also minor pests of apple, pear, and lychee trees.

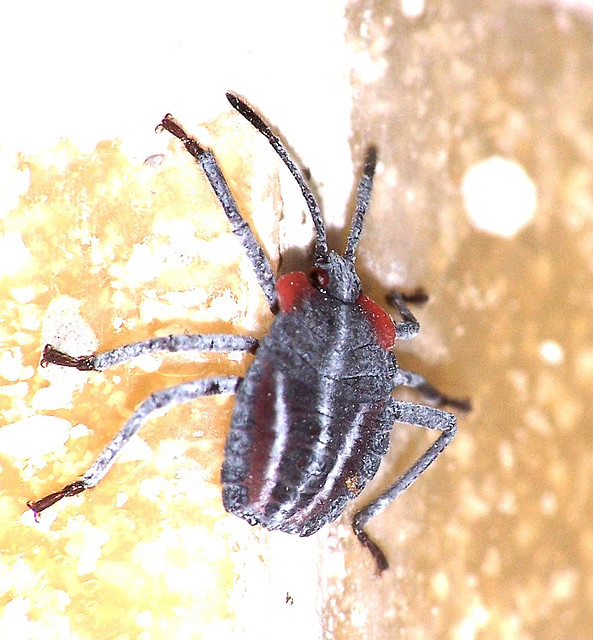
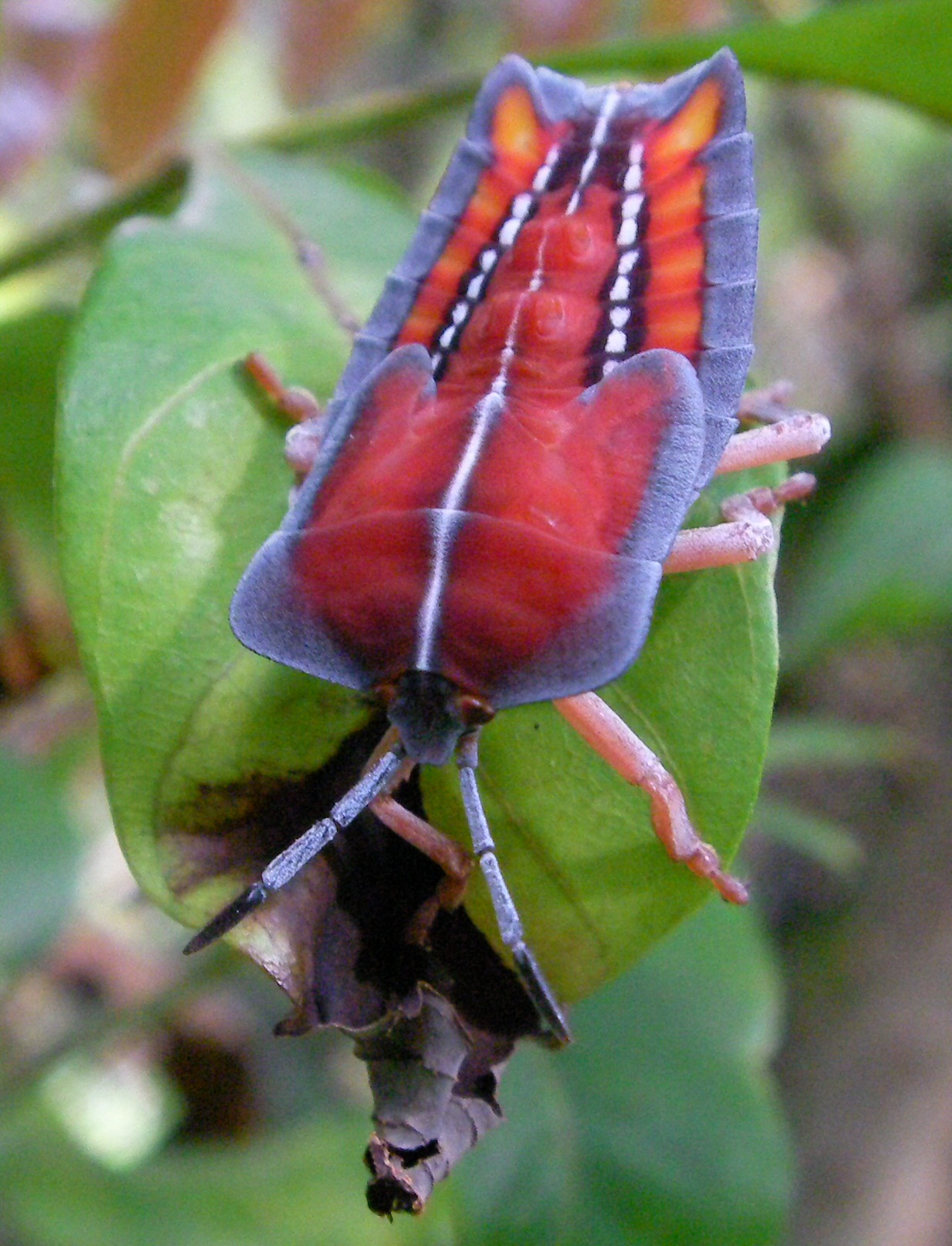
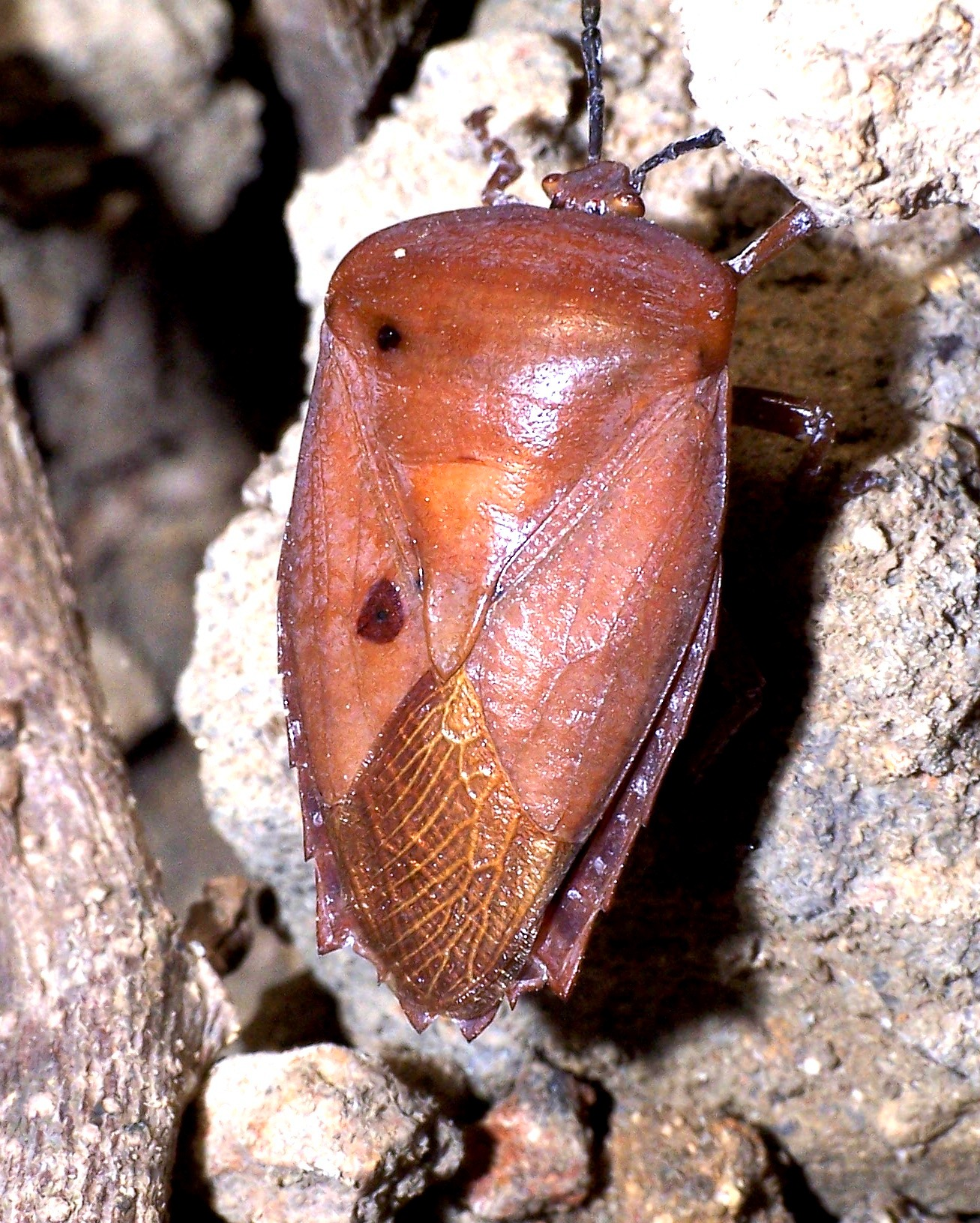
Top left: A first instar nymph of the lychee giant shield bug (Tessaratoma papillosa) from China; Right: Vividly colored older nymph of the same species; Bottom left: The drably colored adult.

Bronze orange bugs (Musgraveia sulciventris) are serious pests to citrus crops in Australia. They are very large bugs, around 20 mm (0.79 in) in length, whose native host plants are members of the rue family, Rutaceae.

In Indonesia, the tessaratomid Pygoplatys tenangau, locally known as the "tenangau", is considered to be one of the most important pests of Damar gardens. Damar gardens are cultivated forests of trees of the genera Shorea, Balanocarpus, or Hopea used as a source of Damar resin. P. tenangau is the only known tessaratomid which feeds on Dipterocarpaceae.

In Papua New Guinea, Agapophyta viridula and Agapophyta similis are regarded as pests of Tephrosia spp. and pigeon peas (Cajanus cajan). Agapophyta bipunctata are known minor pests of coconuts (Cocos nucifera) and sago (Metroxylon sagu) as well.

== Classification and distribution ==
Tessaratomidae was first described as a family group by the Swedish entomologist Carl Stål in 1864. In 1900, the Hungarian entomologist Géza Horváth divided the family into 9 tribes and established a key to determining genera. The English entomologist George Willis Kirkaldy increased the number of subfamilies under Tessaratomidae to 11 in 1909. Dennis Leston (1955) followed Kirkaldy's system but reclassified some tribes to subtribes. The current classification is based on the work of Pramod Kumar in 1969 who reduced the number of subfamilies to three - Natalicolinae, Oncomerinae, and Tessaratominae; with Tessaratominae being further divided into three tribes - Prionogastrini, Sepinini, and Tessaratomini. Subsequent revisions by Sinclair (1989), Rolston et al. (1993), Schuch & Slater (1995), Sinclair (2000), Cassis & Gross (2002), and Rider (2006), are all based upon Kumar's system.

Tessaratomidae is classified under order Hemiptera (true bugs), suborder Heteroptera, infraorder Pentatomomorpha, and superfamily Pentatomoidea (shield bugs and stink bugs). It is currently divided into three subfamilies: Natalicolinae (with 8 genera), Oncomerinae (with 15 genera), and Tessaratominae (with 33 genera and one of uncertain placement).

They are mostly found in tropical Africa, Asia, and Oceania though a few species can be found in the Neotropics and Australia. There are about 240 species known.

Listed below are the three subfamilies; their authors and type genera; the tribes, subtribes, and genera classified under them; and their distribution ranges:

=== Natalicolinae ===
Authority: Stål, 1870 - type genus: Natalicolina Spinola, 1850

1. Cyclogastridea - Equatorial and West Africa
2. Elizabetha - Equatorial Africa
3. Empysarus - Southern India and Sri Lanka
4. Encosternum - Southern Africa
5. Haplosterna - Equatorial Africa
6. Natalicola - Africa
7. Selenymenum - Equatorial and West Africa
8. Stevesonius - Central Africa

=== Oncomerinae ===
Authority: Stål, 1870 - type genus: Oncomeris Laporte, 1832

1. Agapophyta - Australia, Moluccas, New Guinea, Solomon Islands
2. Cumare - Australia (Queensland)
3. Erga - Australia
4. Garceus - Australia (Queensland)
5. Lyramorpha - Australia, Moluccas, and New Guinea
6. Musgraveia - Australia
7. Neosalica - Myanmar, China, India, Sumatra, and Vietnam
8. Oncomeris - Australia, Lesser Sunda Islands, Moluccas, New Guinea, Sulawesi
9. Peltocopta - Australia
10. Piezosternum - Africa, Cape Verde Islands, Central America and the Caribbean, Madagascar, South America
11. Plisthenes - Australia, New Guinea, Solomon Islands, Southeast Asia
12. Rhoecus - Australia
13. Sciadiocoris - Papua New Guinea
14. Stilida - Australia
15. Tamolia - New Guinea
16. Tibiospina - Australia (Queensland)

=== Tessaratominae ===
Authority: Stål, 1865 - type genus: Tessaratoma Lepeletier & Serville, 1825

Tribe Prionogastrini Stål, 1870

- type genus: Prionogaster Stål, 1853

1. Prionogaster - South Africa

Tribe Sepinini Horváth, 1900

- type genus: Sepina Signoret, 1861

- Subtribe Platytatina Horváth, 1900 - type genus: Platytatus Bergroth, 1892
1. Platytatus - Madagascar
- Subtribe Sepinina Horváth, 1900 - type genus: Sepina Signoret, 1861
1. Ipamu - Central Africa
2. Malgassus - Madagascar
3. Pseudosepina - Madagascar
4. Rhynchotmetus - Madagascar
5. Sepina - Madagascar, Seychelles

Tribe Tessaratomini Stål, 1864

Selected genera:

- Subtribe Eusthenina Stål, 1870 - type genus: Eusthenes Laporte, 1832
  - Asiarcha - China, India, Indochina
  - Candace - Sub-saharan Africa
  - Eurostus - East Asia, South Asia, Southeast Asia
  - Eusthenes - East Asia, South Asia, Southeast Asia
  - Mattiphus - China, Indochina, Philippines, Sri Lanka, Sulawesi, Sumatra
- Subtribe Tessaratomina Stål, 1864 - type genus: Tessaratoma Lepeletier & Serville, 1825
  - Pygoplatys - South and Southeast Asia
  - Siphnus - Southeast Asia
  - Tessaratoma - Africa, Australia, South Asia, East Asia, Southeast Asia

Tribe Notopomini Horváth, 1900 incertae sedis

- type genus: Notopomis Montandon, 1894

1. Notopomus - Malaysia (Pinang Island)

== Evolution ==
=== Fossil record ===
A fossil specimen, named Tesseratomoides maximus and thought to belong to Tessaratomidae, was recovered in 1967 from the Eocene of Germany; but the specimen was published with no formal description and is thus unacceptable as a valid taxon. Another fossil genus, Latahcoris, from the Miocene Latah Formation of Idaho, was described in 1931 by T.D.A. Cockerell.

=== Phylogeny ===
A study on the phylogenetic relationships of the superfamily Pentatomoidea in 2008 hints that Tessaratomidae and Dinidoridae represented a monophyletic group. However, the difficulty in securing enough materials for examination for both groups leaves this as yet unresolved.

Below is the morphological unweighted tree of the superfamily Pentatomoidea after Grazia et al. (2008). Tessaratomidae is in bold. Both Dinidoridae and Tessaratomidae are shown in dotted lines, signifying uncertain status.

- ←
  - Urostylididae
  - - Saileriolidae
    - - Acanthosomatidae
      - - - **Tessaratomidae**
          - Dinidoridae
          - Cydnidaesensu lato
            - Cydnidae
            - Thaumastellidae
            - Parastrachiinae
          - - Thyreocoridae
            - Lestoniidae
            - Phloeidae
            - - Scutelleridae
              - Plataspididae
            - Pentatomidae
            - Canopidae
            - Megarididae

== See also ==
- Defense in insects
- Entomophagy
- Parental investment
