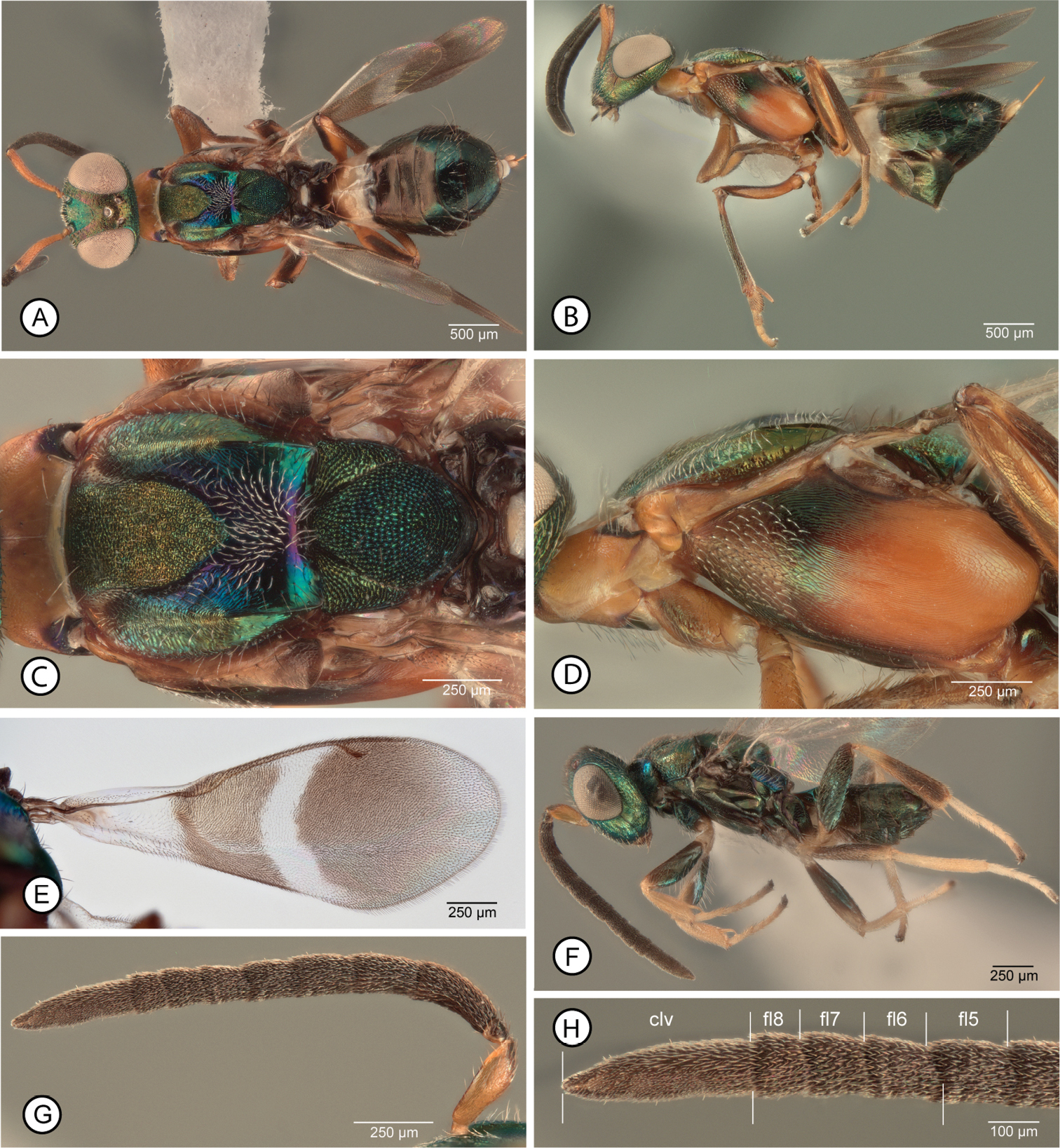

Scientific classification
- Domain: Eukaryota
- Kingdom: Animalia
- Phylum: Arthropoda
- Class: Insecta
- Order: Hymenoptera
- Family: Eupelmidae
- Genus: Anastatus
- Species: A. japonicus

Binomial name
- Anastatus japonicus Ashmead, 1904

Synonyms
- Anastatus japonicus Ashmead, 1904; Anastatus bifasciatus disparis Ruschka, 1921; Anastatus disparis Burgess 1929; Anastatus japonicus Yang et al. 2015

= Anastatus japonicus =

Species of wasps

Anastatus japonicus is a species of parasitic wasp in the family Eupelmidae. It is an egg parasitoid and will parasitize various forestry and agricultural pests such as the brown marmorated stink bug (Halyomorpha halys). The species is widespread and can be found in most countries north of the Equator.

== Parasitic behavior ==
Anastatus japonicus is known to parasitize over 15 different species (see list below) which includes some species of true bugs and butterflies.

Their parasitic behavior can be divided into 10 stages when parasitizing the eggs of the Chinese oak tussar moth (Antheraea pernyi), the only host properly studied. Stage 1 is searching for host eggs, which is done by tapping the substrate with its antennae. Stage 2 involves walking on top of the host egg and feeling around with the antennae, moving them up and down; antennation. Stage 3 is when the antennation stops and the female wasp lowers its abdomen, having located the spot. Then it hovers above the spot with its ovipositor on its way out. Stage 4 is the digging process where it makes the hole by shaking its abdomen. Stage 5 is when it sticks the ovipositor vertically into the egg, piercing the shell and probing. The abdomen will start swaying left and right if the probing is a success. Stage 6 only occurs if the probing is unsuccessful and it involves either giving up or trying harder. Stage 7 consists of oviposition itself and starts with stirring the inside of the egg, then, when the wasp stops stirring and the inside of the host egg becomes stationary, the egg(s) is laid and then the ovipositor is pulled out. The host egg is now infected. Stage 8 involves feeding on the fluid that spills out from the hole the ovipositor made. When this is done, stage 9 begins and it will find a place to rest for a while. Stage 10 involves grooming themselves thoroughly.

The amount of eggs laid in a host egg varies but is usually one or two. It lays one egg 68% of the time, 2 eggs 31% of the time, and 3 eggs 1% of the time.

The entire process from egg to adult happens on the inside of the host egg, which takes just under 26 days.

List of primary hosts
- Order: Hemiptera (True bugs)
- Family: Alydidae (Broad-headed bugs)
- Riptortus clavatus Thunberg, 1783
- Family: Pentatomidae (Stink bugs)
- Nezara viridula Linnaeus 1758
- Palomena prasina Linnaeus, 1761
- Tessaratoma papillosa Drury, 1770
- Order: Lepidoptera (Butterflies)
- Family: Erebidae
- Lymantria dispar Linnaeus, 1758
- Lymantria obfuscata Walker, 1865
- Nygmia phaeorrhoea Donovan, 1813
- Family: Lasiocampidae (snout moths)
- Dendrolimus sibiricus Butler, 1877
- Dendrolimus spectabilis Butler, 1877
- Malacosoma neustria Linnaeus, 1758
- Family: Notodontidae (Prominents)
- Cerura vinula Linnaeus, 1758
- Family: Papilionidae (Swallowtail butterflies)
- Iphiclides podalirius Linnaeus, 1758
- Family: Saturniidae
- Antheraea pernyi Guérin-Méneville, 1855
- Caligula japonica Moore, 1872
- Samia cynthia Drury, 1773

== Pest control ==
Anastatus japonicus parasitizes the eggs of agricultural and forestry pests, which makes it an important part of natural pest control and a more sustainable alternative to conventional pesticides. This advantage has captured the interest of scientists who wanted to find a way to mass-produce A. japonicus. To mass-produce it, they needed a suitable host that is easy to transport, low cost, and easy to store. These criteria are fulfilled by the Chinese oak tussar moth (Antheraea pernyi), which was the chosen species for their research and the one they chose as the best candidate.
