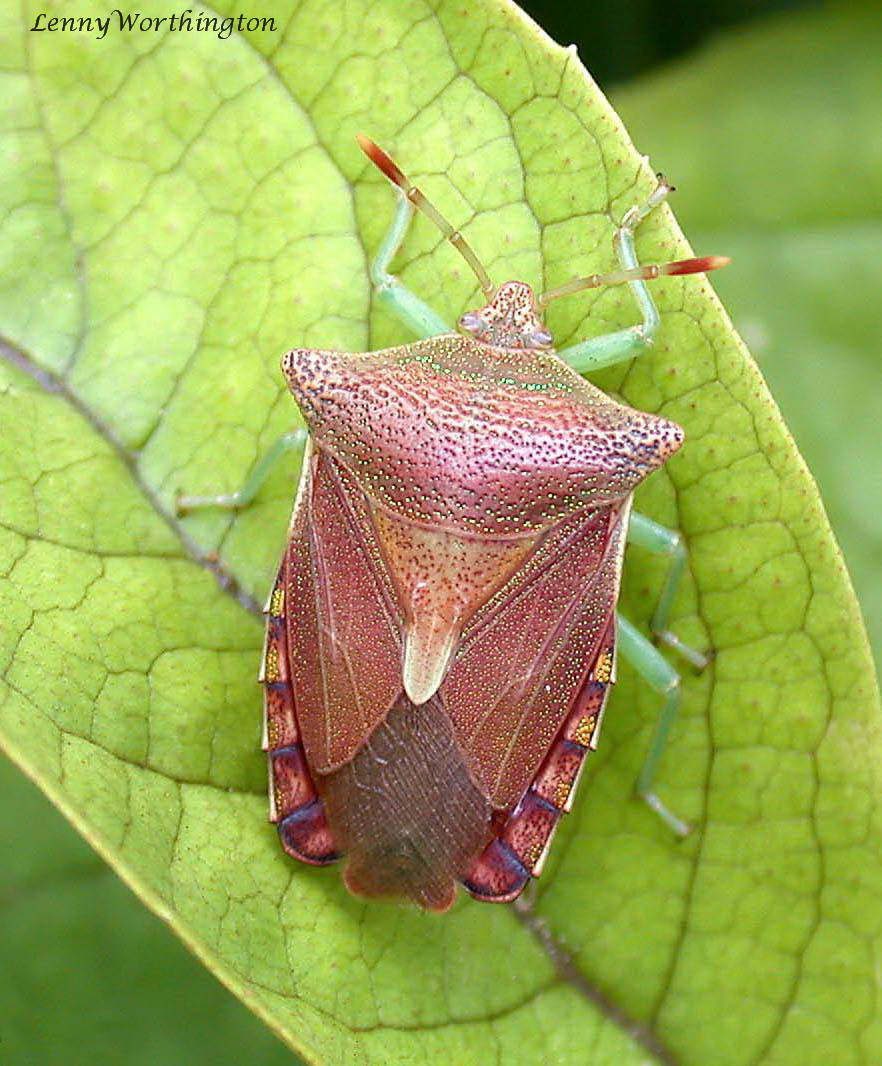
- Pygoplatys auropunctatus

Scientific classification
- Domain: Eukaryota
- Kingdom: Animalia
- Phylum: Arthropoda
- Class: Insecta
- Order: Hemiptera
- Suborder: Heteroptera
- Family: Tessaratomidae
- Subfamily: Tessaratominae
- Tribe: Tessaratomini
- Genus: Pygoplatys; Dallas, 1851

= Pygoplatys =

Genus of true bugs

Pygoplatys is a genus of Asian shield bugs in the family Tessaratomidae and tribe Tessaratomini, erected by William Dallas in 1851. Species have been recorded from Indochina and Malesia.

== Species ==
The Global Biodiversity Information Facility lists:

1. Pygoplatys acutus Dallas, 1851
2. Pygoplatys auropunctatus Blöte, 1945
3. Pygoplatys berendi Magnien, 2011
4. Pygoplatys bovillus Stål, 1871
5. Pygoplatys celebensis Breddin, 1901
6. Pygoplatys firmatus (Walker, 1868)
7. Pygoplatys forticornis (Walker, 1868)
8. Pygoplatys haedulus Stål, 1871
9. Pygoplatys ingenuus (Walker, 1868)
10. Pygoplatys jordii Magnien, 2011
11. Pygoplatys kerzhneri Magnien, 2008
12. Pygoplatys lancifer Walker, 1868
13. Pygoplatys longiceps Stål, 1871
14. Pygoplatys lunatus Distant, 1893
15. Pygoplatys merinjakensis Distant, 1914
16. Pygoplatys minax Vollenhoven, 1868
17. Pygoplatys montanus Distant, 1900
18. Pygoplatys obtusus Blöte, 1945
19. Pygoplatys pluotae Magnien, 2008
20. Pygoplatys raingeardi Magnien, 2012
21. Pygoplatys ralandii (Ellenrieder, 1862)
22. Pygoplatys rideri Magnien, 2008
23. Pygoplatys rosulentus Stål, 1871
24. Pygoplatys shelfordi Distant, 1901
25. Pygoplatys streitoi Magnien, 2017
26. Pygoplatys subrugosus Vollenhoven, 1868
27. Pygoplatys tauriformis (Distant, 1893)
28. Pygoplatys tenangau Magnien, Smets, Pluot-Sigwalt & Constant, 2008
29. Pygoplatys thoreyi Dohrn, 1863
30. Pygoplatys validus Dallas, 1851
31. Pygoplatys zonatus Stål, 1863
