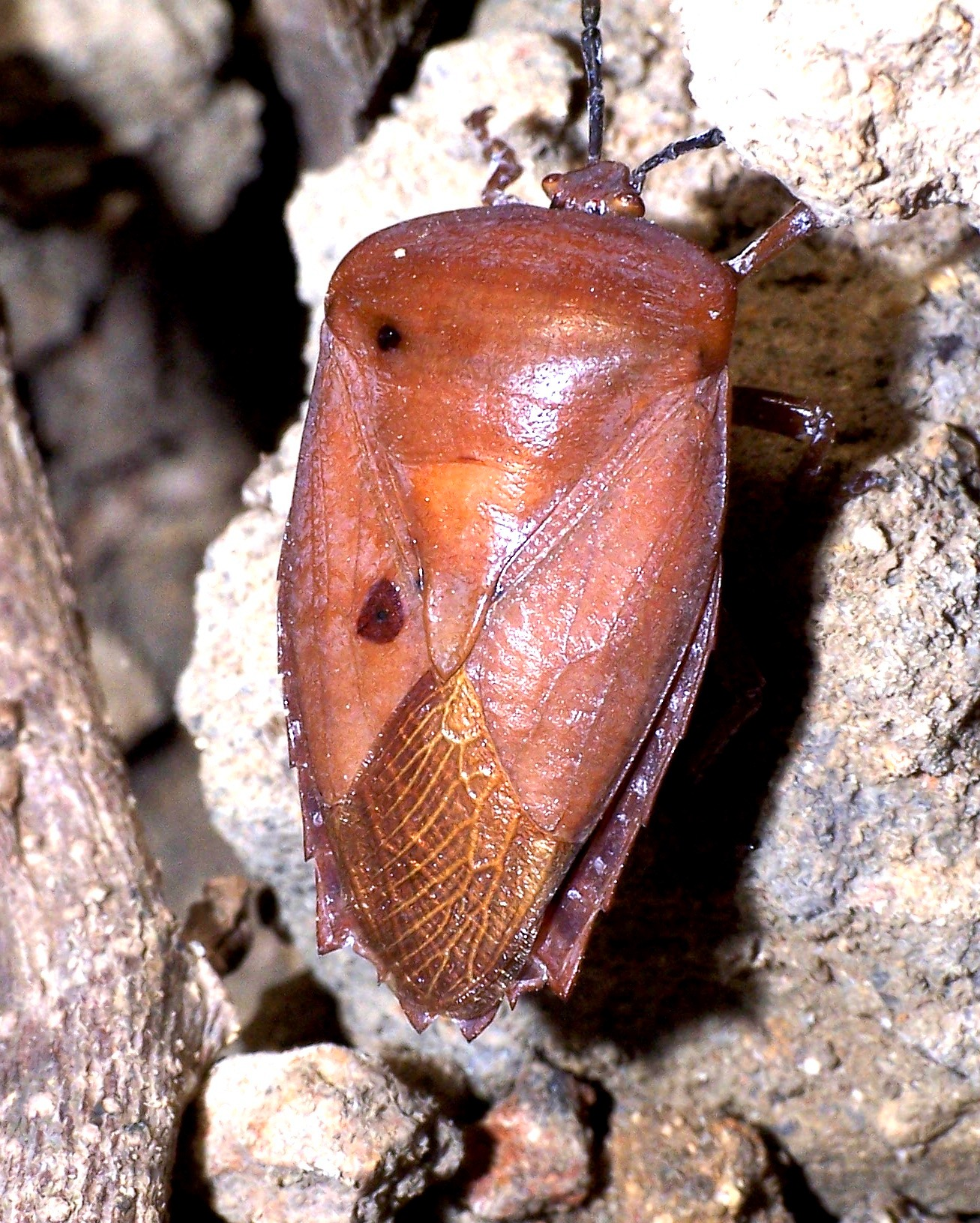
- Tessaratoma papillosa

Scientific classification
- Domain: Eukaryota
- Kingdom: Animalia
- Phylum: Arthropoda
- Class: Insecta
- Order: Hemiptera
- Suborder: Heteroptera
- Family: Tessaratomidae
- Subfamily: Tessaratominae
- Tribe: Tessaratomini
- Genus: Tessaratoma; Berthold, 1827

= Tessaratoma =

Genus of true bugs

Tessaratoma is the type genus of the shield bug family Tessaratomidae, tribe Tessaratomini and subtribe Tessaratomina. Species have been recorded from the Indomalayan realm and Australasia. Several species appear to be frugivores and T. papillosa is a significant pest of lychees.

== Species ==
The Global Biodiversity Information Facility lists:

1. Tessaratoma absimilis Distant, 1893
2. Tessaratoma aethiops Distant, 1877
3. Tessaratoma afzelii Stål, 1854
4. Tessaratoma conspersa Stål, 1863
5. Tessaratoma furcifera Walker, 1868
6. Tessaratoma hornimani Distant, 1877
7. Tessaratoma indica Breddin, 1909
8. Tessaratoma indicta Distant, 1890
9. Tessaratoma javanica (Thunberg, 1783)
10. Tessaratoma kina Distant, 1909
11. Tessaratoma kinta Distant, 1909
12. Tessaratoma longicornis Dohrn, 1863
13. Tessaratoma malaya Stål, 1870
14. Tessaratoma miscella Montandon, 1894
15. Tessaratoma nemorivaga Distant, 1890
16. Tessaratoma nigripes Dallas, 1851
17. Tessaratoma nigroscutellata Distant, 1921
18. Tessaratoma oblonga Blöte, 1945
19. Tessaratoma papillosa (Drury, 1770)
20. Tessaratoma planicarinata Breddin, 1912
21. Tessaratoma quadrata Distant, 1902
22. Tessaratoma rubida Breddin, 1901
23. Tessaratoma spinipes Bergroth, 1906
24. Tessaratoma stictica Vollenhoven, 1868
25. Tessaratoma striata Walker, 1868
26. Tessaratoma timorensis Vollenhoven, 1868
