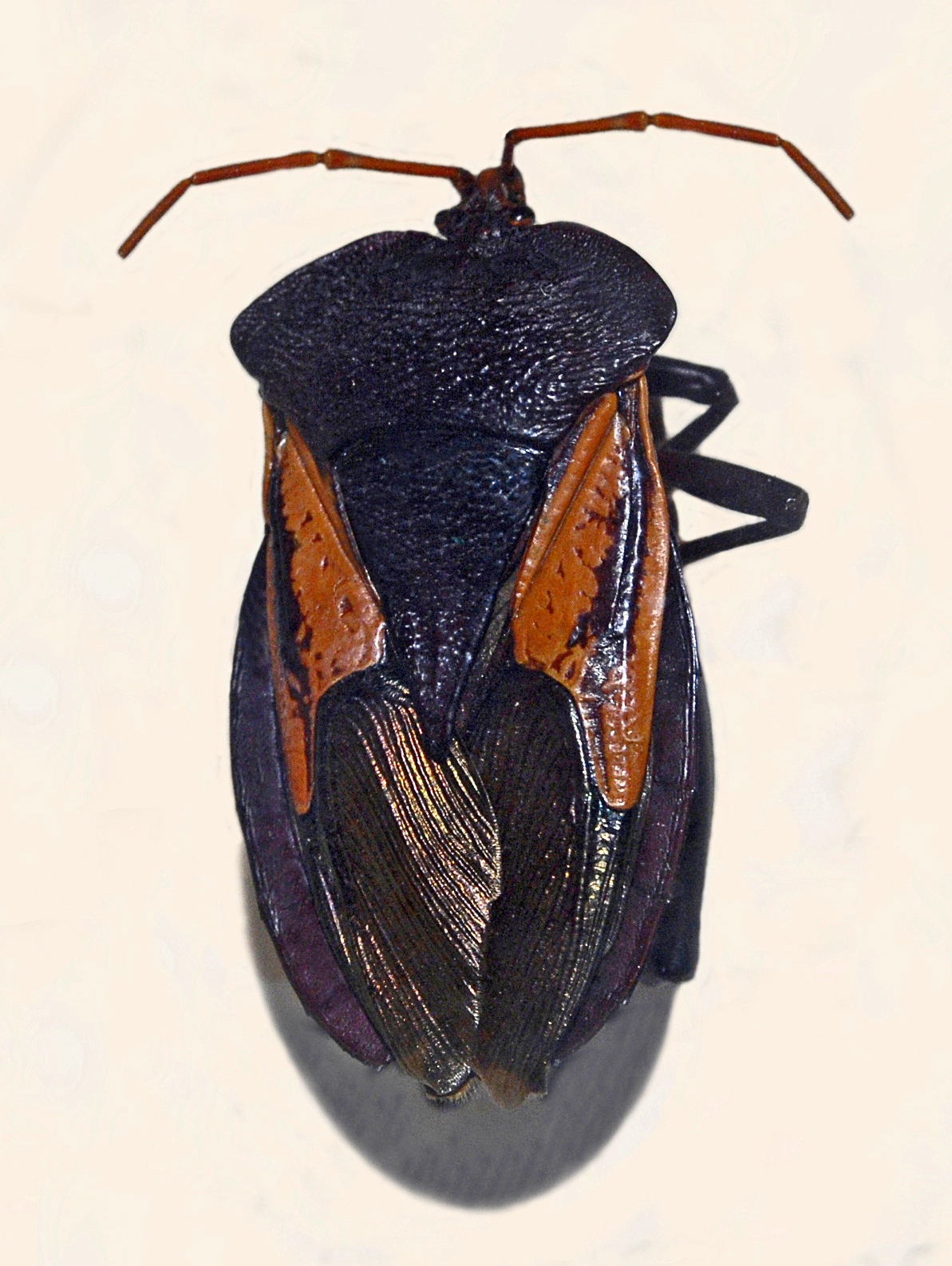
- Oncomeris flavicornis

Scientific classification
- Domain: Eukaryota
- Kingdom: Animalia
- Phylum: Arthropoda
- Class: Insecta
- Order: Hemiptera
- Suborder: Heteroptera
- Family: Tessaratomidae
- Subfamily: Oncomerinae
- Genus: Oncomeris; Laporte, 1833

= Oncomeris =

Genus of true bugs

Oncomeris is a genus of true bugs belonging to the family Tessaratomidae.

== Species ==
- Oncomeris bernsteini Vollenhoven 1872
- Oncomeris flavicornis (Guérin-Méneville, 1831)
- Oncomeris ostraciopterus (Montrouzier, 1855)
- Oncomeris robustus (Lep. & Serv.)

== Distribution ==
These bugs are present in Australia, Lesser Sunda Islands, Moluccas, New Guinea and Sulawesi.
