= Stilida =

Scientific classification
- Kingdom: Animalia
- Phylum: Arthropoda
- Clade: Pancrustacea
- Class: Insecta
- Order: Hemiptera
- Suborder: Heteroptera
- Infraorder: Pentatomomorpha
- Superfamily: Pentatomoidea
- Family: Tessaratomidae
- Subfamily: Oncomerinae
- Genus: Stilida; Stål, 1864

Genus of true bugs

Stilida is a genus of true bugs in the family Tessaratomidae, and endemic to Australia.
