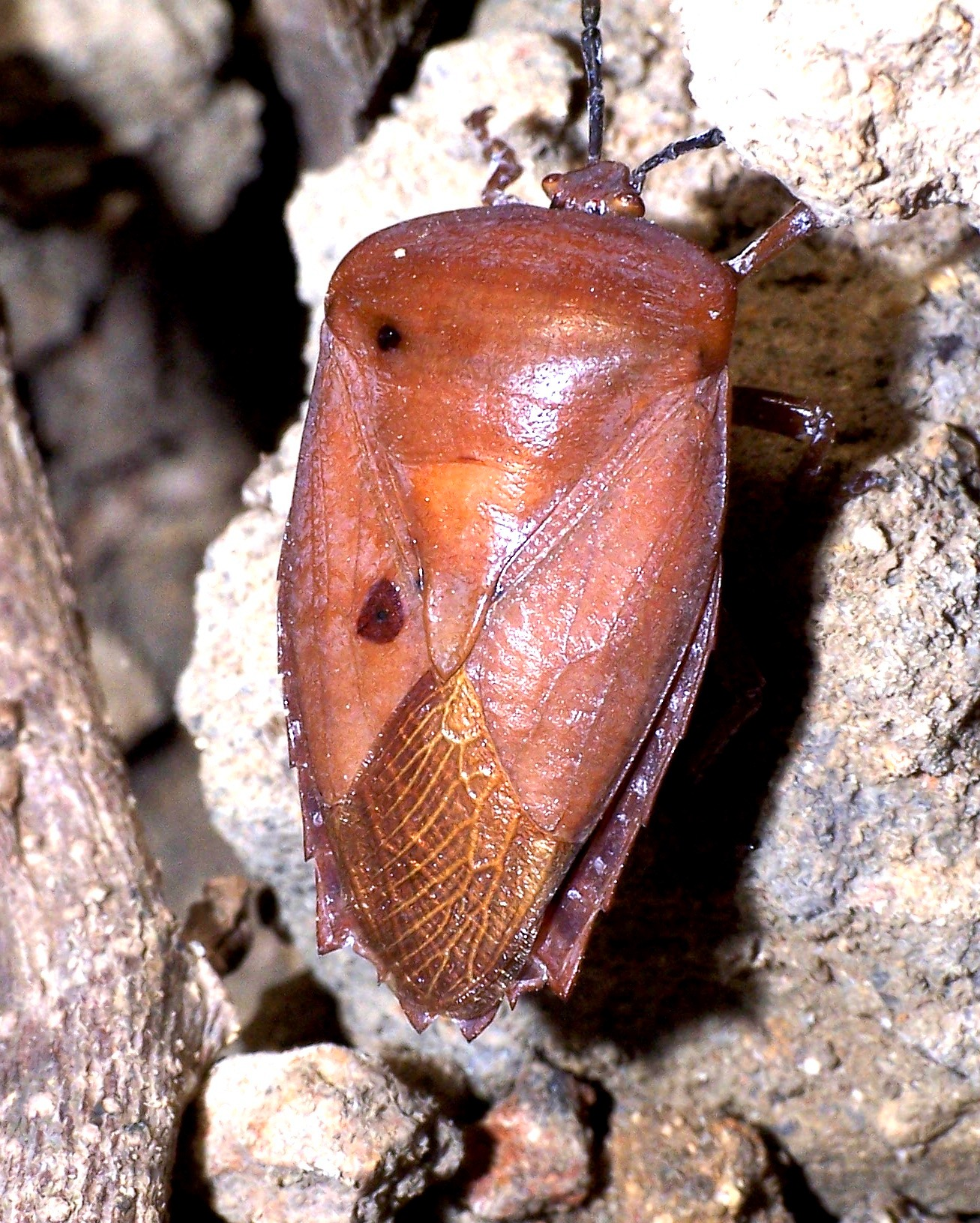

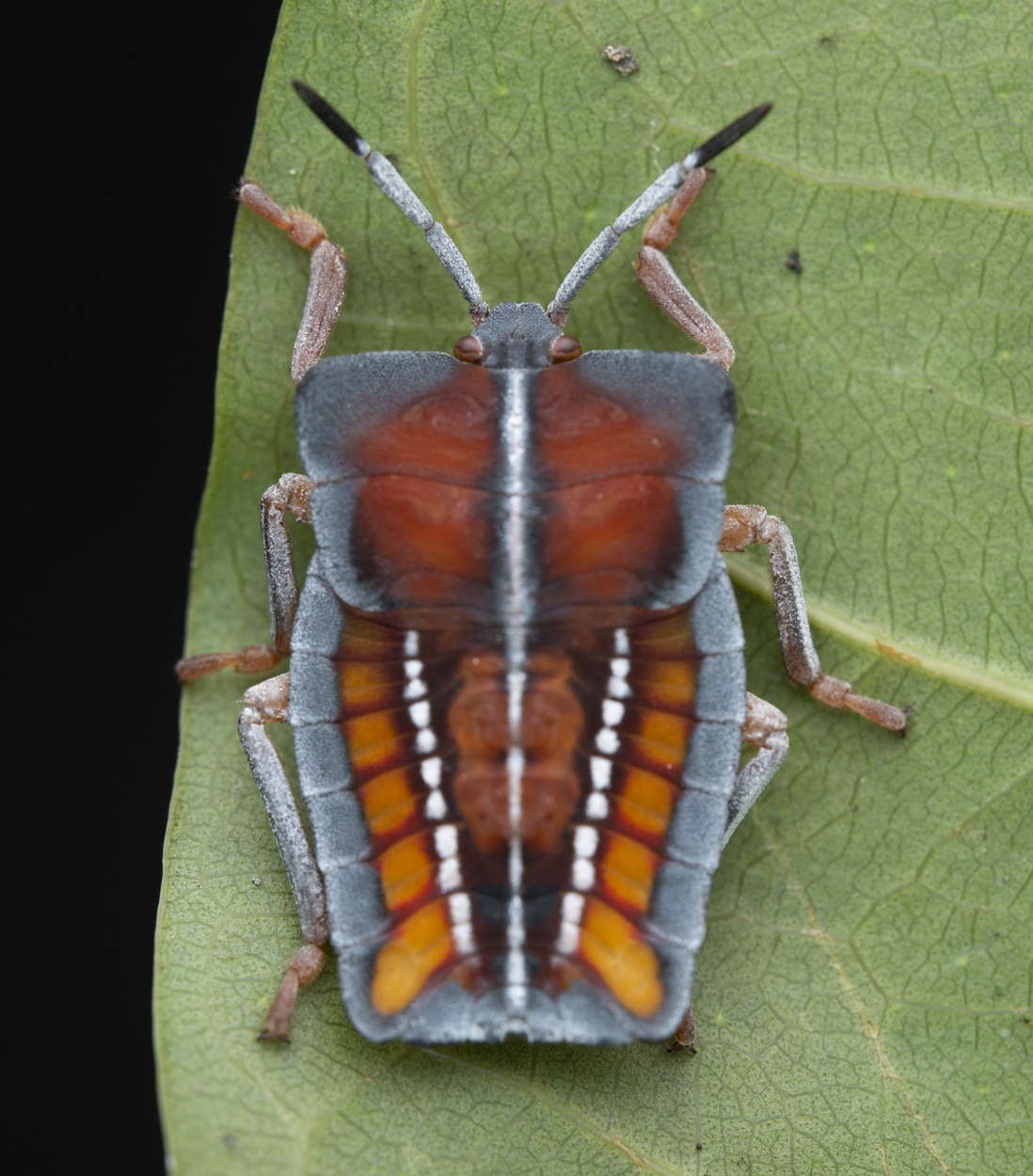
- Adult (top), nymph (bottom)

Scientific classification
- Domain: Eukaryota
- Kingdom: Animalia
- Phylum: Arthropoda
- Class: Insecta
- Order: Hemiptera
- Suborder: Heteroptera
- Family: Tessaratomidae
- Genus: Tessaratoma
- Species: T. papillosa

Binomial name
- Tessaratoma papillosa (Drury, 1770)

= Tessaratoma papillosa =

Species of true bug

Tessaratoma papillosa, the lychee giant stink bug, is a species of bug in the family Tessaratomidae. It is found in Indomalaya, Australasia, and Eastern Asia.

It feeds on the buds, shoots, flower sprigs, and fruits of lychee and longan trees using its piercing and sucking mouthparts. This feeding can cause major damage to the tree, causing its fruits and flowers to drop off and the withering of twigs and fruits. A tree that is fed upon by many T. papillosa may experienced retarded growth or even death. For this reason, T. papillosa is considered an agricultural pest, causing considerable economic losses for farmers in affected regions.

== Description ==
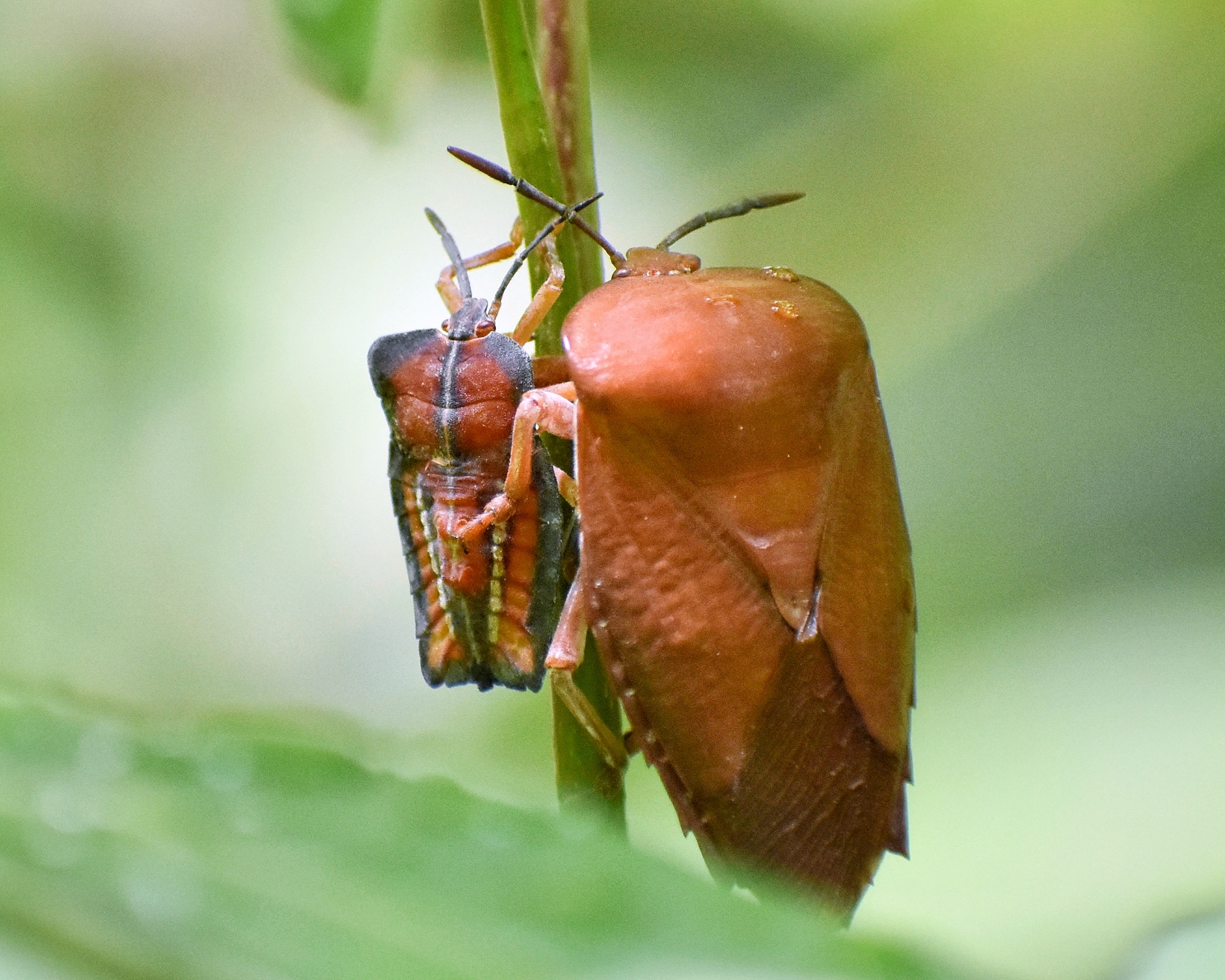
Nymph with adult

Adult Tessaratoma papillosa have a shield-shaped body with yellowish-brown coloration. They have a body length of 24-28mm and a width of 15-17mm. Females are slightly larger than males. They have one pair of ommatidium and one pair of compound eyes, both of which are red. The antennae have four segments and are dark brown. The prothorax is tilted forward and downward. It has odor glands near the front of the metathoracic side plate and white wax powder covering the ventral surface of the thorax. The female has a longitudinal slit in the center of its ventral surface on the final segment of its abdomen, while the male's abdomen has a concave mating structure.

Nymphs have five instars. The first instar has a body length of about 4-5mm and an oval-shaped body. Newborns are bright red, but gradually fade to blue-gray, with dark red compound eyes. The second instar has a slightly rectangular shape and is about 8mm long. Its body is orange, with an outer edge of grey-blue and white dorsal midline and vertical stripes on its abdomen. The third and fourth instars have a similar coloration as the second, with body lengths of 10-12mm and 14-16mm respectively. The fifth instar develops prominent wing buds and are about 18-20mm in length.

T. papillosa eggs are pale green when laid, fading to gray with time. They are laid in clusters of about 14 eggs and are slightly oval and about 2.5-2.6mm long.

== Gallery ==
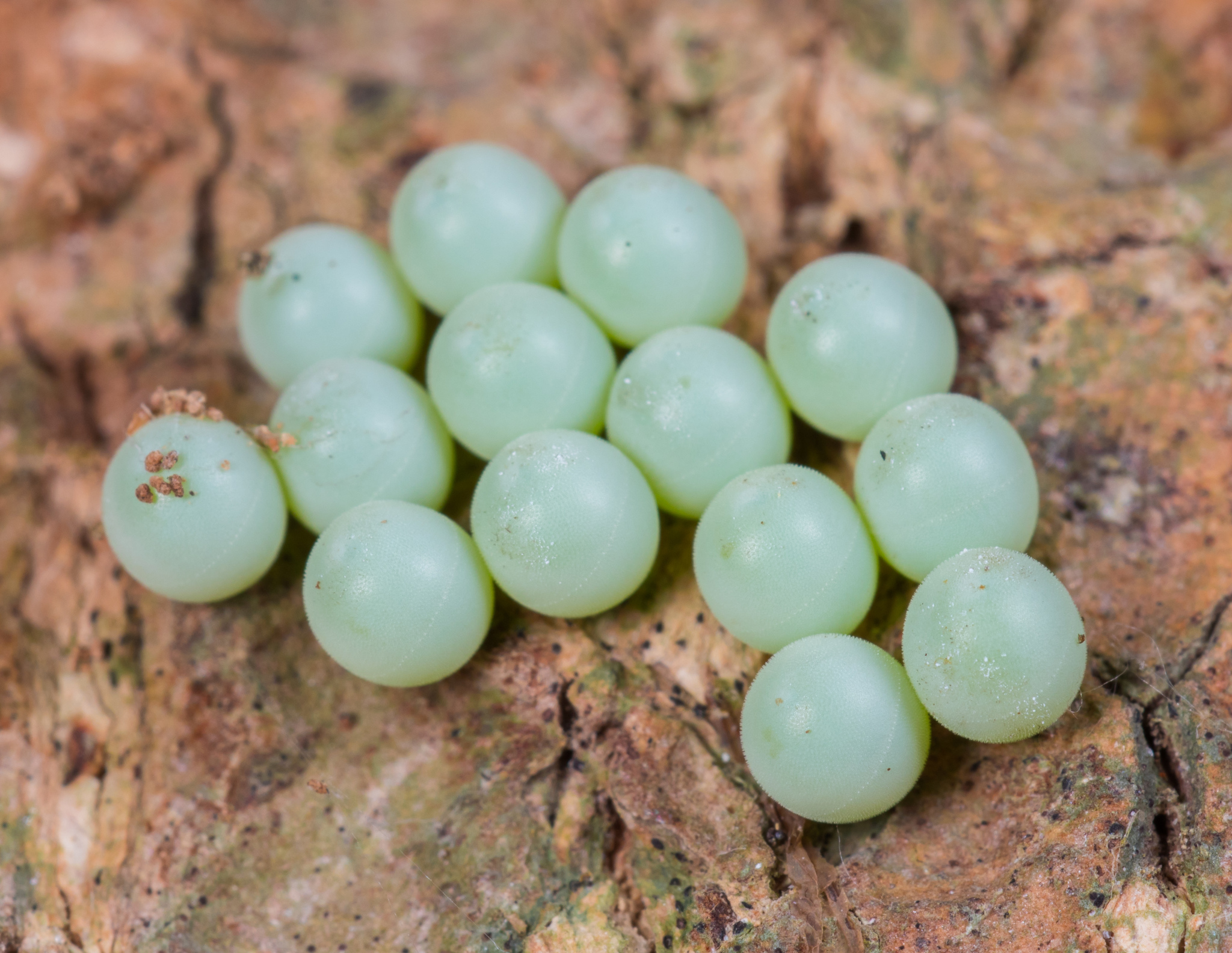
Eggs

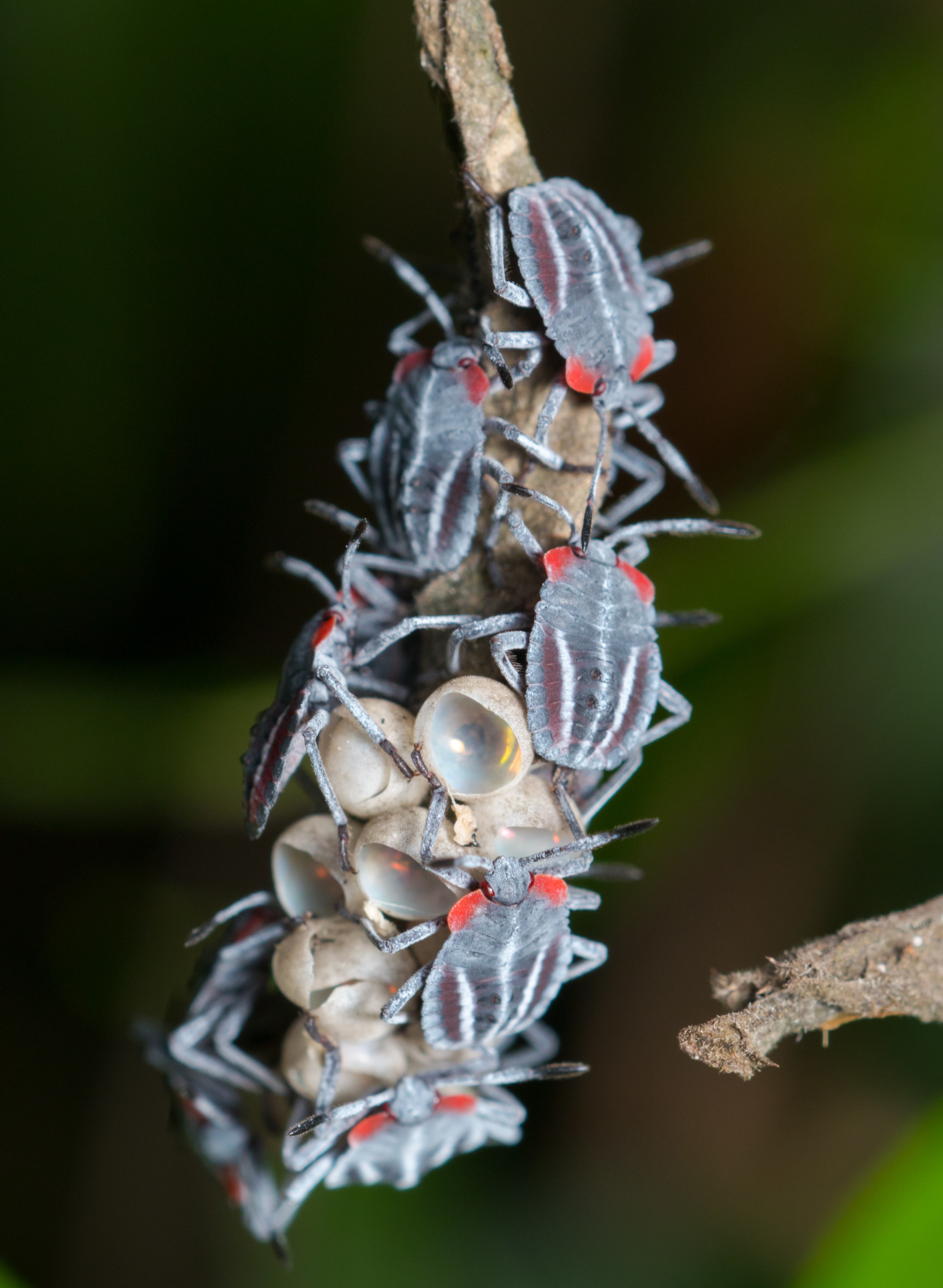
Newly hatched 1st instar nymphs

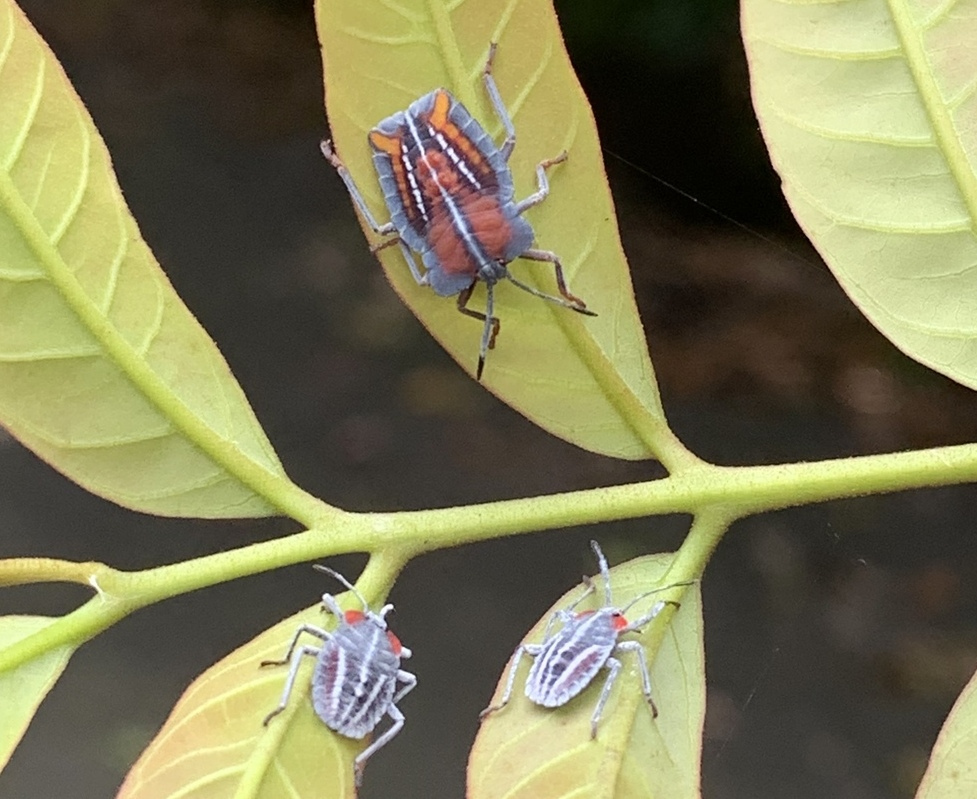
1st instar and older nymph

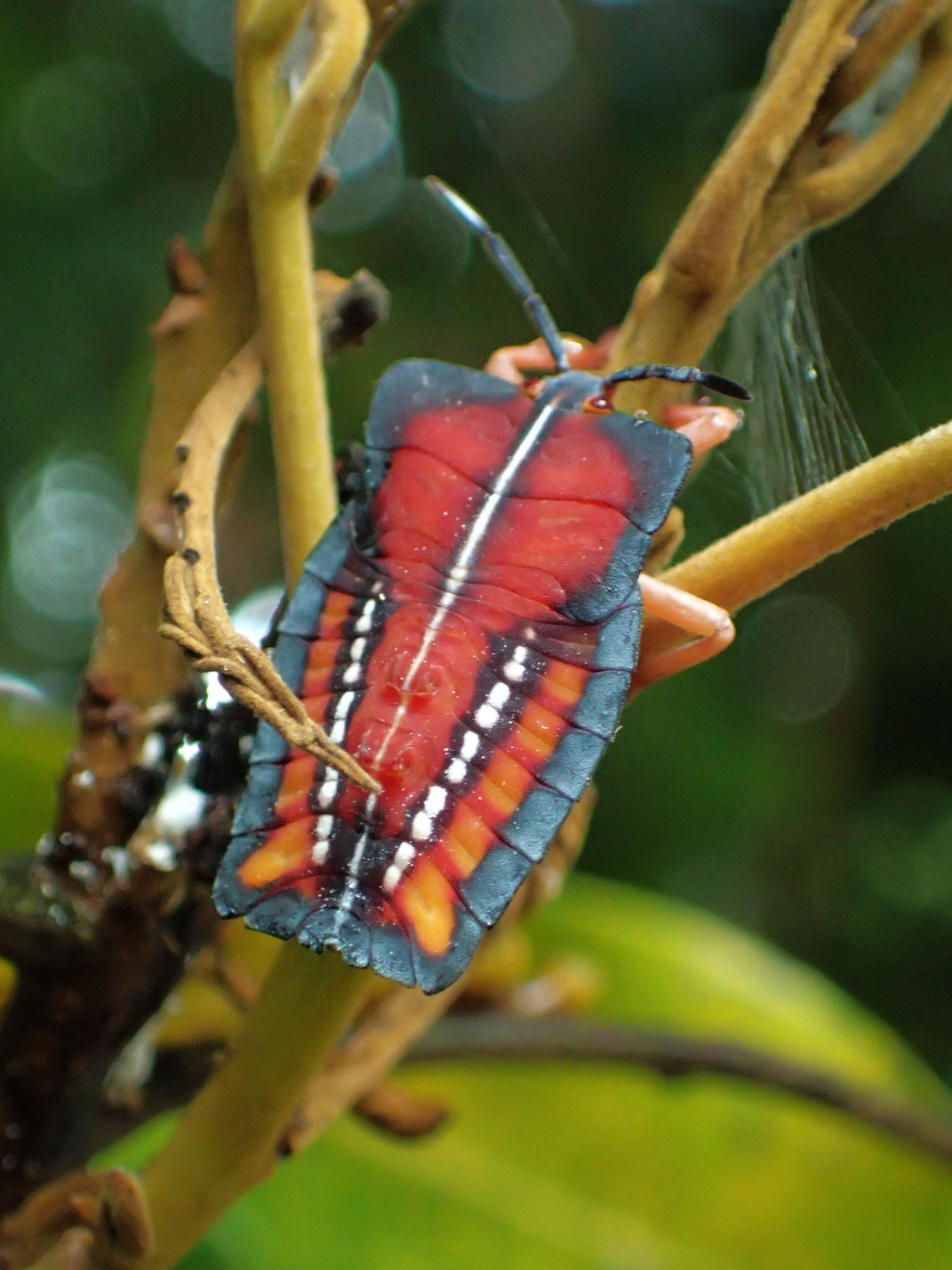
Older nymph

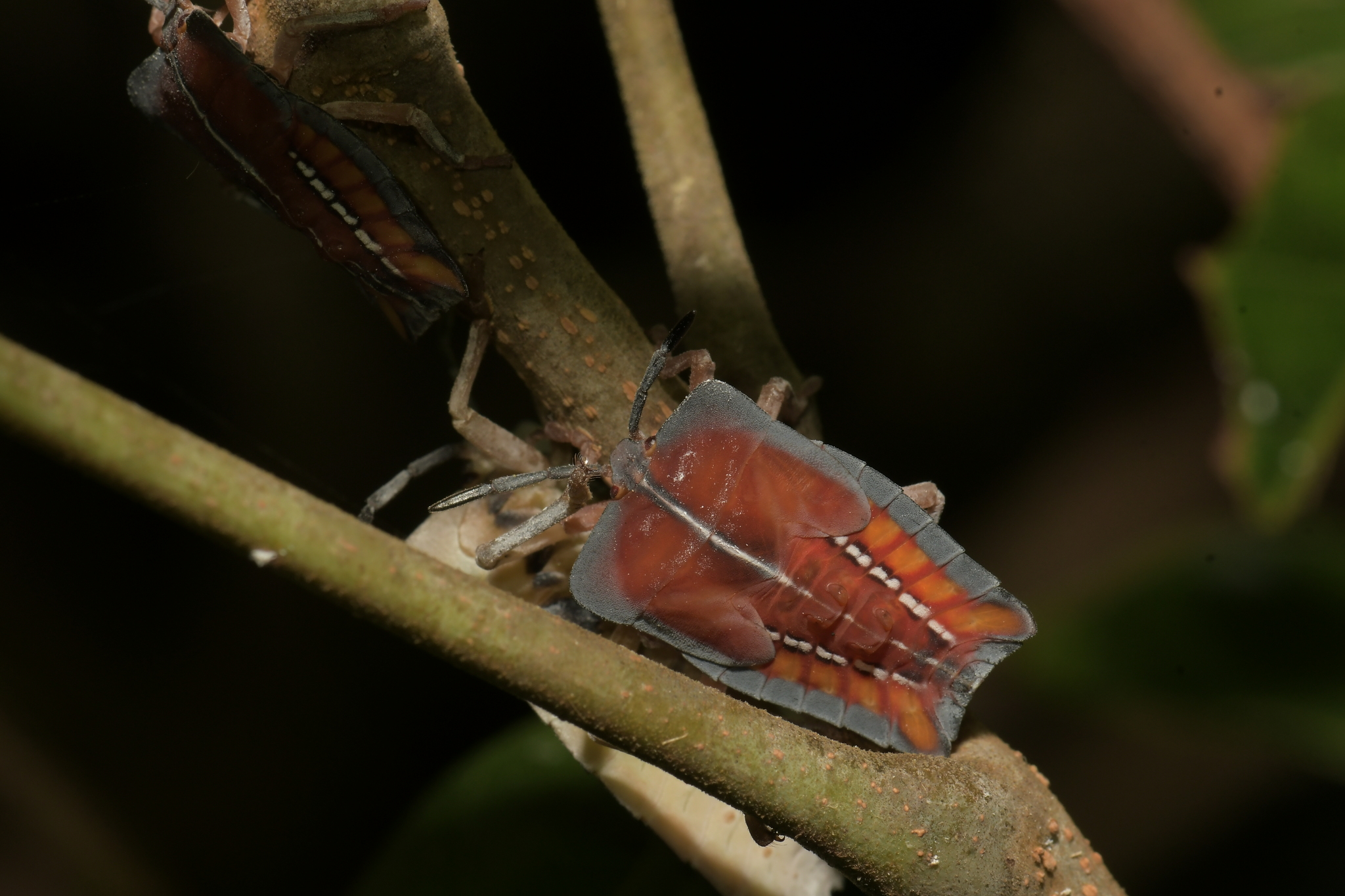
Wing buds form

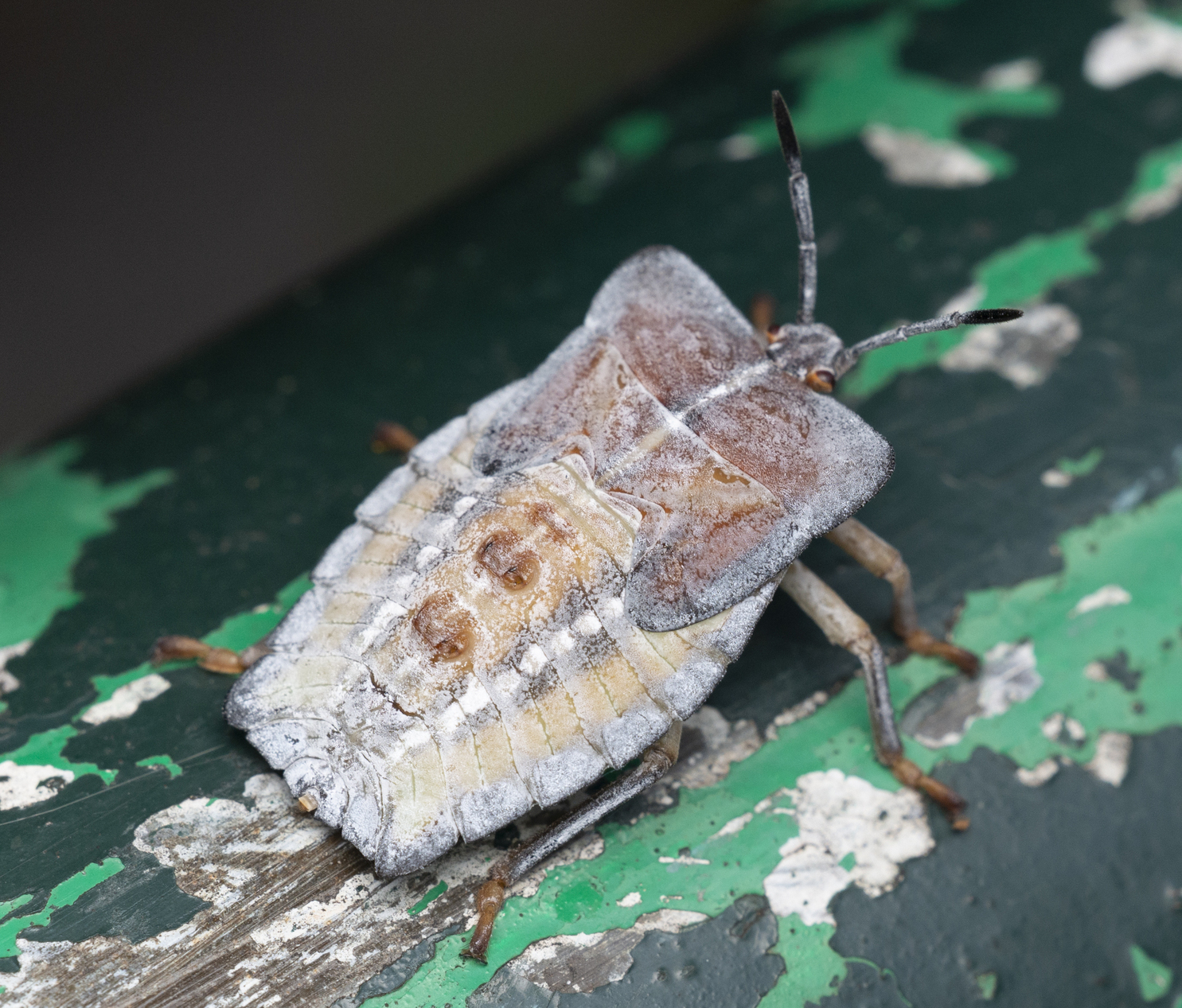
5th instar slowly becomes grayish from waxy secretions

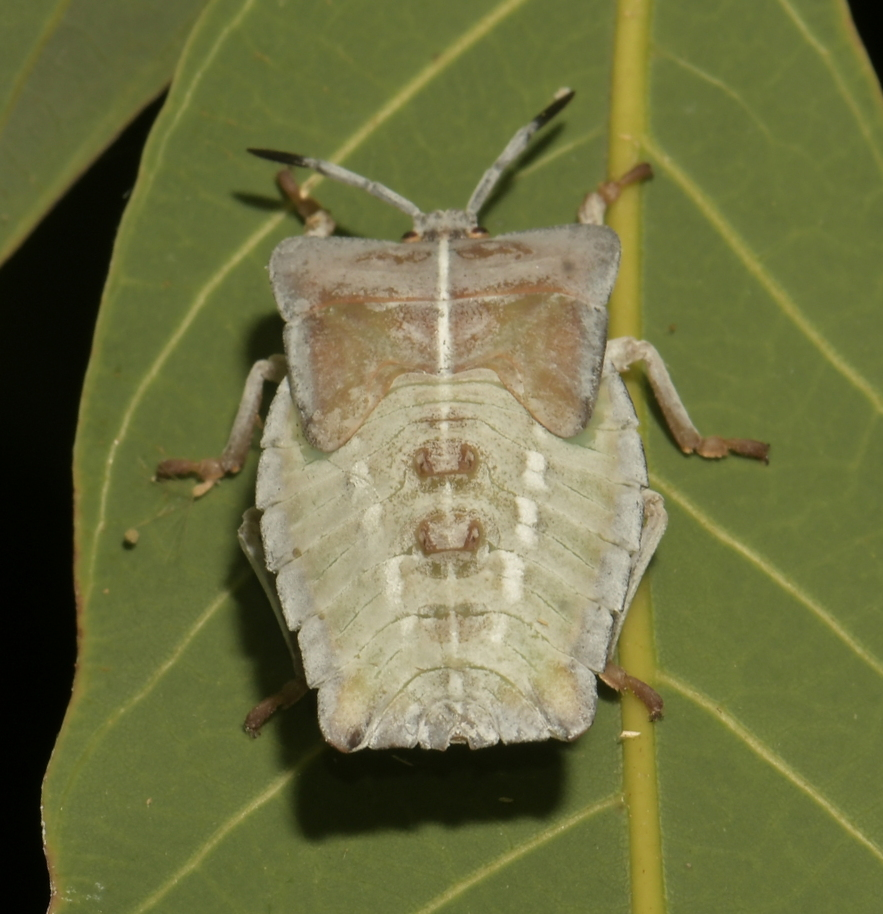
5th instar

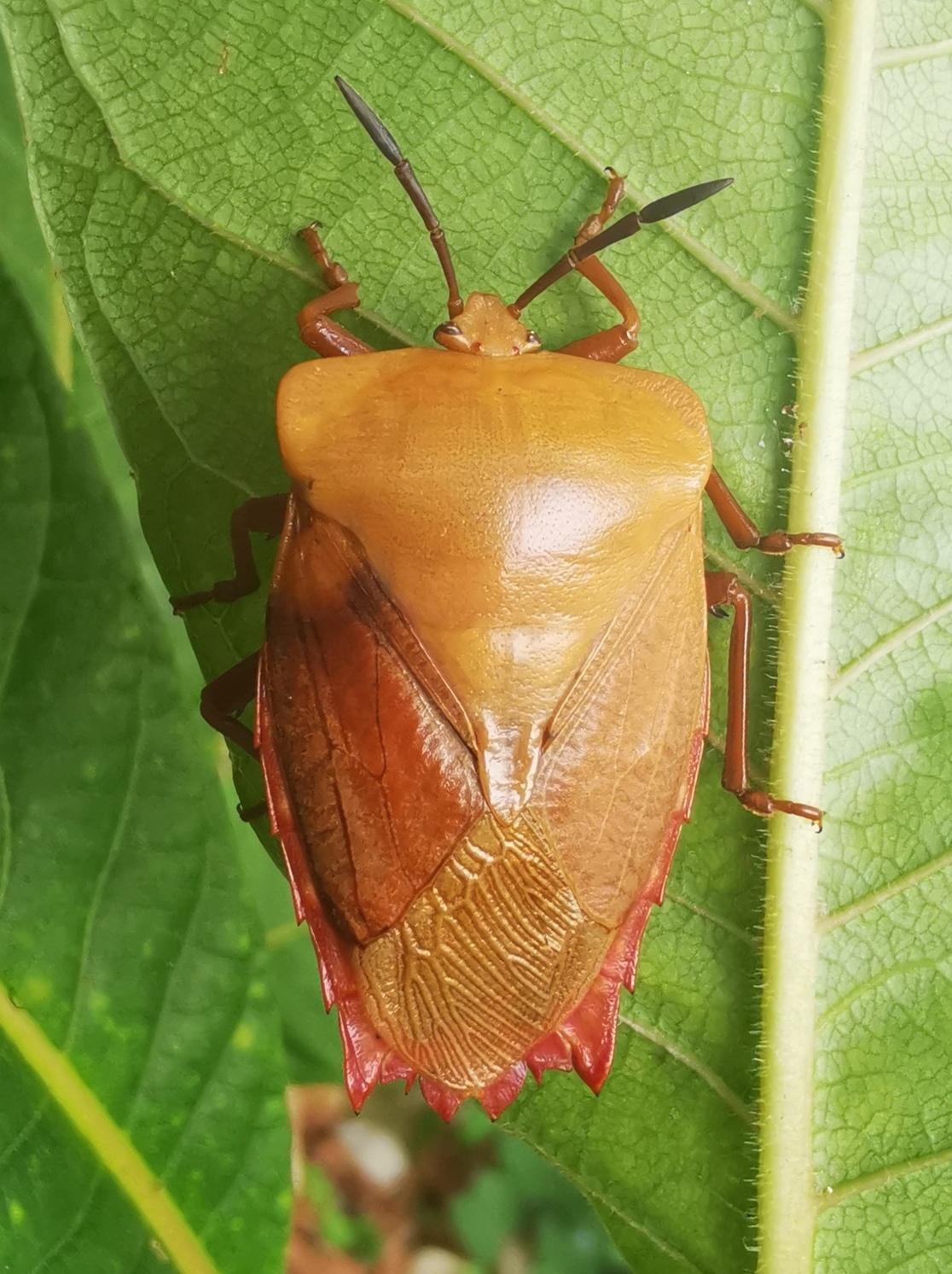
Adult

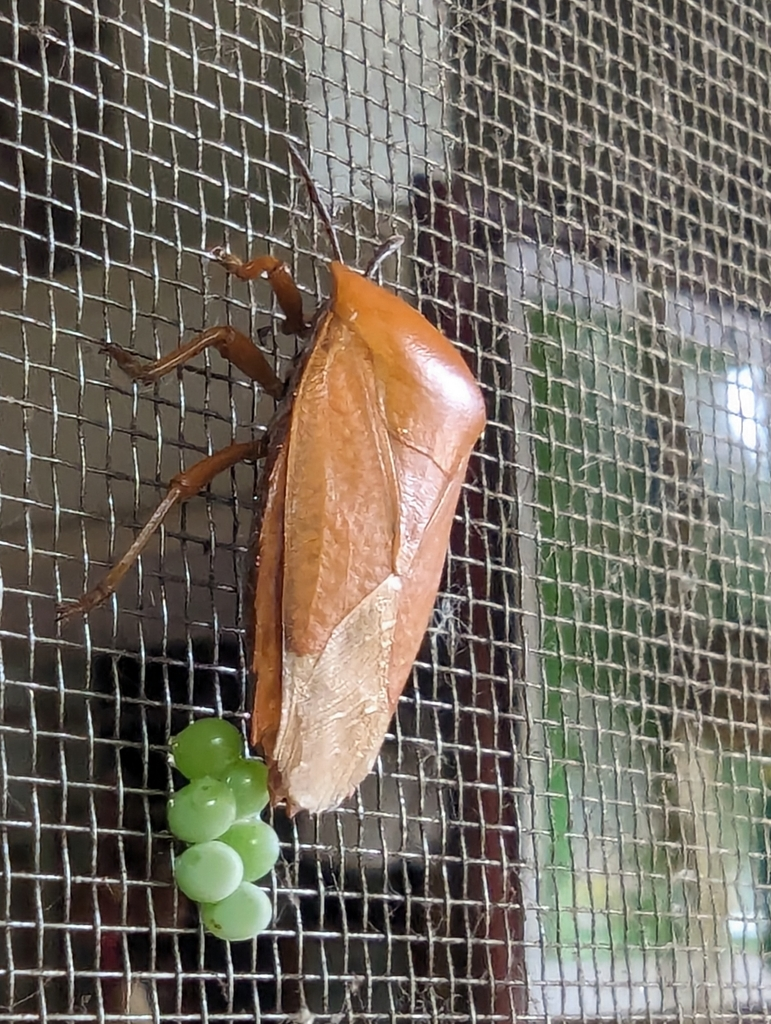
Adult female laying eggs
