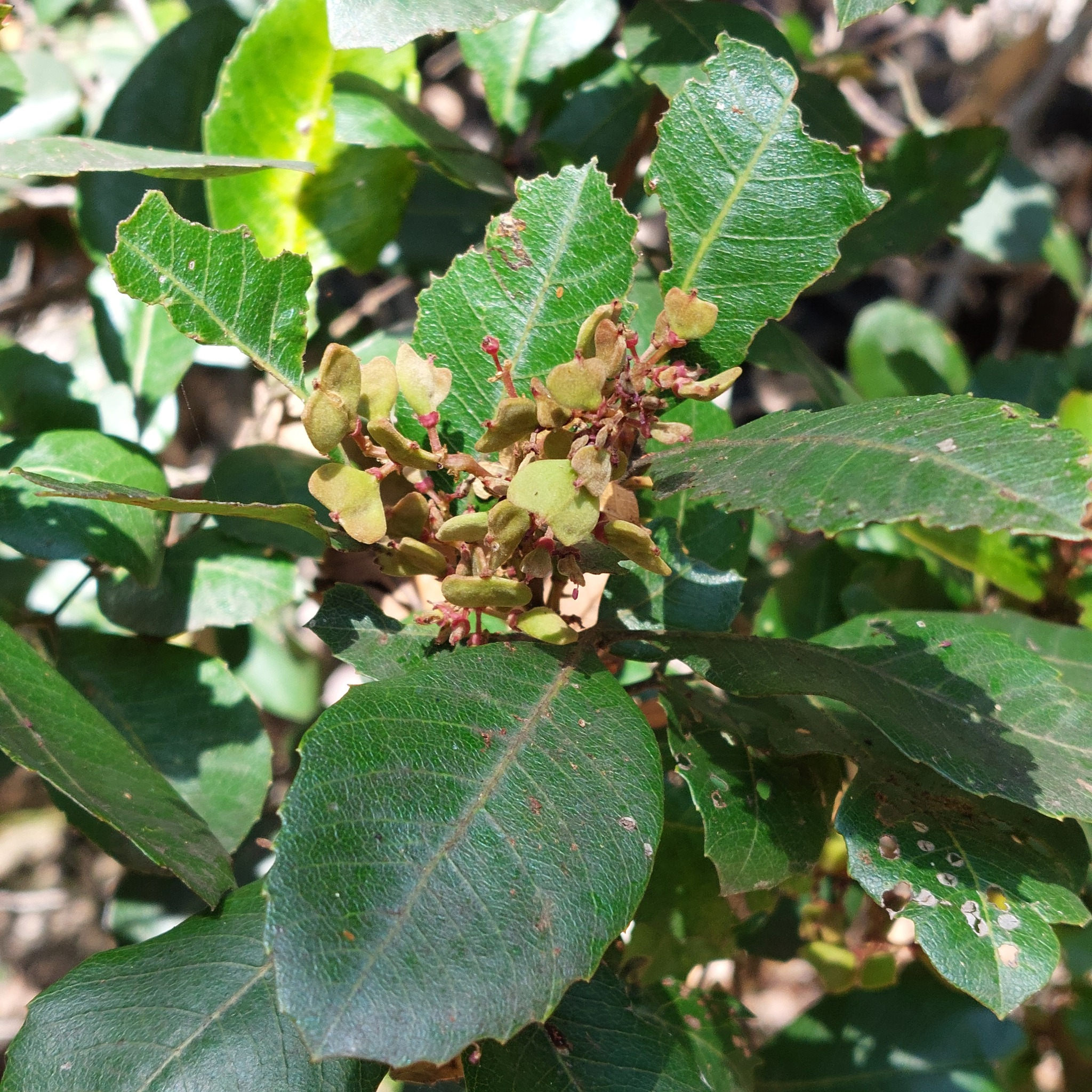
- (Kwiambal National Park)
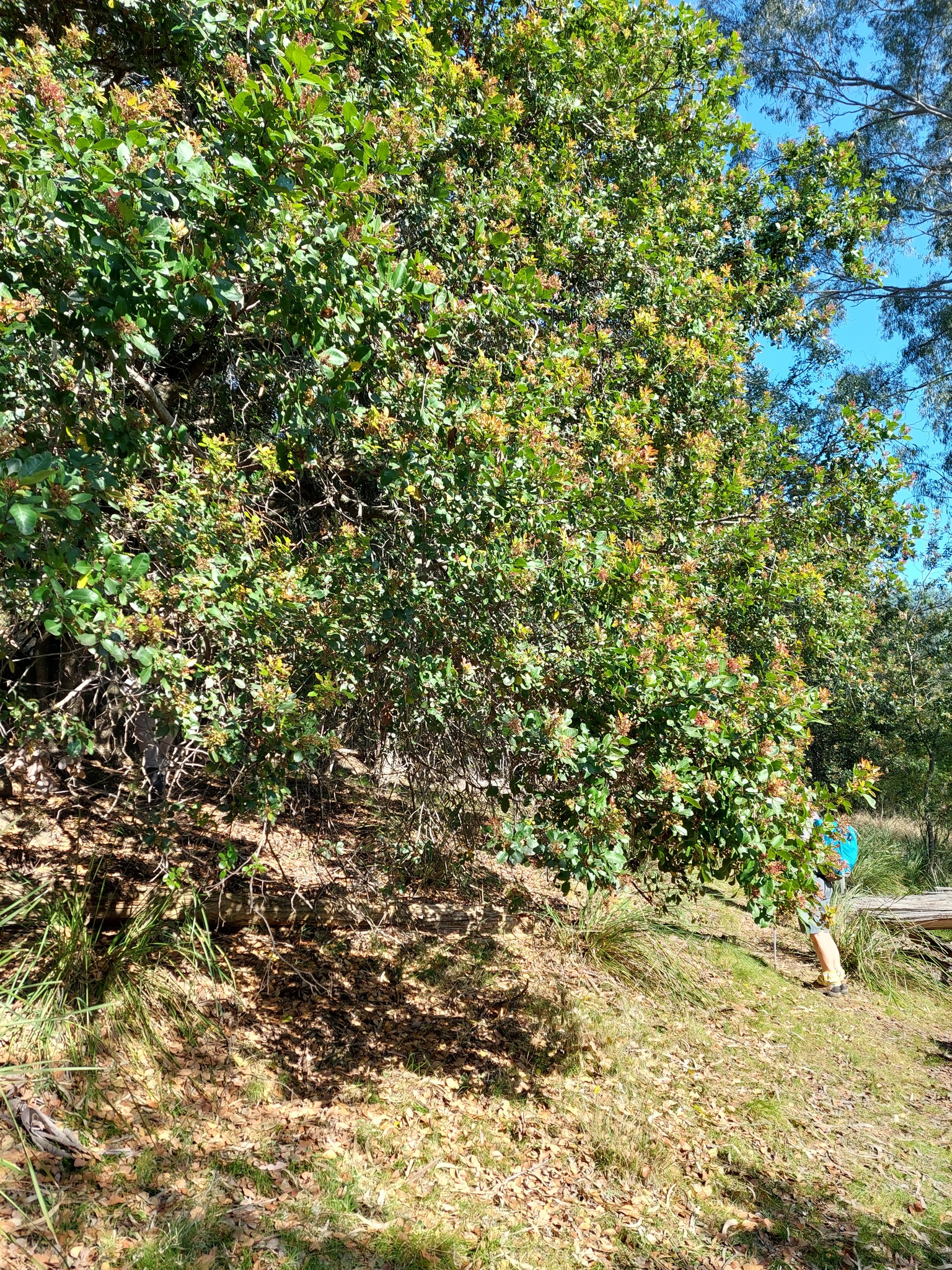
- (Kwiambal National Park)

Scientific classification
- Kingdom: Plantae
- Clade: Tracheophytes
- Clade: Angiosperms
- Clade: Eudicots
- Clade: Rosids
- Order: Sapindales
- Family: Sapindaceae
- Genus: Alectryon
- Species: A. subdentatus

Binomial name
- Alectryon subdentatus (F.Muell. ex Benth.) Radlk.

Synonyms
- Alectryon subdentatus f. genuinus Radlk. Nephelium subdentatum F.Muell. ex Benth. Alectryon subdentatus f. pseudostipularis Radlk.

= Alectryon subdentatus =

Species of small tree

Alectryon subdentatus is a tall shrub/small tree in the Sapindaceae family, and was first described in 1863 as Nephelium subdentatum by Ferdinand von Mueller, and then in 1879 was assigned to the genus, Alectryon, by Ludwig Radlkofer.

It is native to Queensland and to New South Wales in Australia, where it is found in the dry tropical biome.

== Description ==
It grows as a shrub or small tree (to a height of 11 m). Its bark is grey to brown which, smooth at first, becomes rough and scaly. Its younger branches and stems have a covering of pale yellow hairs, but older stems are sparsely hairy. Additionally, young stems have longitudinal grooves. The leaves are alternate and compound with four to six opposing leaflets, and the lowest pair is much smaller than the others. The margins are serrate to dentate and have 8-12 lateral veins. The leaves' upper surface is glossy while the lower surface is hairy and paler. The fruit is usually a 2-lobed capsule with black seeds, one per lobe, having a red fleshy aril which covers almost half the seed.

It differs from Alectryon tomentosus in its fruits.
