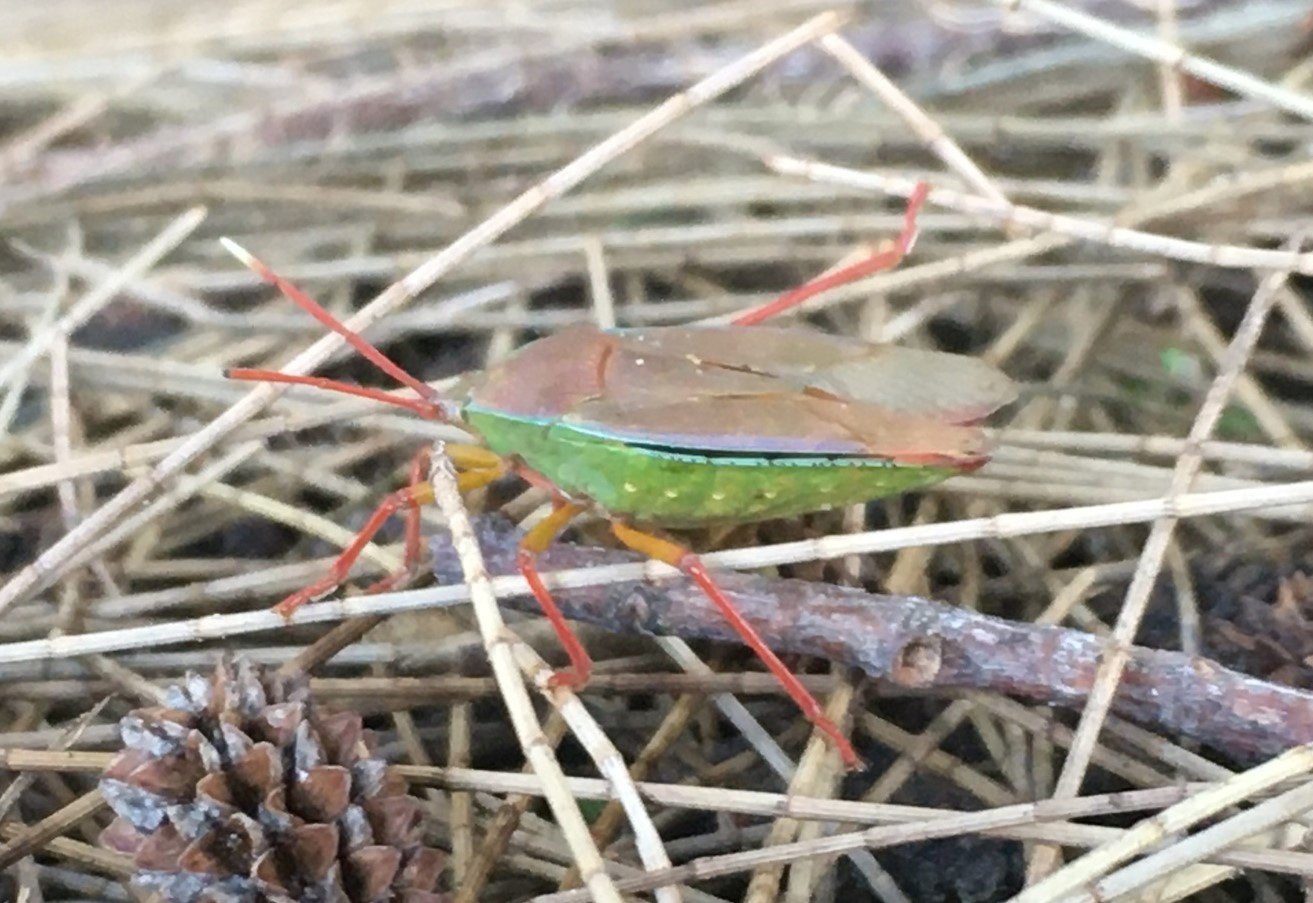

Scientific classification
- Domain: Eukaryota
- Kingdom: Animalia
- Phylum: Arthropoda
- Class: Insecta
- Order: Hemiptera
- Suborder: Heteroptera
- Family: Tessaratomidae
- Genus: Lyramorpha
- Species: L. rosea

Binomial name
- Lyramorpha rosea Westwood, 1837

= Lyramorpha rosea =

Species of stink bug

Lyramorpha rosea, commonly known as the lychee stink bug, is a species of stink bug in the family Tessaratomidae. It is found in eastern Australia.

== Description ==
According to the original species description by Westwood, L. rosea has legs and antennae pink (rosea in the original Latin), the margins of the thorax and hemelytra are bronze, and the underside of the body is greenish-yellow.

The body length, also according to the original description, is 11 lines. In entomology, a line is equal to one-twelfth of an inch, so this is equivalent to a length of ~0.917 inches or ~2.328 centimetres.

== Diet ==
Lyramorpha rosea feeds on plants in the family Sapindaceae. Its native host plants are in the genera Alectryon, Atalaya, Cupaniopsis and Guioa. It also feeds on the exotic lychee (Litchi chinensis). There are records of it on plants in other families, but these require confirmation.

== Behaviour ==
Females brood their eggs, in clutches of up to 42, until they hatch.

== Gallery ==
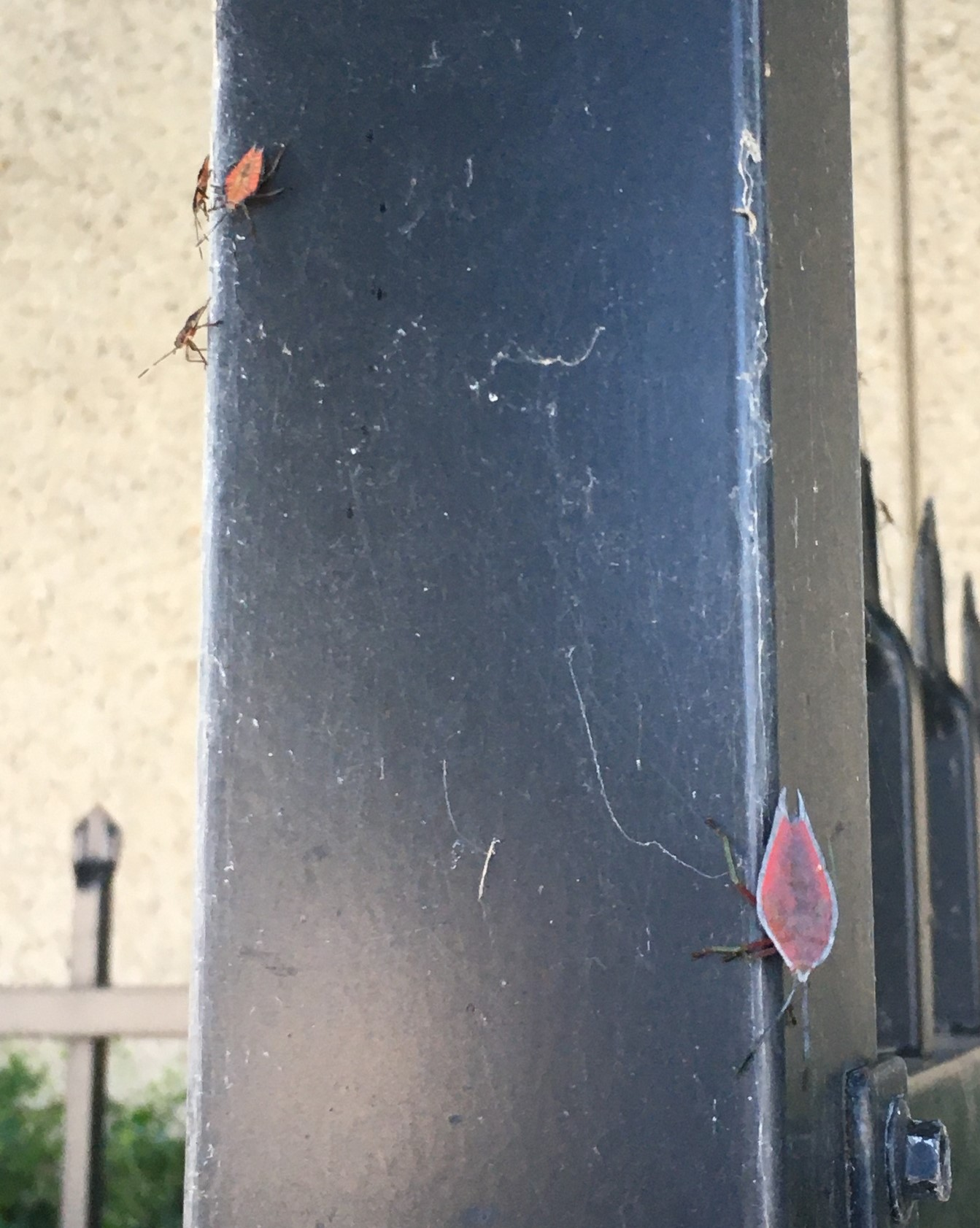
Nymphs of different stages

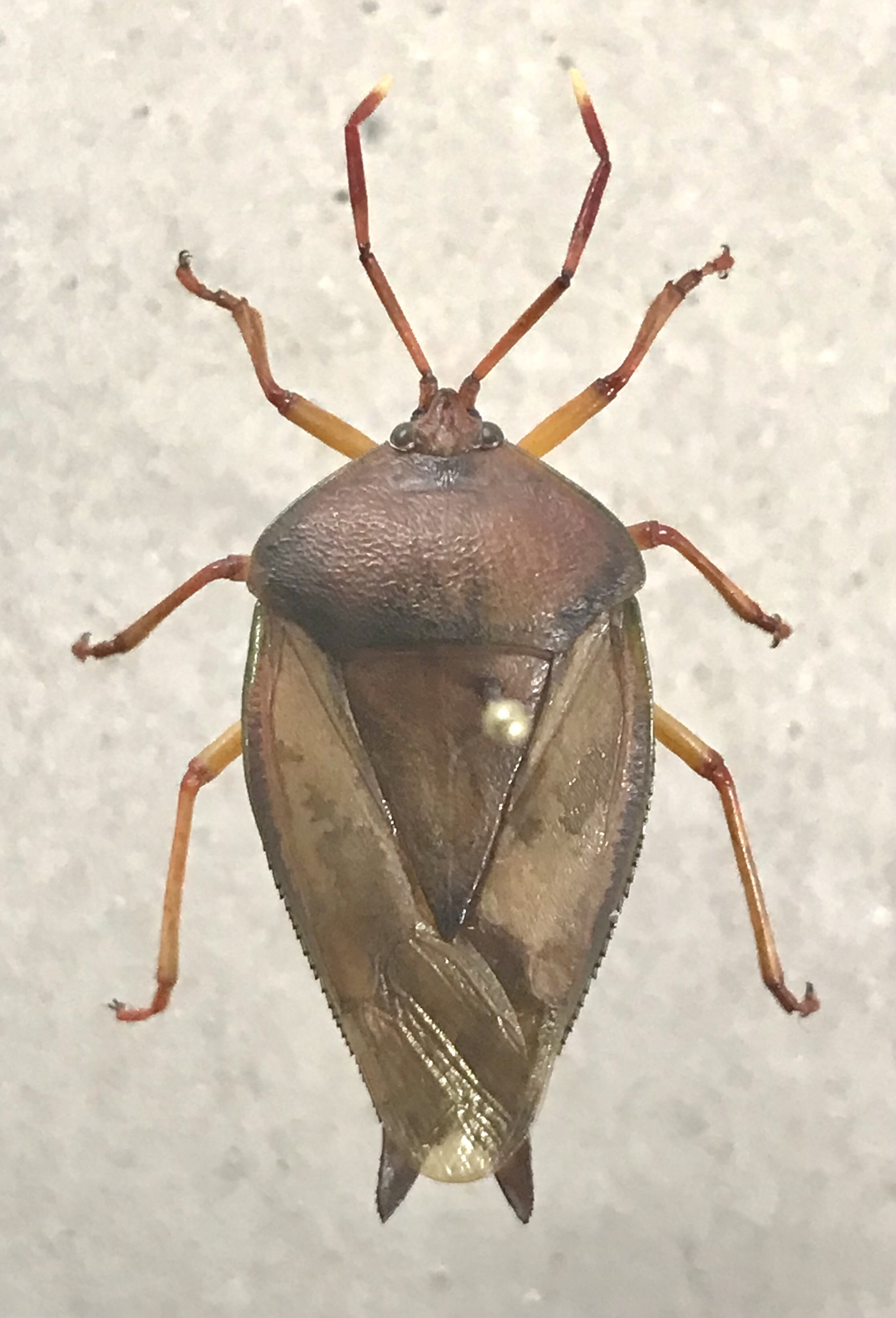
Pinned specimen, dorsal view

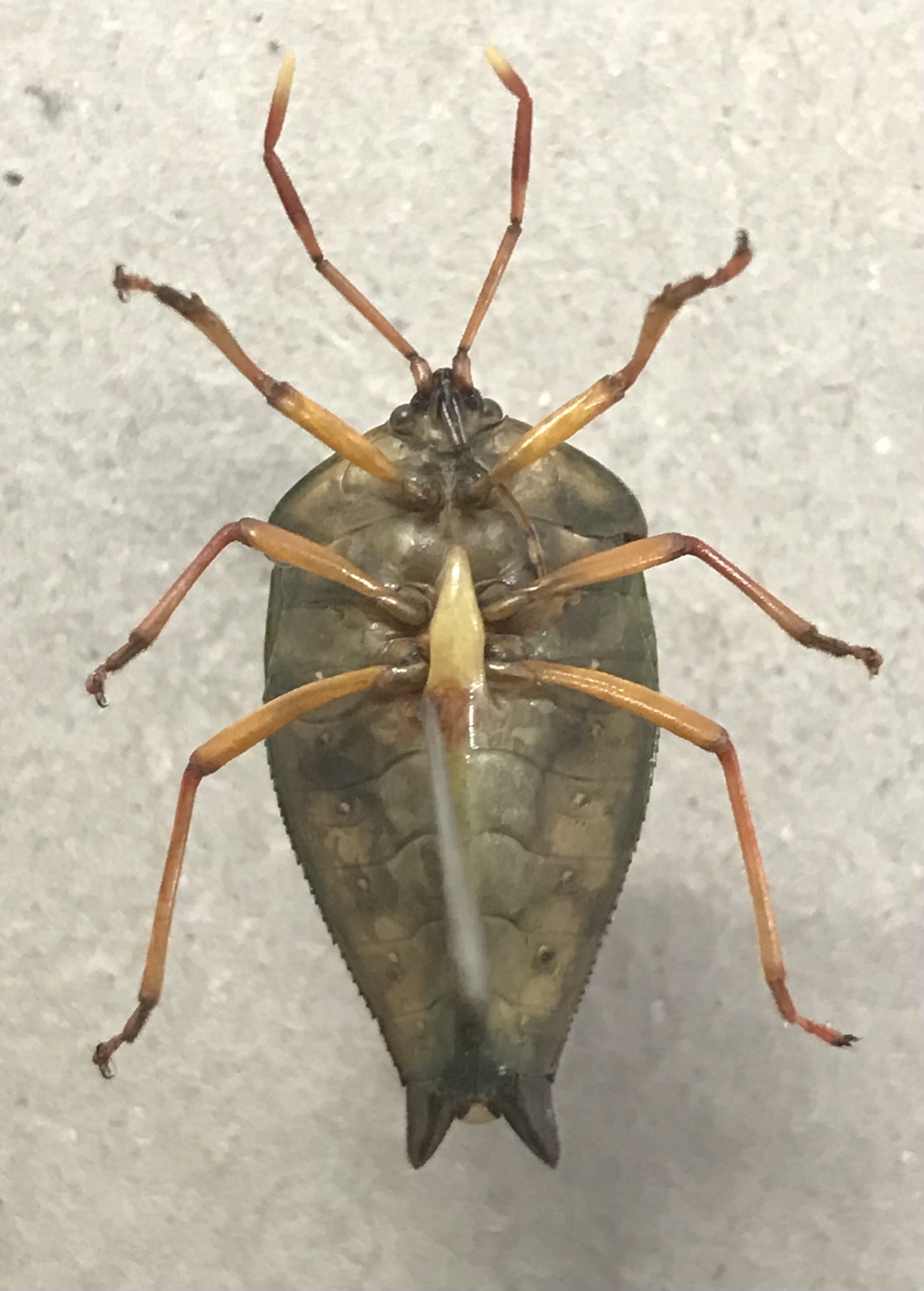
Pinned specimen, ventral view
