= Leioproctus melanopsis =

Scientific classification
- Kingdom: Animalia
- Phylum: Arthropoda
- Clade: Pancrustacea
- Class: Insecta
- Order: Hymenoptera
- Family: Colletidae
- Genus: Leioproctus
- Species: L. melanopsis

Binomial name
- Leioproctus melanopsis Batley, 2023

Species of bee

Leioproctus melanopsis, or Leioproctus (Exleycolletes) melanopsis, is a species of bee in the family Colletidae and subfamily Colletinae. It is endemic to Australia. It was described by entomologist Michael Batley in 2023.

== Etymology ==
The specific epithet melanopsis means "black-faced".

== Description ==
Female holotype body length is 11.7 mm, wing length 7.8 mm, head width 3.1 mm; male body length 9.6 mm, wing length 6.5 mm, head width 2.7 mm. Integumental colouration is mainly black with brown markings. The hair is white, yellow and black.

== Distribution and habitat ==
The species occurs in eastern Australia. The type locality is Victoria Park Nature Reserve in the Northern Rivers region of New South Wales. It has also been recorded from Eungella, Queensland.

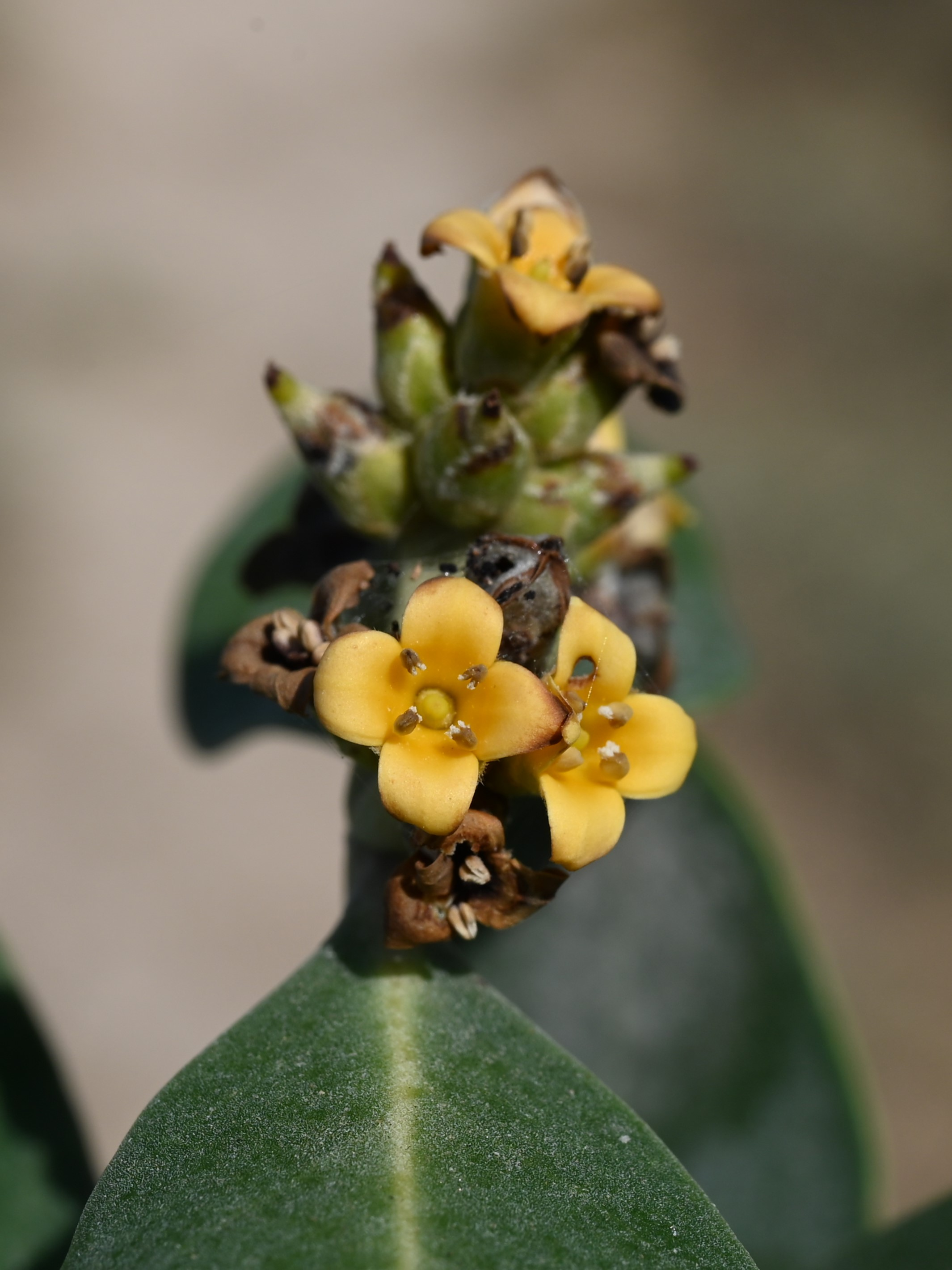
Flowers of Avicennia marina

== Behaviour ==
The adults are flying mellivores. Flowering plants visited by the bees include Alectryon coriaceus, Guioa semiglauca, Cordyline stricta, Acronychia oblongifolia and Avicennia marina, as well as Callistemon species.

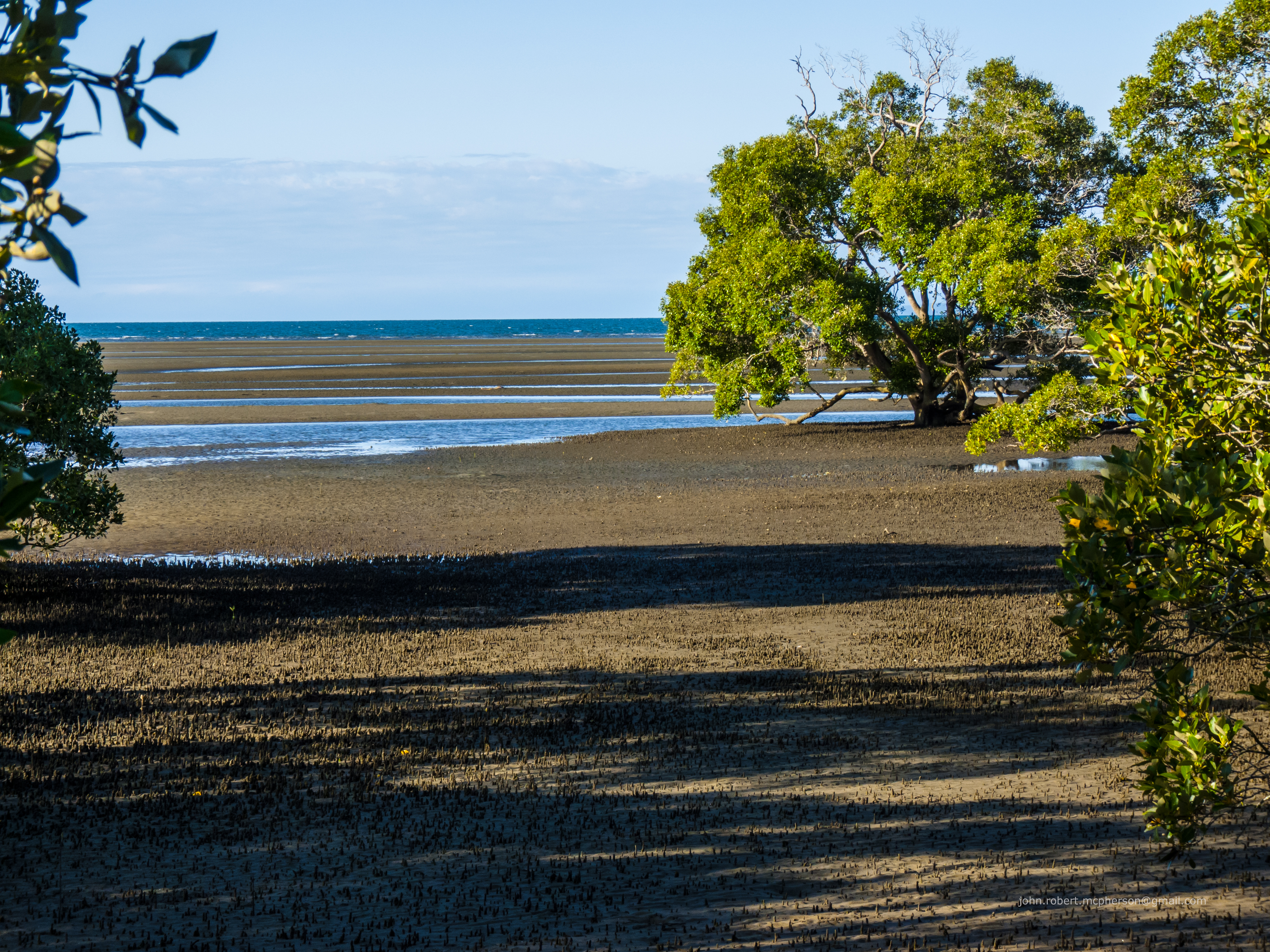
Avicennia marina (grey mangrove), a forage plant of the bees
