= Alectryon repandodentatus =

Conservation status
- Vulnerable (IUCN 2.3)

Scientific classification
- Kingdom: Plantae
- Clade: Tracheophytes
- Clade: Angiosperms
- Clade: Eudicots
- Clade: Rosids
- Order: Sapindales
- Family: Sapindaceae
- Genus: Alectryon
- Species: A. repandodentatus

Binomial name
- Alectryon repandodentatus Radlk.

Species of flowering plant

Alectryon repandodentatus is a species of plant in the family Sapindaceae. It is found in Australia and Papua New Guinea.
