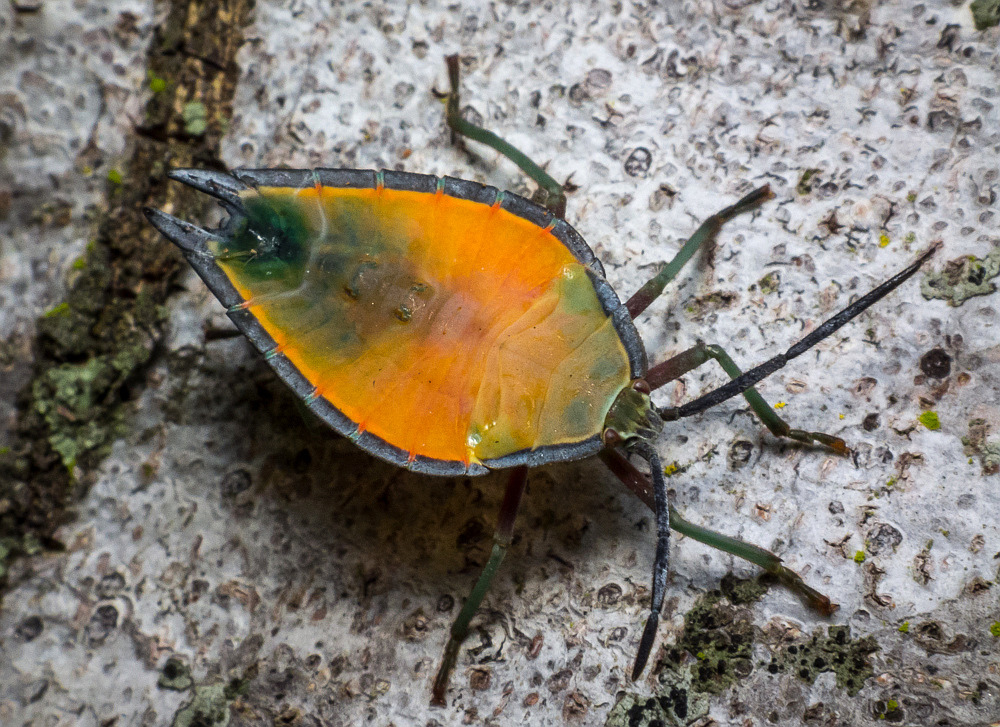
- Lyramorpha sp. nymph

Scientific classification
- Kingdom: Animalia
- Phylum: Arthropoda
- Class: Insecta
- Order: Hemiptera
- Suborder: Heteroptera
- Infraorder: Pentatomomorpha
- Superfamily: Pentatomoidea
- Family: Tessaratomidae
- Subfamily: Oncomerinae
- Genus: Lyramorpha; Westwood, 1837

= Lyramorpha =

Genus of insects

Lyramorpha is a genus of stink bugs in the family Tessaratomidae, subfamily Oncomerinae. It is known from Australia and New Guinea.

== Description and life cycle ==
As oncomerine insects, the life cycle of Lyramorpha consists of the three stages of egg, nymph and adult. Eggs are barrel-shaped and are laid in groups of 40–42. From these hatch first-instar nymphs, which are soft, semi-globular in shape and slow-moving. Intermediate stage nymphs are extremely flattened in shape, allowing them to lie flat against leaves with the vulnerable legs under the body. Nymphs also have a pair of scent glands on top of their bodies, from which they produce a pungent liquid if disturbed.

According to the original genus description, Lyramorpha adults have a very depressed body with an elongate and tapering abdomen. The head is small. The antennae are slender and 4-segmented. The rostrum extends to the bases of the midlegs. The thorax is depressed with the posterior margin produced a little above the scutellum. The scutellum is elongate and triangular with an acute tip, and in the middle is a raised longitudinal costa. The mesosternum is extended anteriorly into a small keel between the anterior legs. The ventral side of the abdomen is extended anteriorly into a sharp spine underneath the metasternum and mesosternum. The posterior end is produced into two diverging teeth.

In at least two species, L. rosea and L. parens, the first and second instars are chequered red and black, changing to a uniform red in later instars.

Both adults and the later instars of nymphs have a pair of points at the posterior end of the body, which can be seen in photographs.

== Behaviour and diet ==
Lyramorpha are active during the day (diurnal) and live on plants, from which they suck the sap. The two Australian species, L. rosea and L. parens, feed exclusively on plants in the family Sapindaceae.

Older nymphs of L. parens are gregarious, feeding in groups and travelling as groups to new feeding sites. While travelling, they may occur on non-host plants.

== Maternal care ==
Females of some species in this genus are known to care for their offspring. Lyramorpha rosea broods eggs in clutches of up to 42, and there is one record of a L. parens brooding 40 eggs.

Lyramorpha parens continues brooding its offspring until at least the second nymphal instar. Another Lyramorpha species, possibly L. maculifer, has been observed brooding first-instar and second-instar nymphs.

== Species ==
The species in genus Lyramorpha are:

- Lyramorpha ambigua Horváth, 1900
- Lyramorpha basalis Horváth, 1900
- Lyramorpha breddini Horváth, 1900
- Lyramorpha brongersmai Blöte, 1952
- Lyramorpha diluta Stål, 1863
- Lyramorpha edulis Blöte, 1952
- Lyramorpha horvathi Blöte, 1952
- Lyramorpha impar Horváth, 1900
- Lyramorpha maculifer Tryon, 1892
- Lyramorpha parens Breddin, 1900
- Lyramorpha perelegans Vollenhoven, 1868
- Lyramorpha persimilis Horváth, 1900
- Lyramorpha picta Distant, 1893
- Lyramorpha plagifer Blöte, 1952
- Lyramorpha rosea Westwood, 1837
- Lyramorpha soror Breddin, 1900
- Lyramorpha vollenhoveni Stål, 1867
