= Alectryon forsythii =

Scientific classification
- Kingdom: Plantae
- Clade: Embryophytes
- Clade: Tracheophytes
- Clade: Spermatophytes
- Clade: Angiosperms
- Clade: Eudicots
- Clade: Rosids
- Order: Sapindales
- Family: Sapindaceae
- Genus: Alectryon
- Species: A. forsythii

Binomial name
- Alectryon forsythii (Joseph Maiden & Ernst Betche) Radlk.

Synonyms
- Nephelium forsythii Maiden & Betche

Species of tree

Alectryon forsythii, commonly known as the ravine bird's eye or gorge alectryon, is a gnarled, crooked tree in the soapberry family. It is endemic to northern New South Wales, and grows to 8 metres (26 ft) tall in steep, rocky gorges in the coastal escarpment. The species is found in fire free, dry rainforest areas between 450 and 600 metres above sea level. It was collected by W. Forsyth near the Tia River in 1897. The species was first described in 1901 by Joseph Maiden and Ernst Betche as Nephelium forsythii.

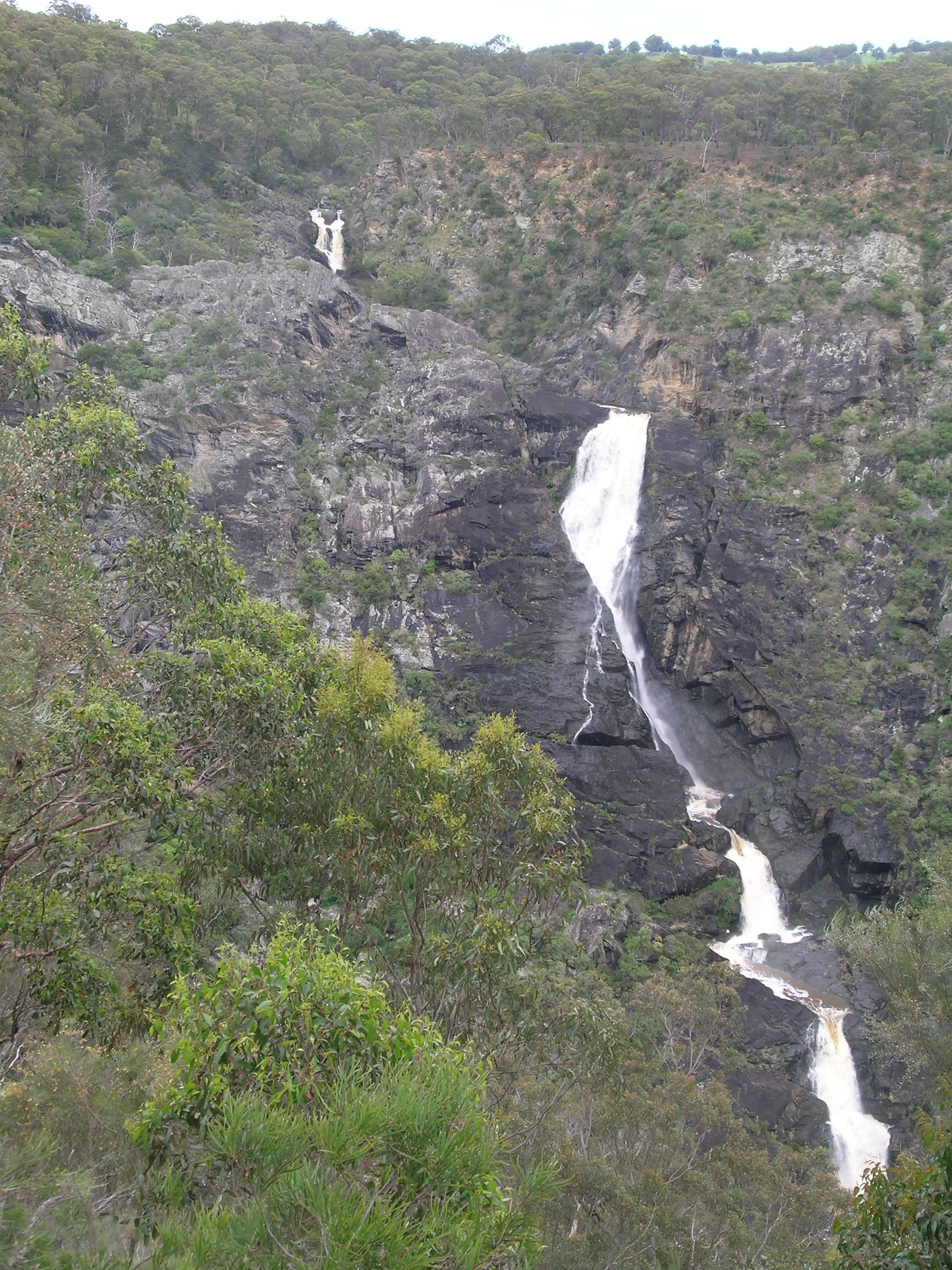
Tia Falls
