= Alectryon ramiflorus =

Conservation status
- Endangered (IUCN 2.3)

Scientific classification
- Kingdom: Plantae
- Clade: Tracheophytes
- Clade: Angiosperms
- Clade: Eudicots
- Clade: Rosids
- Order: Sapindales
- Family: Sapindaceae
- Genus: Alectryon
- Species: A. ramiflorus

Binomial name
- Alectryon ramiflorus S.T.Reynolds

Species of flowering plant

Alectryon ramiflorus is a species of endangered small seasonal rainforest trees from the plant family Sapindaceae. They are endemic to a very restricted area of southeastern Queensland, Australia. Threats of extinction to the species include habitat loss and disturbance of a catastrophic degree from wildfire or storms.
