= Podonephelium subaequilaterum =

Conservation status
- Critically Endangered (IUCN 3.1)

Scientific classification
- Kingdom: Plantae
- Clade: Tracheophytes
- Clade: Angiosperms
- Clade: Eudicots
- Clade: Rosids
- Order: Sapindales
- Family: Sapindaceae
- Genus: Podonephelium
- Species: P. subaequilaterum

Binomial name
- Podonephelium subaequilaterum Radlk.

Species of tree

Podonephelium subaequilaterum is a tree species endemic to the sclerophyllous forests of New Caledonia. This species of trees suffers from forest reduction and fragmentation due to agriculture on the west coast of the country. The main threat to the species comes from habitat destruction due to the Javan rusa deer and uncontrolled forest fires. Its area of occupancy (AOO) is estimated to be 12 square kilometres (4.6 sq mi) and its extent of occurrence (EOO) is around 15 square kilometres (5.8 sq mi). The species is observed to be in a continuing decline of its quality of habitat, number of subpopulations, extent of occurrence, area of occupancy and the number of mature individuals.

== Conservation ==
Podonephelium subaequilaterum is not protected by any local legislation and its subpopulations occur within a protected area while the dry forests benefit from a conservation program managed by the Conservatoire des Espaces Naturels.
