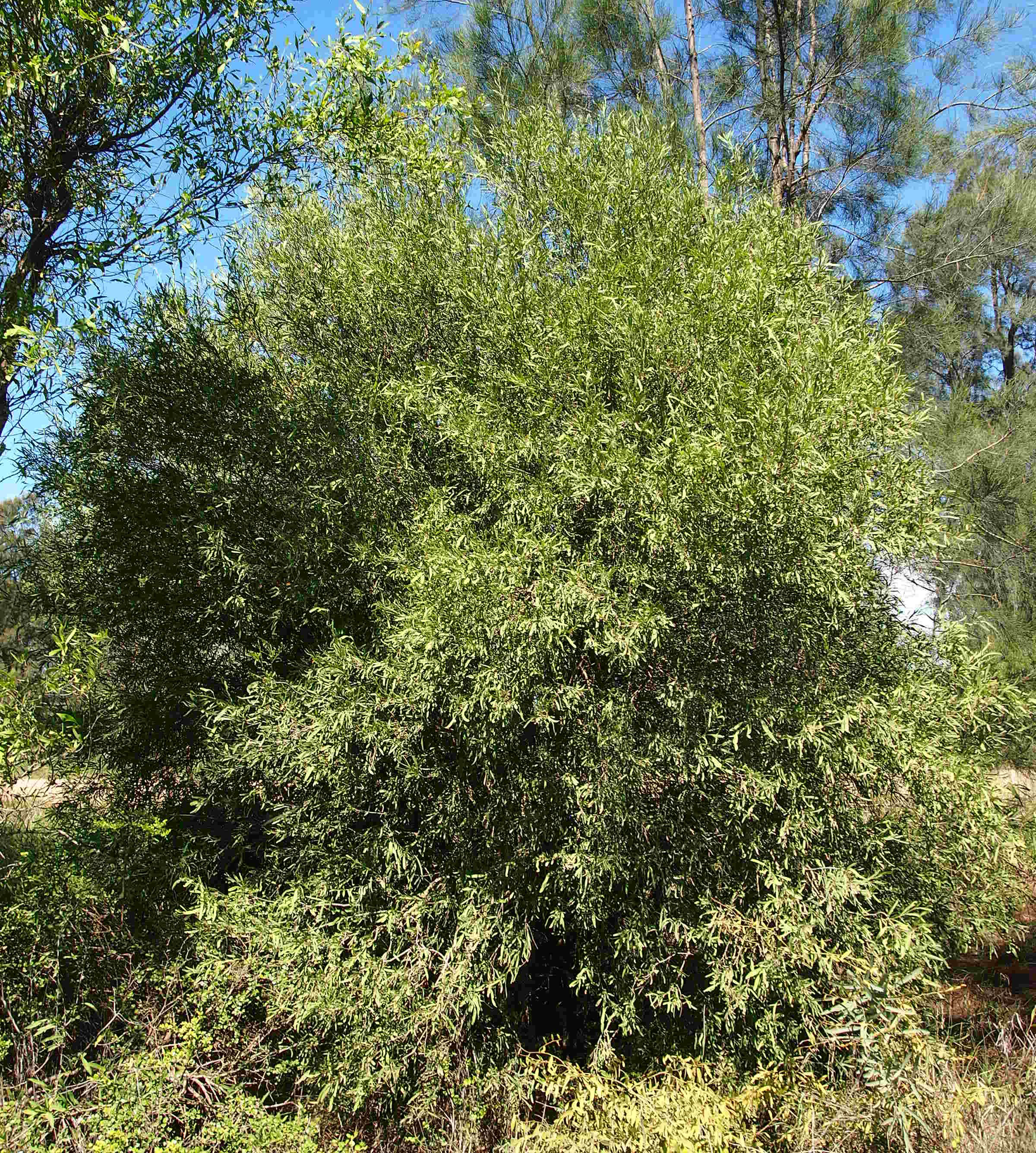

Scientific classification
- Kingdom: Plantae
- Clade: Tracheophytes
- Clade: Angiosperms
- Clade: Eudicots
- Clade: Rosids
- Order: Sapindales
- Family: Sapindaceae
- Genus: Alectryon
- Species: A. oleifolius

Binomial name
- Alectryon oleifolius (Desf.) S.T.Reynolds

Synonyms
- Heterodendrum oleifolium Desf.

= Alectryon oleifolius =

Species of flowering plant

Alectryon oleifolius, commonly known as boonaree, inland rosewood or bullock bush (South Australia), is a species of small tree of the soapberry family Sapindaceae, native to Australia.

== Taxonomy ==
The French botanist René Louiche Desfontaines described the bonaree in 1818 as Heterodendrum oleifolium, and it was reclassified in the genus Alectryon in 1987. The species name is derived from the resemblance of its leaves to those of an olive tree. It is known by a variety of common names, including western rosewood, inland rosewood, bullock bush, cattle bush, jiggo, boonery, boneree, bush minga, applebush, and red heart.

Three subspecies are recognised: subspecies elongatus is a taller plant with greener longer leaves found in more easterly parts of western New South Wales. It grows on heavier soils. Subspecies canescens has greyer foliage and is found on limestone-sand soils and is more prone to suckering. Subspecies oleifolius is found in the more northern parts of Western Australia.

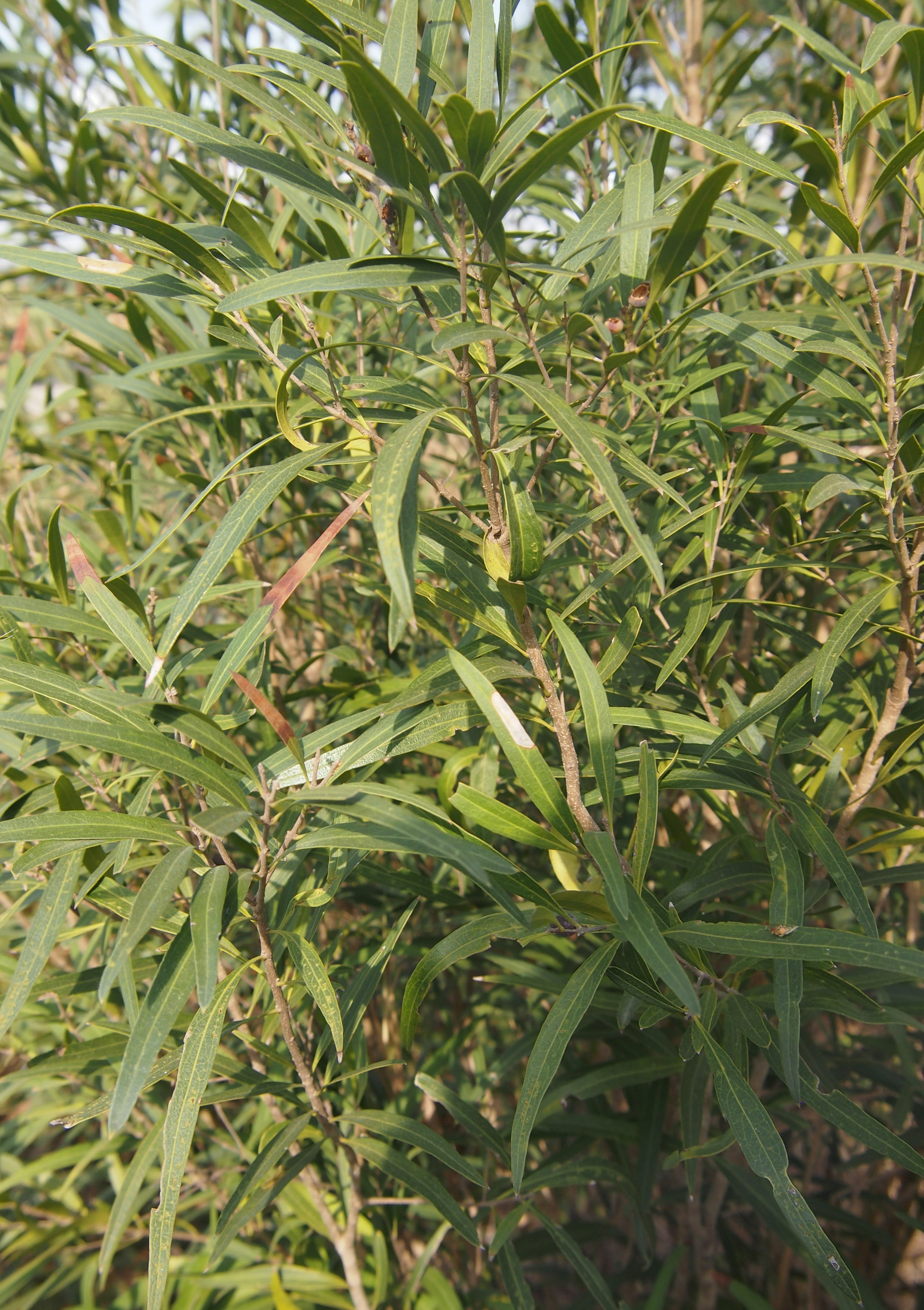
Alectryon oleifolius foliage

== Description ==
Alectryon oleifolius grows as a large shrub to medium-size tree to 9 m (30 ft) high, with drooping branches. The trunk has deeply furrowed grey to brown bark. The stiff long narrow leaves are greyish green and measure 3.5–14 cm long and 0.6–1.2 mm wide.

== Distribution and habitat ==
The range is across all states of inland Australia. In New South Wales it is found throughout the dryer parts of interior and west of the state, most commonly on sandy soils with limestone associated with belah (Casuarina cristata).

== Ecology and toxicity ==
Alectryon oleifolius sheds leaves, more commonly over the summer months. Although palatable and formerly lopped for drought fodder, Alectryon oleifolius is toxic to livestock (particularly ruminants), as it contains cyanogenic glycosides which are converted to hydrogen cyanide when digested. Poisoning is much more likely to occur with starving stock, and when new growth is consumed. At other times, the foliage has been eaten without ill-effects.

Some populations of Alectryon oleifolius reproduce by suckering, forming small stands of clonal plants.
