= Podonephelium =

Scientific classification
- Kingdom: Plantae
- Clade: Tracheophytes
- Clade: Angiosperms
- Clade: Eudicots
- Clade: Rosids
- Order: Sapindales
- Family: Sapindaceae
- Tribe: Cupanieae
- Genus: Podonephelium; Baill.

Family of shrubs and trees

Podonephelium is a genus of shrubs and trees in the family Sapindaceae. The genus is endemic to New Caledonia in the Pacific and contains nine species. Its closest relative is Alectryon.

== List of species ==
- Podonephelium concolor
- Podonephelium cristagalli
- Podonephelium davidsonii
- Podonephelium gongrocarpum
- Podonephelium homei
- Podonephelium pachycaule
- Podonephelium parvifolium
- Podonephelium plicatum
- Podonephelium subaequilaterum
