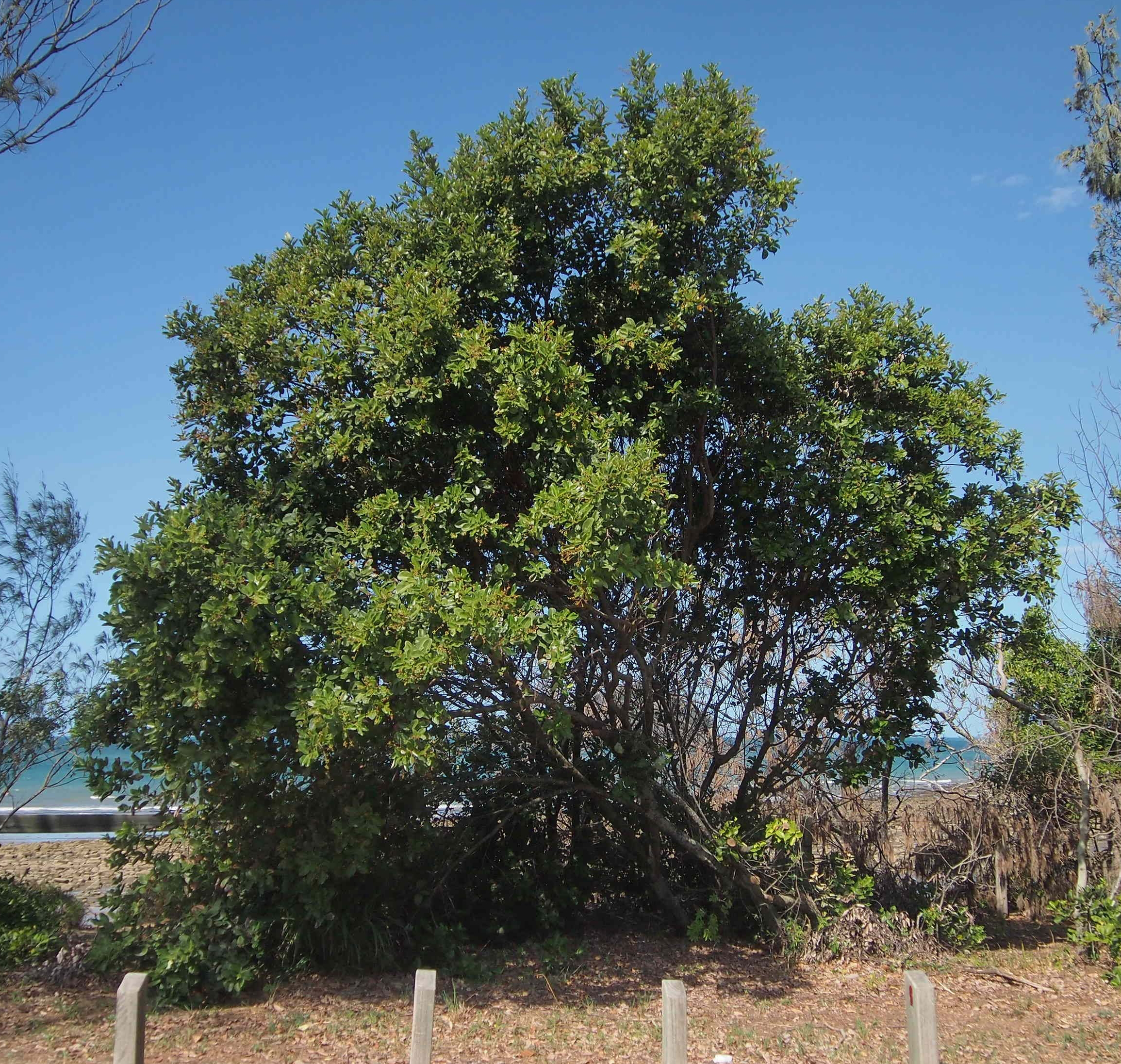

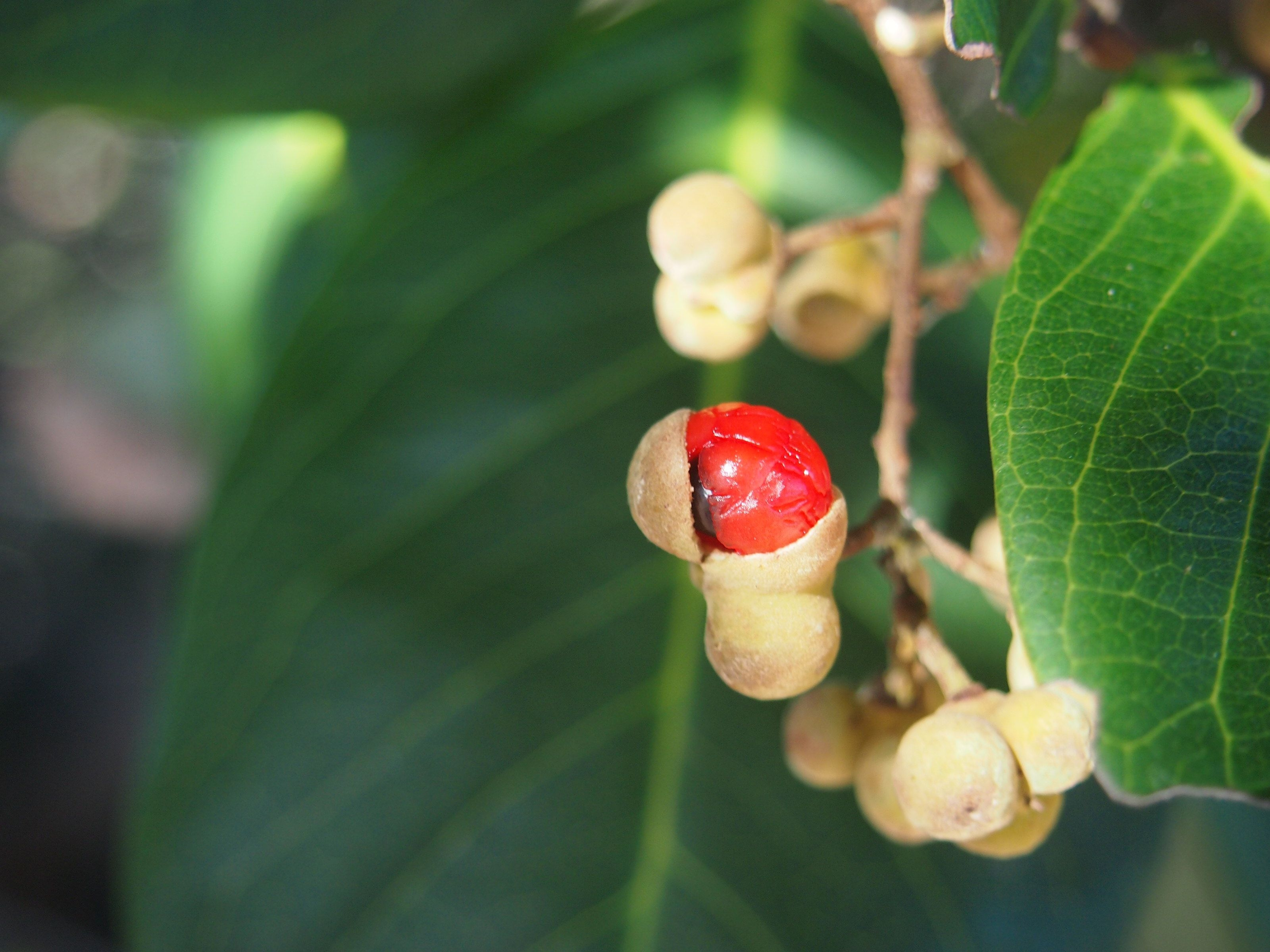
- Fruit with smooth red arils and black seeds

Scientific classification
- Kingdom: Plantae
- Clade: Tracheophytes
- Clade: Angiosperms
- Clade: Eudicots
- Clade: Rosids
- Order: Sapindales
- Family: Sapindaceae
- Genus: Alectryon
- Species: A. connatus

Binomial name
- Alectryon connatus (F.Muell.) Radlk.

Synonyms
- Spanoghea connata F.Muell.; Nephelium connatum (F.Muell.) Benth.

= Alectryon connatus =

Hairy alectryon

Species of flowering plant

Alectryon connatus, sometimes named hairy alectryon, is a species of small tree in the plant family Sapindaceae.

They grow naturally in Australia, in eastern Queensland from the south-east to northernmost Cape York Peninsula, Western Australia, perhaps in north-eastern New South Wales, and in New Guinea. They grow in littoral rainforests, vine thickets, tropical monsoon forests (seasonal rainforests) and similar vegetation assemblages, in the lowlands. In the tropical uplands they are recorded up to 800 m (2,600 ft) altitude.

== Naming and classification ==
European science formally described the species under the name Spanoghea connata in 1859, authored by German–Australian botanist Ferdinand von Mueller. In 1878, Bavarian botanist Ludwig A. T. Radlkofer formally renamed this species Alectryon connatus.

== Description ==
They grow to a small trees 12–20 m (40–70 ft) tall or sometimes as a shrub only.
