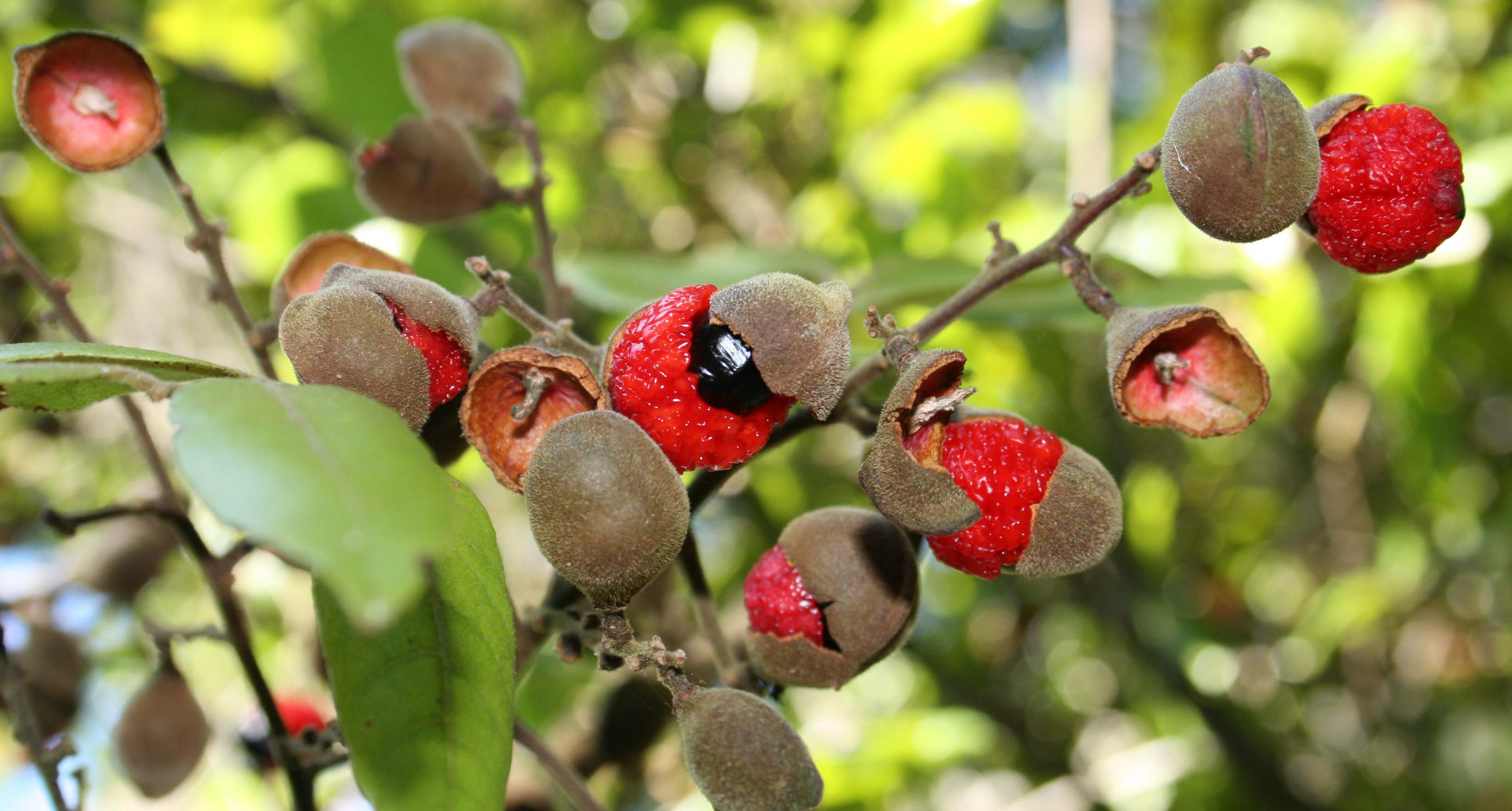
- Tītoki Alectryon excelsus (type species) fruiting, New Zealand
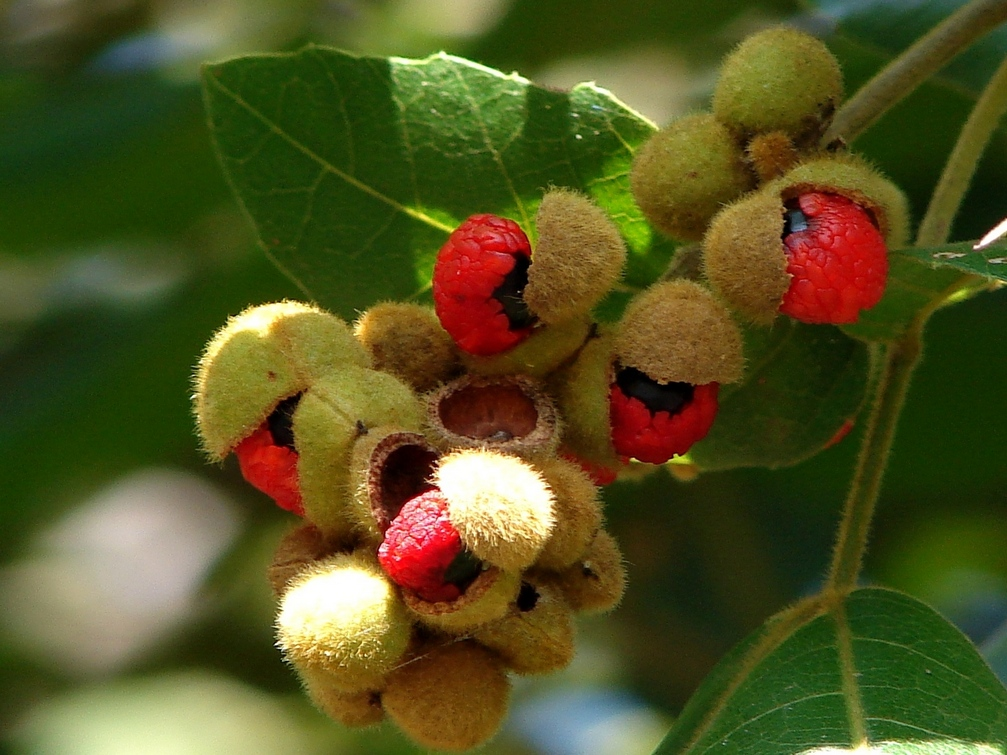
- Alectryon tomentosus fruiting, Queensland, Australia

Scientific classification
- Kingdom: Plantae
- Clade: Tracheophytes
- Clade: Angiosperms
- Clade: Eudicots
- Clade: Rosids
- Order: Sapindales
- Family: Sapindaceae
- Tribe: Cupanieae
- Genus: Alectryon; Gaertn.

Type species
- Alectryon excelsus Gaertn

Species
- See text

Synonyms
- Heterodendrum Desf.; Spanoghea Blume

= Alectryon (plant) =

Genus of flowering plants

Alectryon is a genus of about 30 species of trees and shrubs from the family Sapindaceae. They grow naturally across Australasia, Papuasia, Melanesia, western Polynesia, east Malesia and Southeast Asia, including across mainland Australia, especially diverse in eastern Queensland and New South Wales, the Torres Strait Islands, New Guinea, the Solomon Islands, New Caledonia, New Zealand, Vanuatu, Fiji, Samoa, Hawaii, Indonesia and the Philippines. They grow in a wide variety of natural habitats, from rainforests, gallery forests and coastal forests to arid savannas and heaths.

Mainland Australia, especially the eastern Queensland and New South Wales rainforests and the monsoon tropics, harbours the global centre of Alectryon species diversity, having 15 species, 12 of them endemic to Australia. In the continent of, combined New Guinea including Papua New Guinea and West Papua, Australia and all of their continental islands, including the Torres Strait Islands, known collectively in biogeography as the Sahul continent, lives the even greater diversity and endemism of 21 and 19 species, respectively.

== Conservation ==
Alectryon macrococcus scarce remaining small trees across the Hawaiian islands and in both its varieties, have obtained the "critically endangered" species global conservation status of the International Union for Conservation of Nature (IUCN).

In Australia:

- A. ramiflorus small trees only remain naturally growing in a very restricted area of southeastern Queensland, thus they have obtained the "endangered" species global conservation status of the IUCN (1998) and 2013 national and state conservation statuses of the Australian and Queensland governments.
- A. repandodentatus small trees in northeastern Qld, the Torres Strait Islands and New Guinea have obtained the "vulnerable" species global conservation status of the IUCN (1998), and the Queensland state government's 2013 "endangered" species conservation status.
- A. semicinereus small trees in eastern Qld have obtained the Qld government "near threatened" species conservation status.

== Naming and classification ==
German botanist Joseph Gaertner formally named and described this genus and the New Zealand type species A. excelsus in 1788.

The name Alectryon is derived from Greek word for "rooster". This refers to the cockscomb appearance of aril on the fruit. See also: Alectryon (mythology)

During the 1800s German–Australian botanist Ferdinand von Mueller published formal scientific descriptions of numerous Australian species under the now synonym genus name Spanoghea. In 1879 Bavarian botanist Ludwig A. T. Radlkofer published updates of numerous species to names within Alectryon. In 1988 Pieter W. Leenhouts published a revision of the genus across Malesia.

Its closest relative is Podonephelium from New Caledonia.

== Description ==
Species height varies form low shrubs to trees of 30 m. Their leathery leaves may be simple or pinnate foliage. Small flowers, form usually at the ends of the stems. Fruiting follows, when ripe each fruit opens along a rough–edged split revealing a seed, often black, surrounded by a fleshy aril, often red. These juicy aril appendages attract birds and other seed dispersing animals.

== Species ==
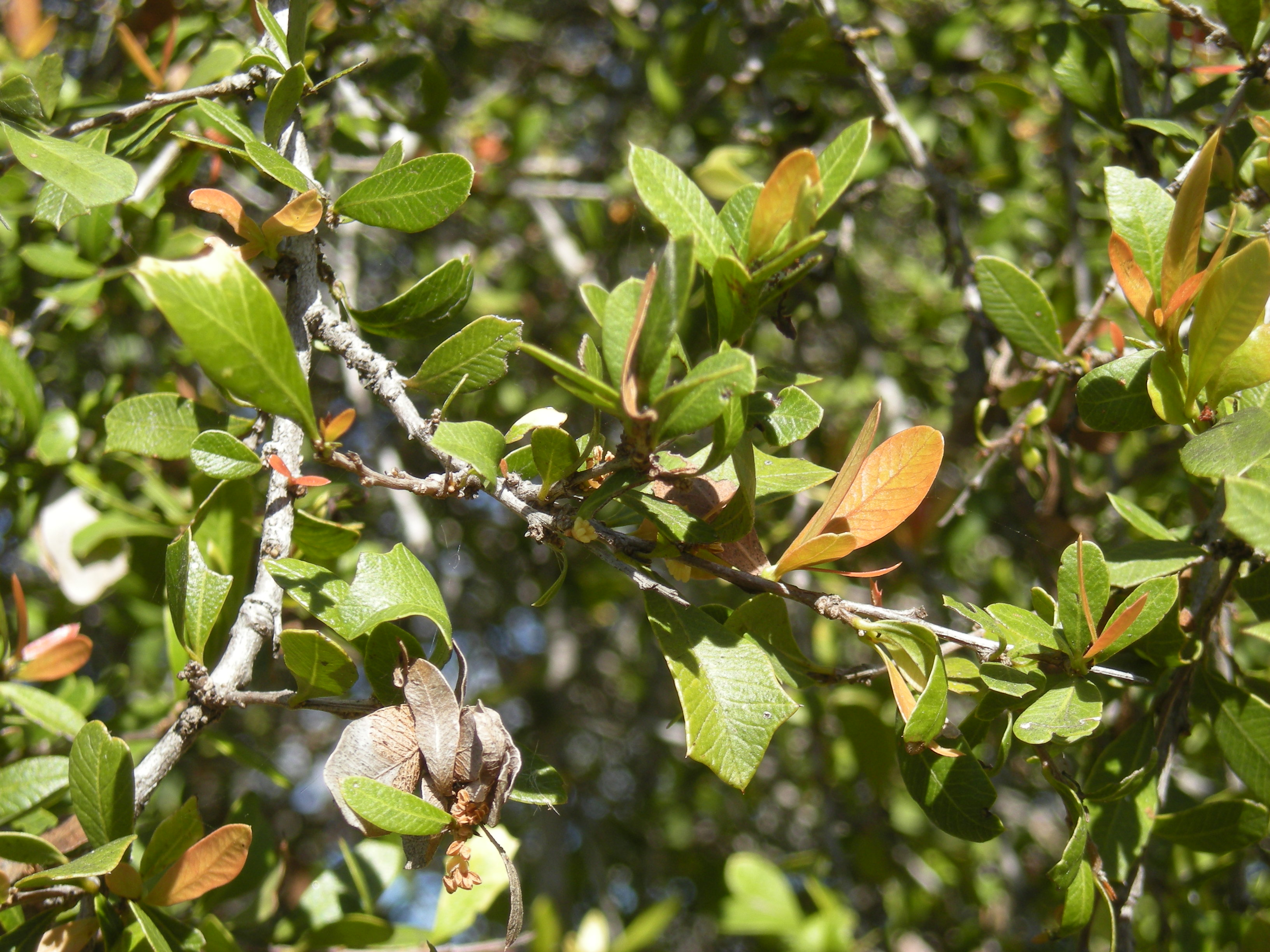
A. diversifolius foliage, Qld, Australia

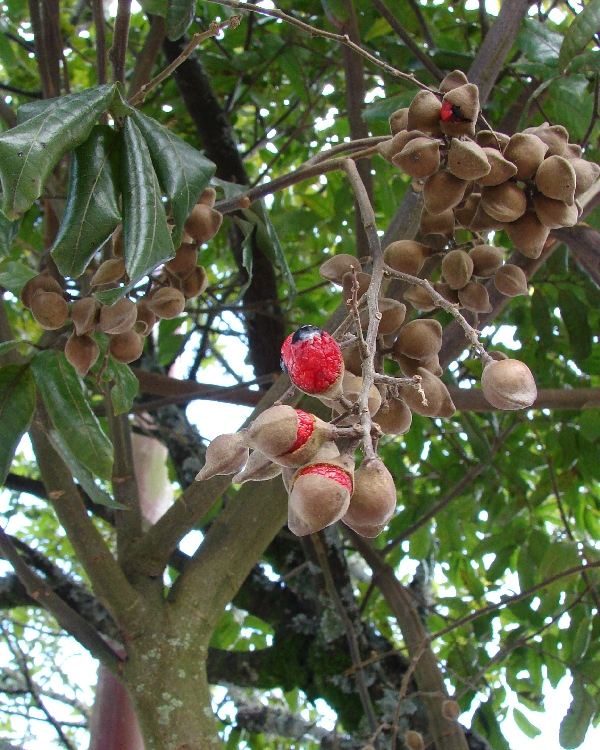
Tītoki A. excelsus (type species) fruiting, branches, New Zealand

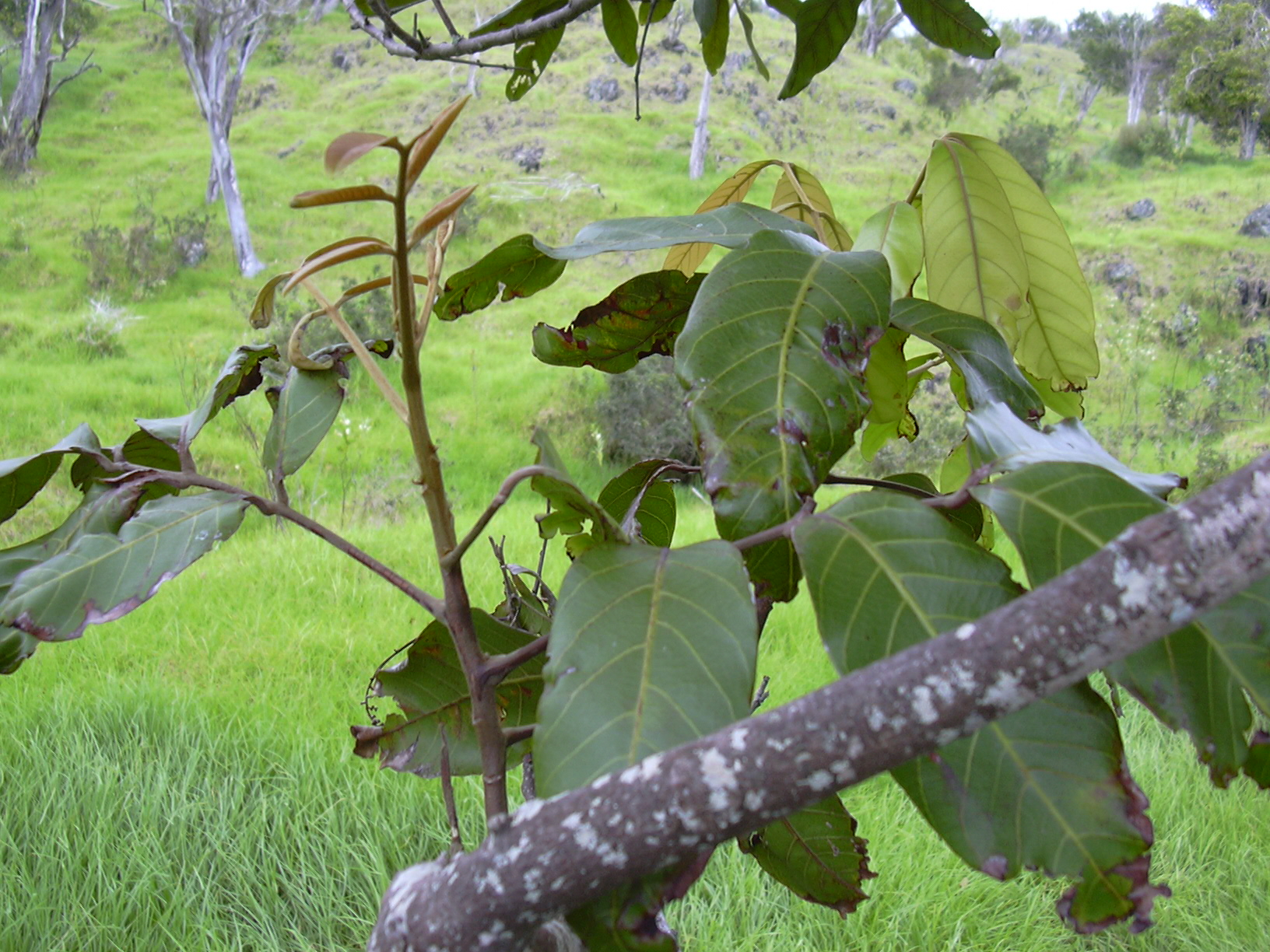
A. macrococcus var auwahiensis new growth, Maui (Hawaii)

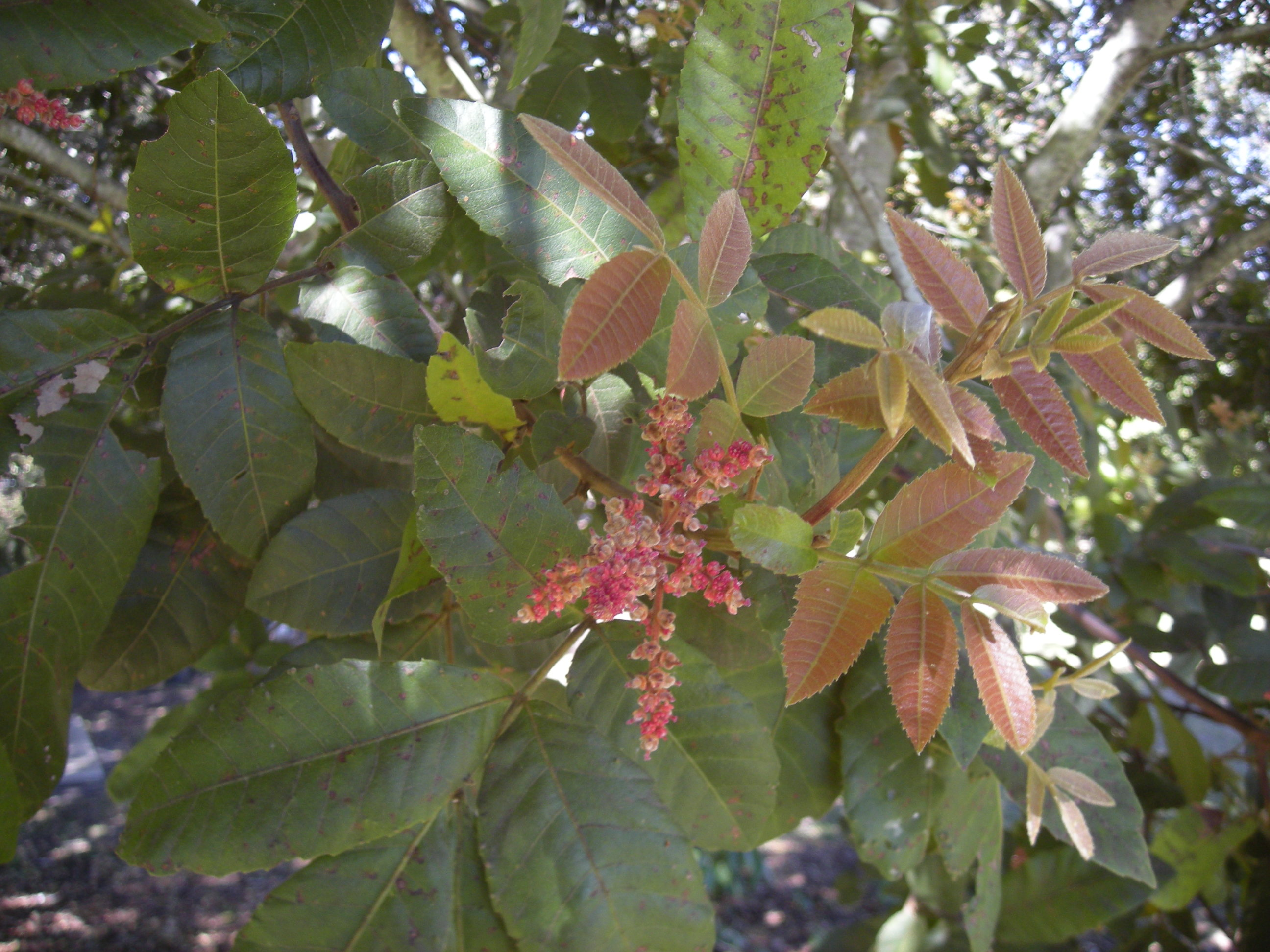
A. tomentosus foliage, flowers, Qld

This listing was sourced from the Australian Plant Name Index and Australian Plant Census, peer reviewed scientific papers, Flora Malesiana, the Australian Tropical Rainforest Plants information system, Fruits of the Australian Tropical Rainforest, the Census of Vascular Plants of Papua New Guinea, the Checklist of the Vascular Indigenous Flora of New Caledonia, the Flora of the Hawaiian Islands online version, the Flora of New Zealand online version, Flora Vitiensis (Fiji), the Flora of New South Wales and the Flora of Australia.:

- Alectryon affinis Radlk. – New Guinea
- Alectryon cardiocarpus P.W.Leenhouts – New Guinea
- Alectryon carinatum Radlk. – New Caledonia endemic
- Alectryon connatus (F.Muell.) Radlk., Hairy Alectryon – Qld, WA, Australia, New Guinea
- Alectryon coriaceus (Benth.) Radlk., Beach Bird's Eye – Qld, NSW, Australia
- Alectryon diversifolius (F.Muell.) S.T.Reynolds, Scrub Boonaree – Qld, NSW, Australia
- Alectryon excelsus Gaertn., Tītoki – New Zealand
  - subsp. excelsus, Tītoki – New Zealand
  - subsp. grandis, syn.: A. grandis, Three Kings Tītoki – Three Kings Islands offshore New Zealand
- Alectryon ferrugineus (Blume) Radlk., syn's: A. mollis Radlk., A. strigosus Radlk. – Moluccas, New Guinea
- Alectryon forsythii Radlk. – NSW, Australia
- Alectryon fuscus – Philippines
- Alectryon glaber (Blume) Radlk. – Java, Sumbawa, Flores, Sulawesi, Moluccas (–Indonesia); Philippines, etc.

synonyms: A. celebicus Radlk., A. excisus Radlk., A. inaequilaterus Radlk., Alectryon ochraceus Radlk., A. serratus Radlk., A. sphaerococcus Radlk.

- Alectryon grandifolius – Fiji endemic
- Alectryon kangeanensis Leenh. – Kangean Islands (Indonesia)
- Alectryon kimberleyanus S.T.Reynolds – WA, NT, Australia
- Alectryon macrococcus Radlk., ʻAlaʻalahua or Māhoe – Hawaii – Critically endangered
  - var. auwahiensis G.Linney – Maui, Hawaiian Islands
  - var. macrococcus Radlk. – Kauaʻi, Oʻahu, Molokaʻi, Maui, Hawaii
- Alectryon macrophyllus Kanehira & Hatusima – New Guinea
- Alectryon myrmecophilus – New Guinea
- Alectryon oleifolius (Desf.) S.T.Reynolds, Boonaree – WA, NT, SA, Qld, NSW, Vic, Australia
  - subsp. canescens S.T.Reynolds – WA, SA, Qld, NSW, Vic, Australia
  - subsp. elongatus S.T.Reynolds – NT, Qld, NSW, Australia
  - subsp. oleifolius – WA, Australia
- Alectryon pubescens S.Reynolds – Qld, Australia
- Alectryon ramiflorus S.Reynolds, Isis Tamarind – Qld, Australia – Endangered
- Alectryon repandodentatus Radlk. – Torres Strait Islands, New Guinea, Qld, Australia – Vulnerable
- Alectryon reticulatus Radlk., syn.: A. unilobatus S.T.Reynolds – Torres Strait Islands, New Guinea, Qld, Australia
- Alectryon samoensis – Samoa, Fiji
- Alectryon semicinereus (F.Muell.) Radlk. – Qld, Australia
- Alectryon subcinereus (A.Gray) Radlk., syn.: A. laevis Radlk., Wild Quince – Qld, NSW, Vic, Australia
- Alectryon subdentatus (F.Muell. ex Benth.) Radlk. – Qld, NSW, Australia
- Alectryon tomentosus (F.Muell.) Radlk., Hairy Alectryon, Woolly Rambutan, Hairy Bird's Eye – Qld, NSW, Australia
- Alectryon tropicus (S.T.Reynolds) S.T.Reynolds – NT, Qld, Australia
