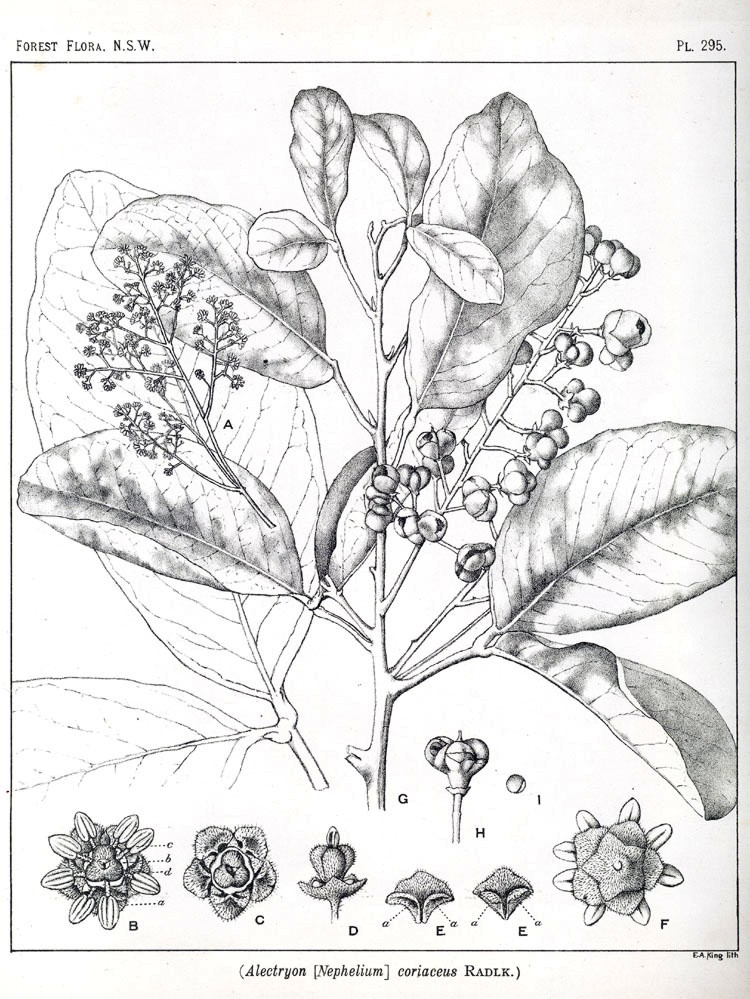

Scientific classification
- Kingdom: Plantae
- Clade: Tracheophytes
- Clade: Angiosperms
- Clade: Eudicots
- Clade: Rosids
- Order: Sapindales
- Family: Sapindaceae
- Genus: Alectryon
- Species: A. coriaceus

Binomial name
- Alectryon coriaceus (Benth.) Radlk.

Synonyms
- Nephelium coriaceum Benth.; Nephelium coriaceum Benth.; Alectryon semicinereus (F.Muell.) Radlk.; Nephelium semicinereum F.Muell.; Alectryon coriaceum

= Alectryon coriaceus =

Beach bird's eye

Species of flowering plant

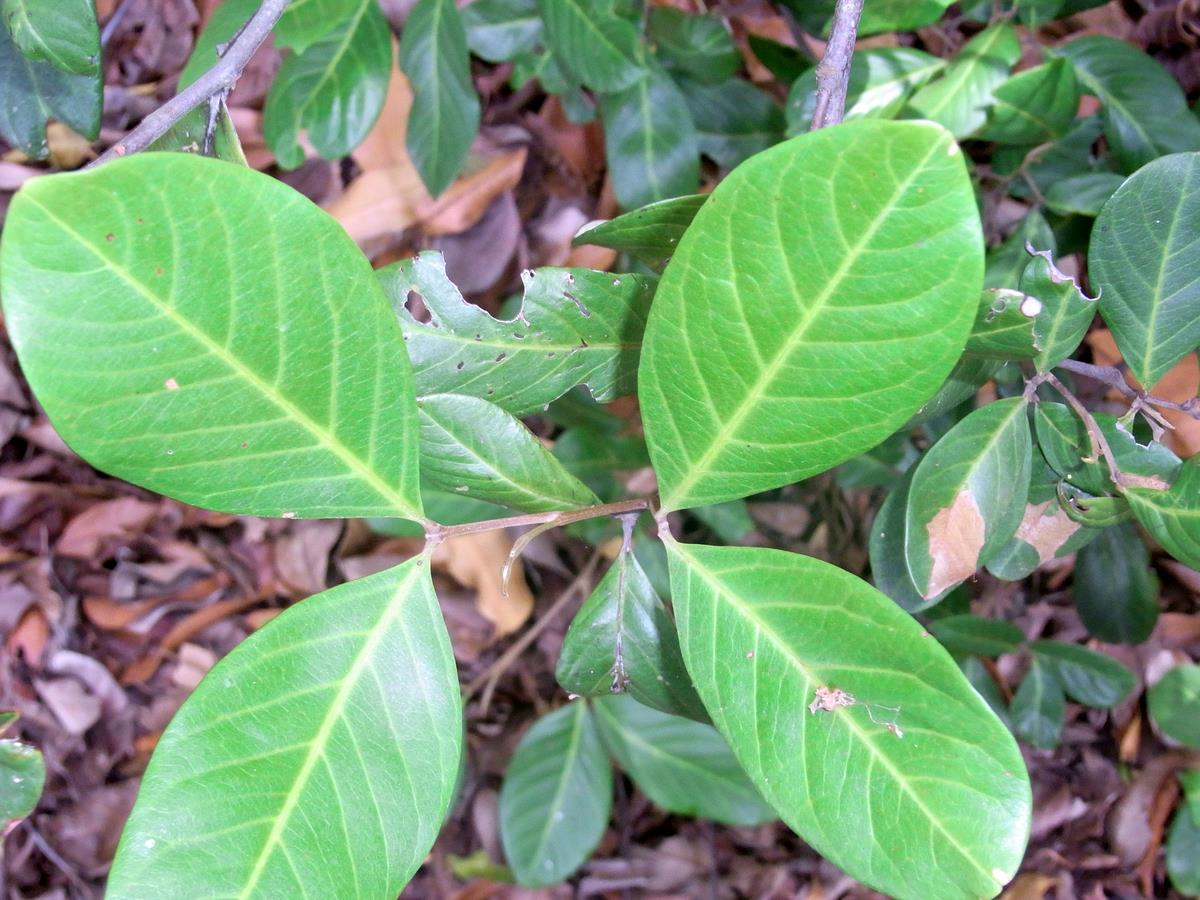
Beach bird's eye

Alectryon coriaceus, known as the beach bird's eye, or beach alectryon is a rainforest tree of the soapberry family found in eastern Australia. The specific epithet coriaceus refers to the leathery thick leaves. Leaflets are 4 to 12 cm long, and 2 to 7 cm wide.

A small tree up to 11 metres in height. Only found growing near the sea from as far south as Newcastle, New South Wales to Maryborough, Queensland. Greenish yellow flowers have tiny petals, and form in December. This tree features typical red and black fruit of this genus, maturing from March to July.
