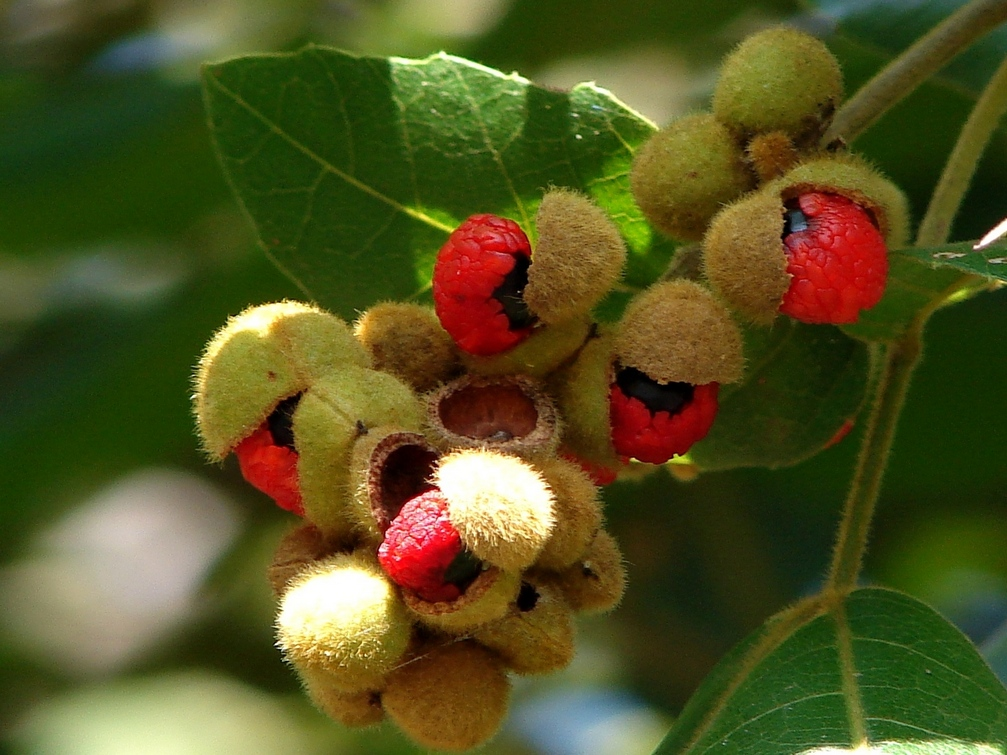

Scientific classification
- Kingdom: Plantae
- Clade: Tracheophytes
- Clade: Angiosperms
- Clade: Eudicots
- Clade: Rosids
- Order: Sapindales
- Family: Sapindaceae
- Genus: Alectryon
- Species: A. tomentosus

Binomial name
- Alectryon tomentosus (F.Muell.) Radlk.

Synonyms
- Nephelium tomentosum F.Muell.

= Alectryon tomentosus =

Red-jacket

Species of tree

Alectryon tomentosus, commonly known as the hairy birds eye, red jacket or woolly rambutan, is a rainforest tree of the family Sapindaceae found in eastern Australia. The specific epithet tomentosus refers to the hairy leaves and hairy young shoots.

It grows in many different types of rainforest on a variety of soil types. Seen as far south as the Hunter River, New South Wales and growing to the most far north eastern point of the Australian continent. In its natural habitat it may reach 15 metres (50 ft) tall and a stem diameter of 30 cm (12 in). It is generally a lot smaller in cultivation. The average normal flower and fruit drop are 40% and 90% respectively. The endosperm development is ab initio nuclear and cell formation commences at the micropylar end, proceeding towards the chalaza. The outer layers of the outer integument differentiate into the edible flesh of the fruit. Alectryon tomentosus is an attractive tree, featuring jagged edged leaves, pink flowers and red fruit. The trunk is grey and smooth. It is often planted in gardens, parks or as a street tree. Green catbirds have been noticed eating the fruit.

First described in 1857 by Ferdinand von Mueller as Nephelium tomentosum from a collection on the Brisbane River, it gained its current binomial name when reclassified by Ludwig Adolph Timotheus Radlkofer.

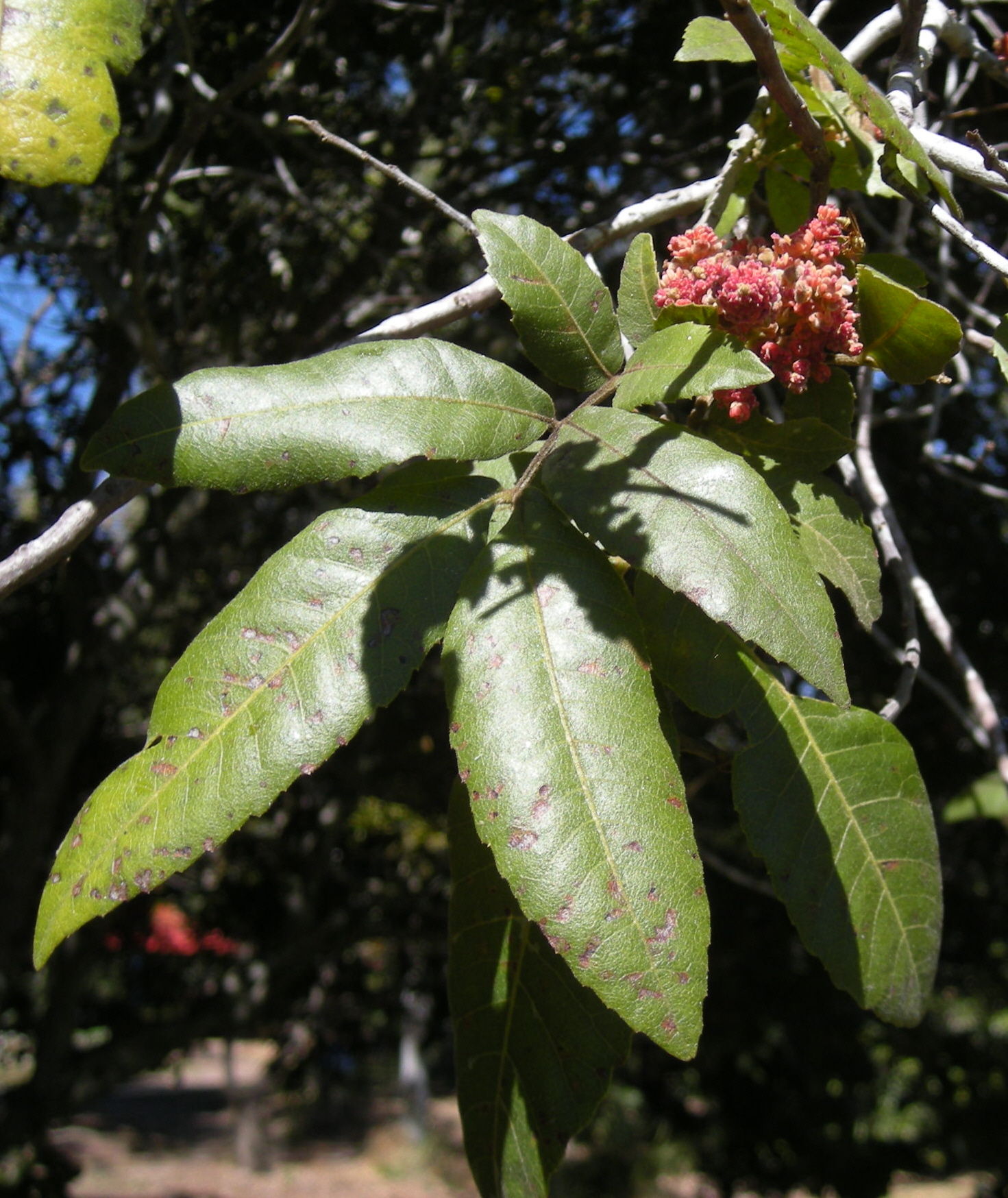
Leaves and flowers

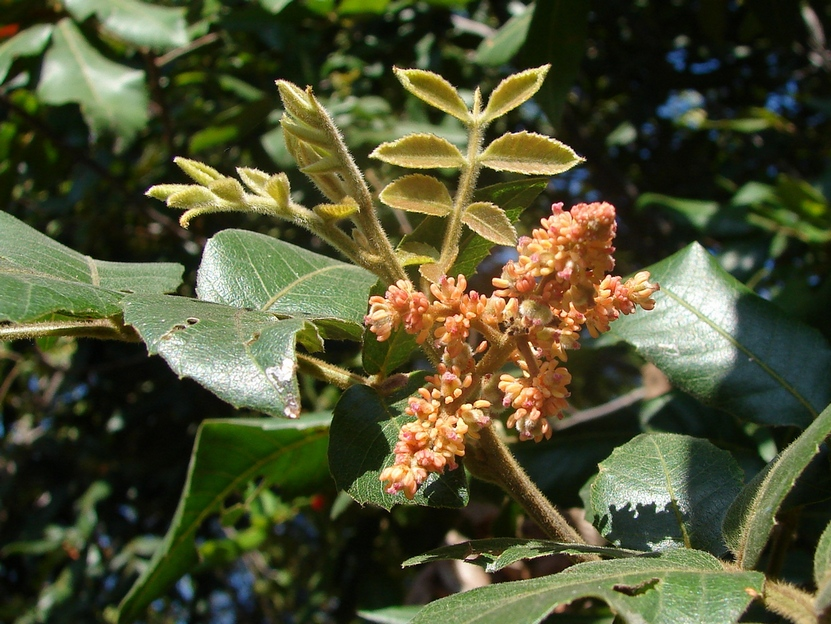
Leaves and flowers

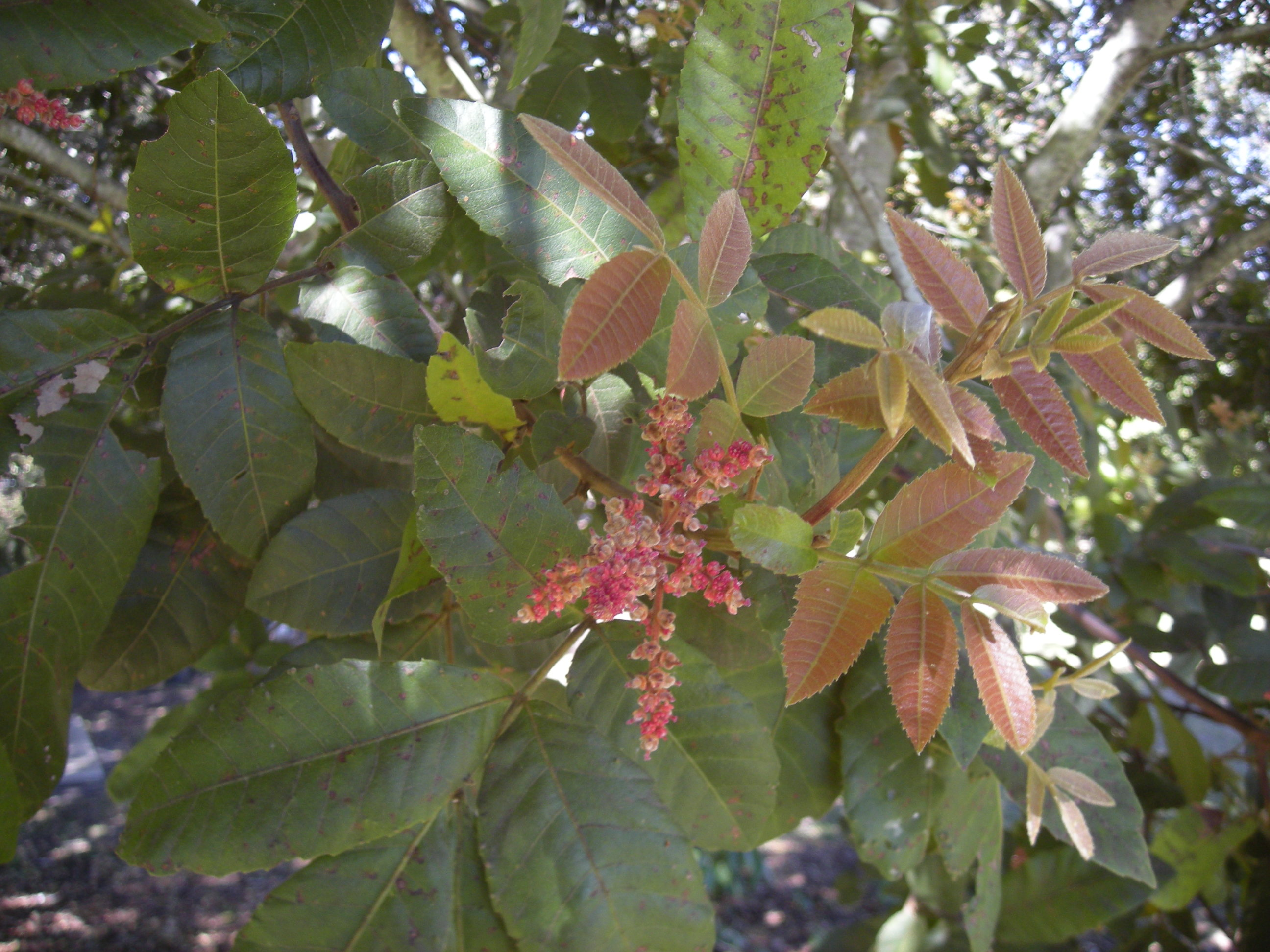
Leaves and flowers
