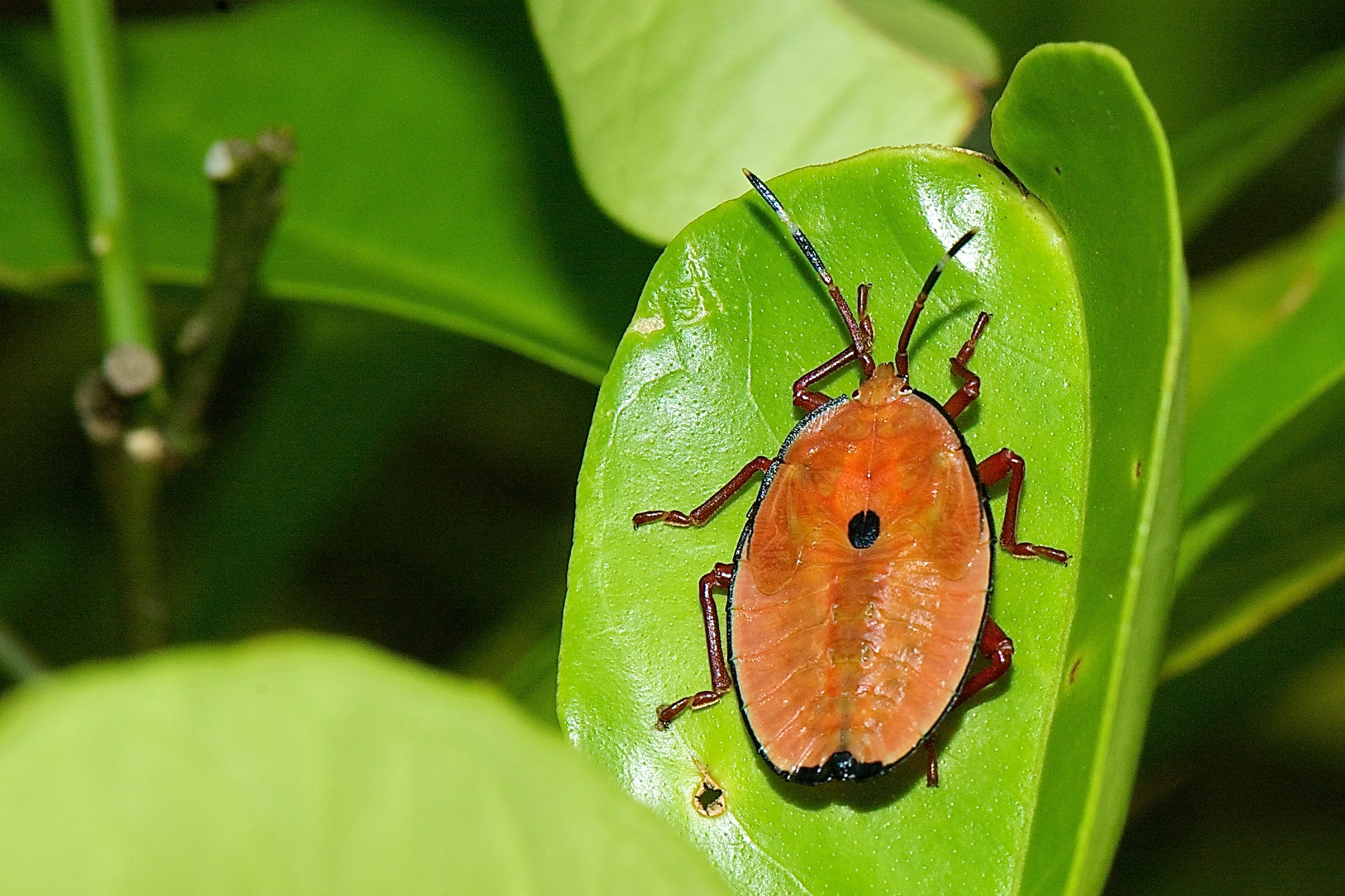
- Musgraveia sulciventris

Scientific classification
- Domain: Eukaryota
- Kingdom: Animalia
- Phylum: Arthropoda
- Class: Insecta
- Order: Hemiptera
- Suborder: Heteroptera
- Family: Tessaratomidae
- Genus: Musgraveia; Leston & Scudder, 1957

= Musgraveia =

Genus of true bugs

Musgraveia is a genus of true bugs in the family Tessaratomidae, mostly found in Australia. The two species are Musgraveia antennatus and Musgraveia sulciventris.
