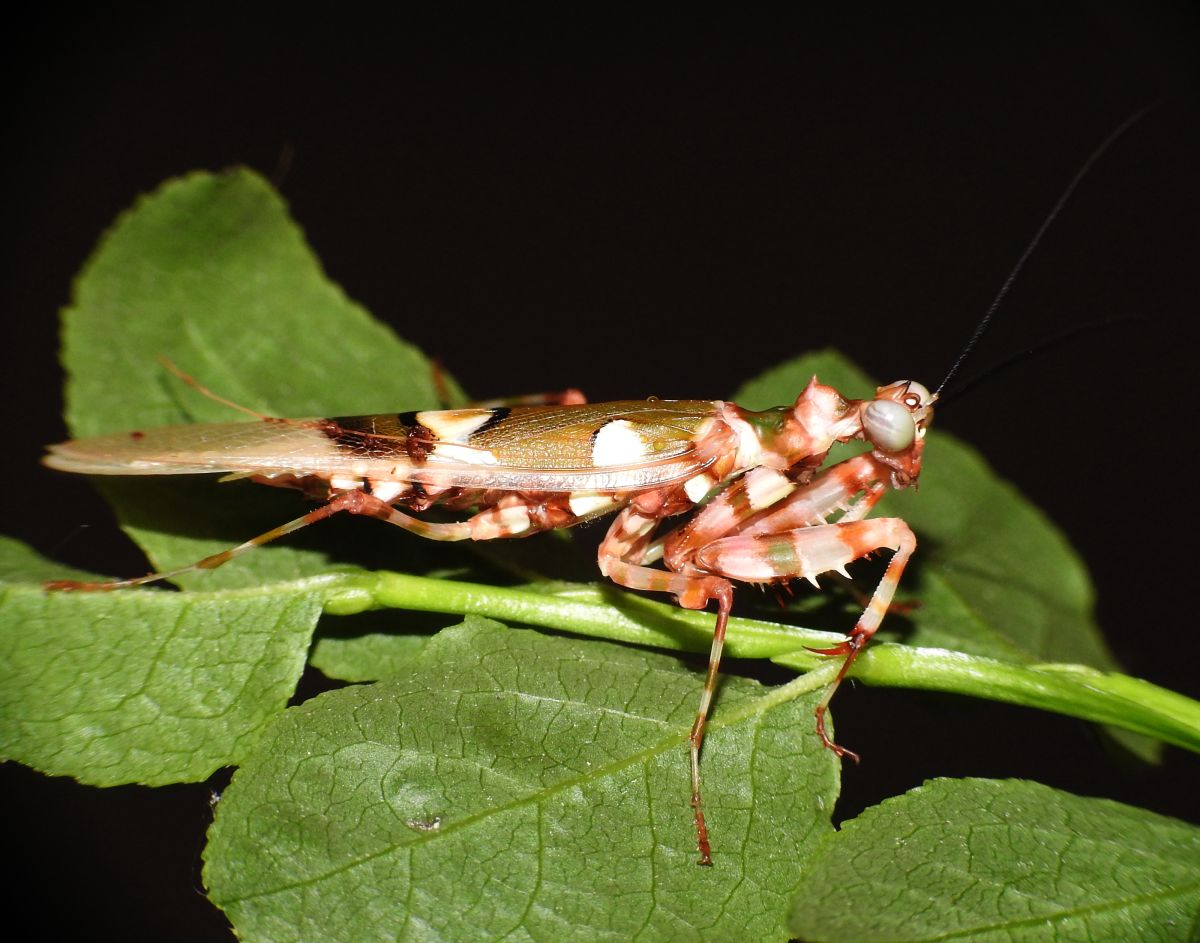

Scientific classification
- Kingdom: Animalia
- Phylum: Arthropoda
- Clade: Pancrustacea
- Class: Insecta
- Order: Mantodea
- Family: Hymenopodidae
- Genus: Chlidonoptera
- Species: C. lestoni

Binomial name
- Chlidonoptera lestoni Roy & Leston, 1975

= Chlidonoptera lestoni =

Species of praying mantis

Chlidonoptera lestoni, Leston's chlidonoptera, is a species of praying mantis in the family Hymenopodidae.

== See also ==
- List of mantis genera and species
