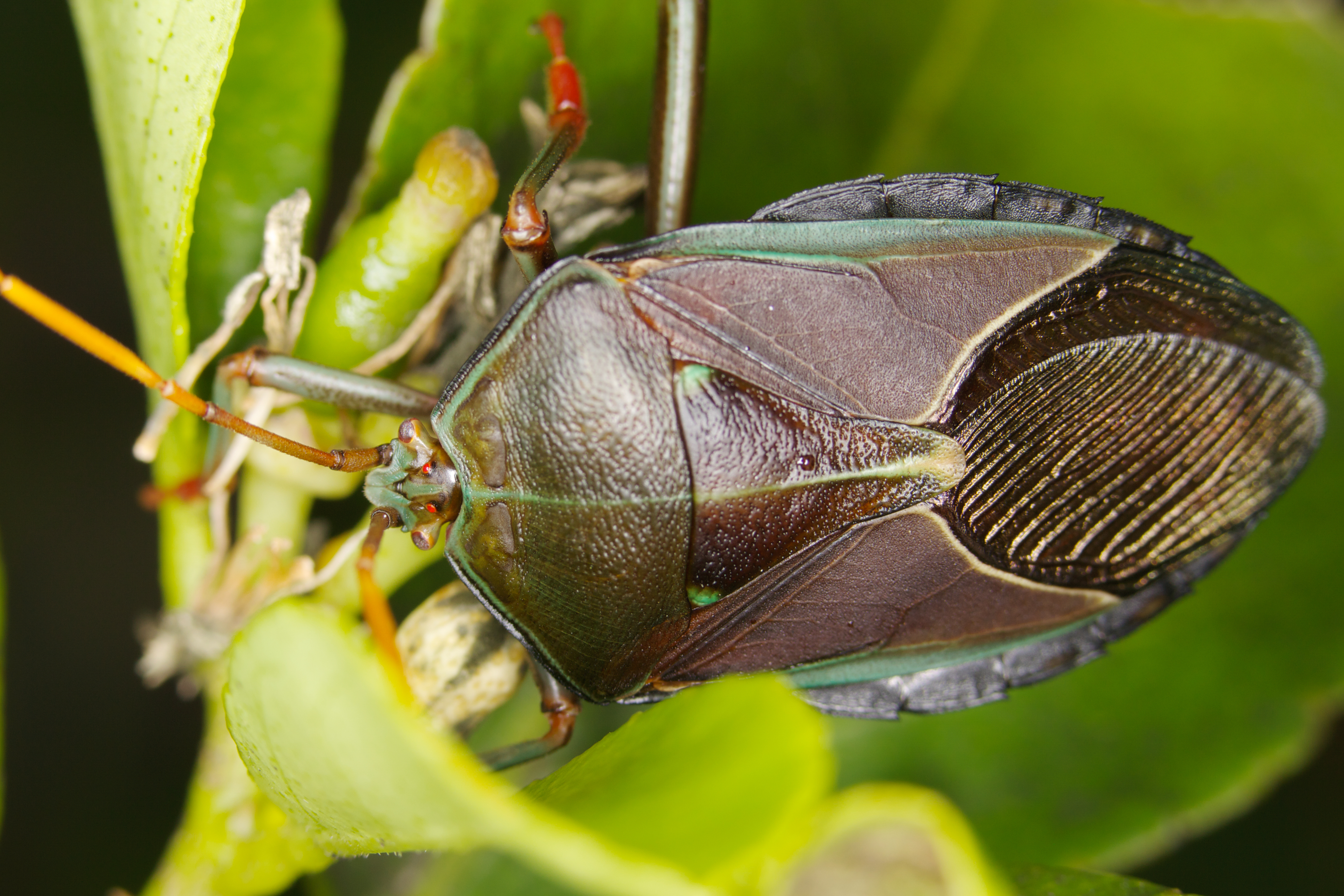

Scientific classification
- Kingdom: Animalia
- Phylum: Arthropoda
- Clade: Pancrustacea
- Class: Insecta
- Order: Hemiptera
- Suborder: Heteroptera
- Family: Tessaratomidae
- Genus: Musgraveia
- Species: M. sulciventris

Binomial name
- Musgraveia sulciventris (Stål, 1863)

Synonyms
- Oncoscelis sulciventris

= Musgraveia sulciventris =

Bronze Orange Bug

Species of true bug

Musgraveia sulciventris is a Tessaratomid bug found in Australia, sometimes known as the bronze orange bug. It is considered a pest, particularly to plants in the citrus group. Bronze orange bugs suck the sap from trees, which causes the flowers and fruit to fall.

== Taxonomy ==
In 1863, Swedish entomologist Carl Stål described the species as Oncoscelis sulciventris from a collection near Moreton Bay in Queensland. In 1957, English entomologists Dennis Leston and G.G.E. Scudder reclassified the bronze orange bug as Musgraveia sulciventris, due to reorganization of Oncoscelis and related genera. It is the type species of the genus Musgraveia and in the Tessaratomidae family.

== Description and life cycle ==
Bronze orange bugs are first found on trees in late winter. Mating takes place between late November through early March. Each mating pair takes 3 to 5 days to produce 10 to 14 eggs. The female lays up to four clutches of eggs and deposits them on the undersurface of a leaf. The bright green spherical eggs are around 2.5 mm (0.1 in) in diameter. The incubation period varies based on current weather conditions. Hatching averages around 7.4 days at 25 °C and 6 percent humidity. As a light green nymph, they are difficult to spot and often mistaken for different species. The bronze orange bug has five stages of development known as instars. The first instars remain huddled near the eggs. They are transparent pale green with orange eyes. The second instars are more buff or pale yellow. Adults grow to be approximately 25 mm (0.98 in) long, and go from orange to their more familiar bronze color as they develop.

Life cycle of Musgraveia sulciventris
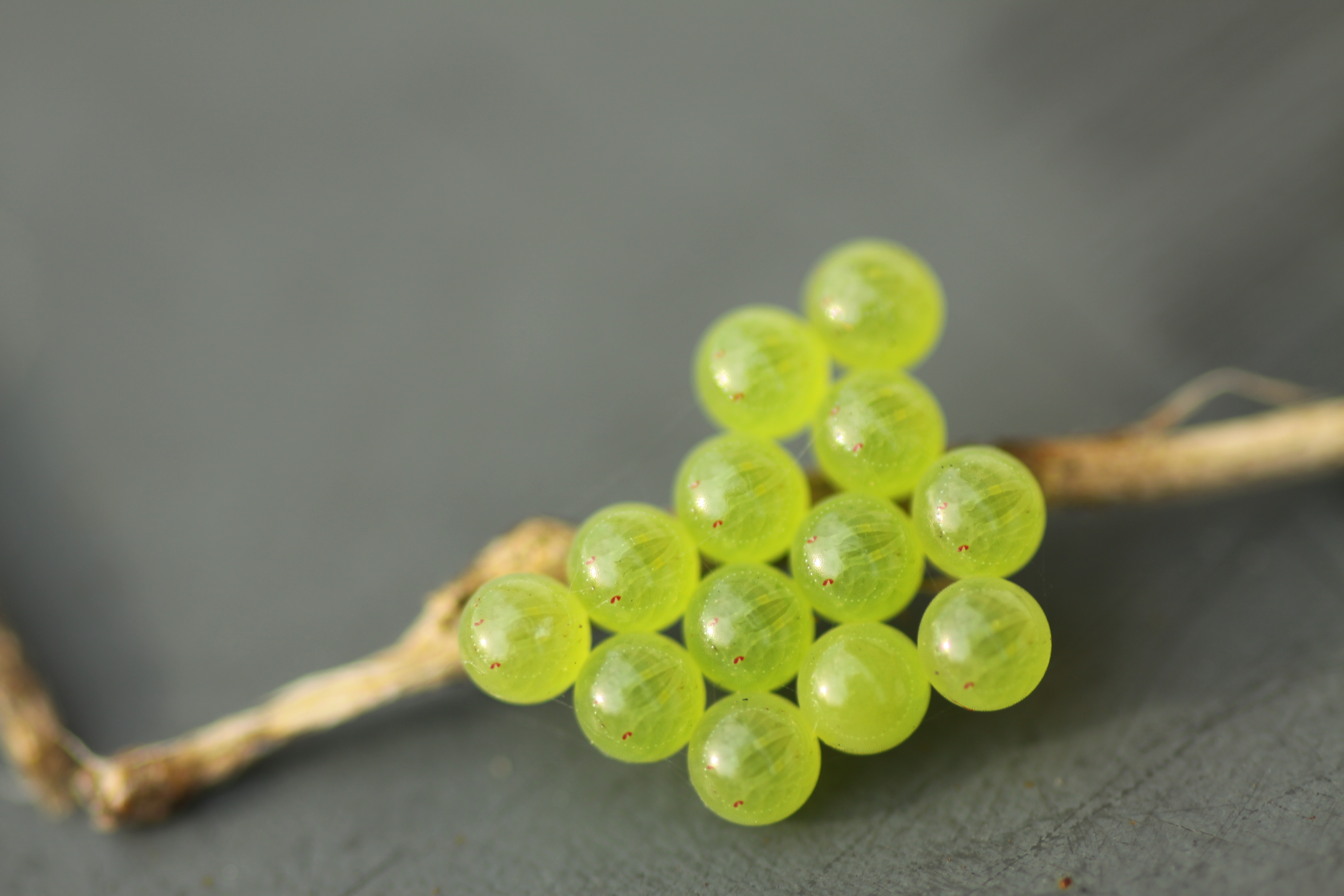
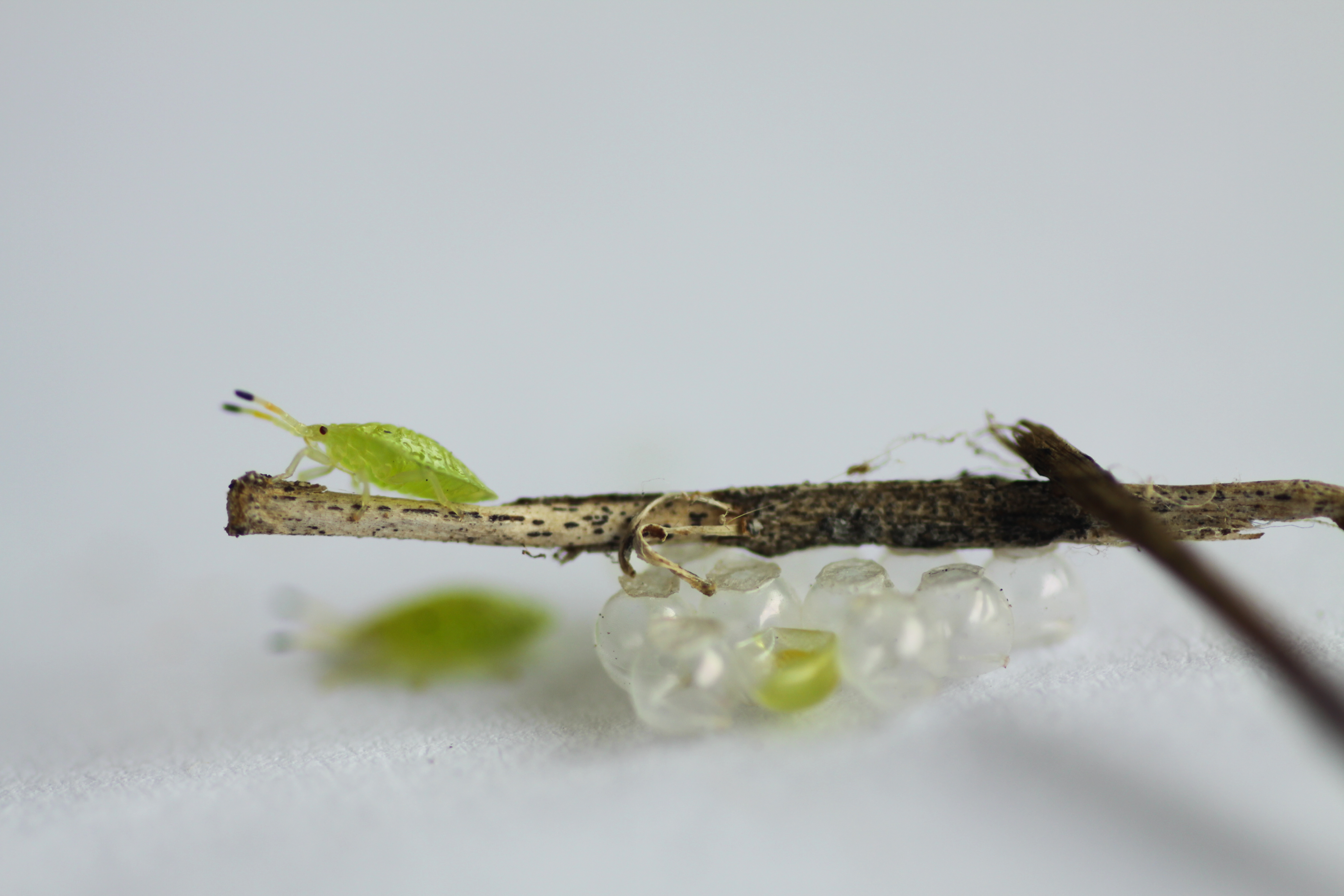
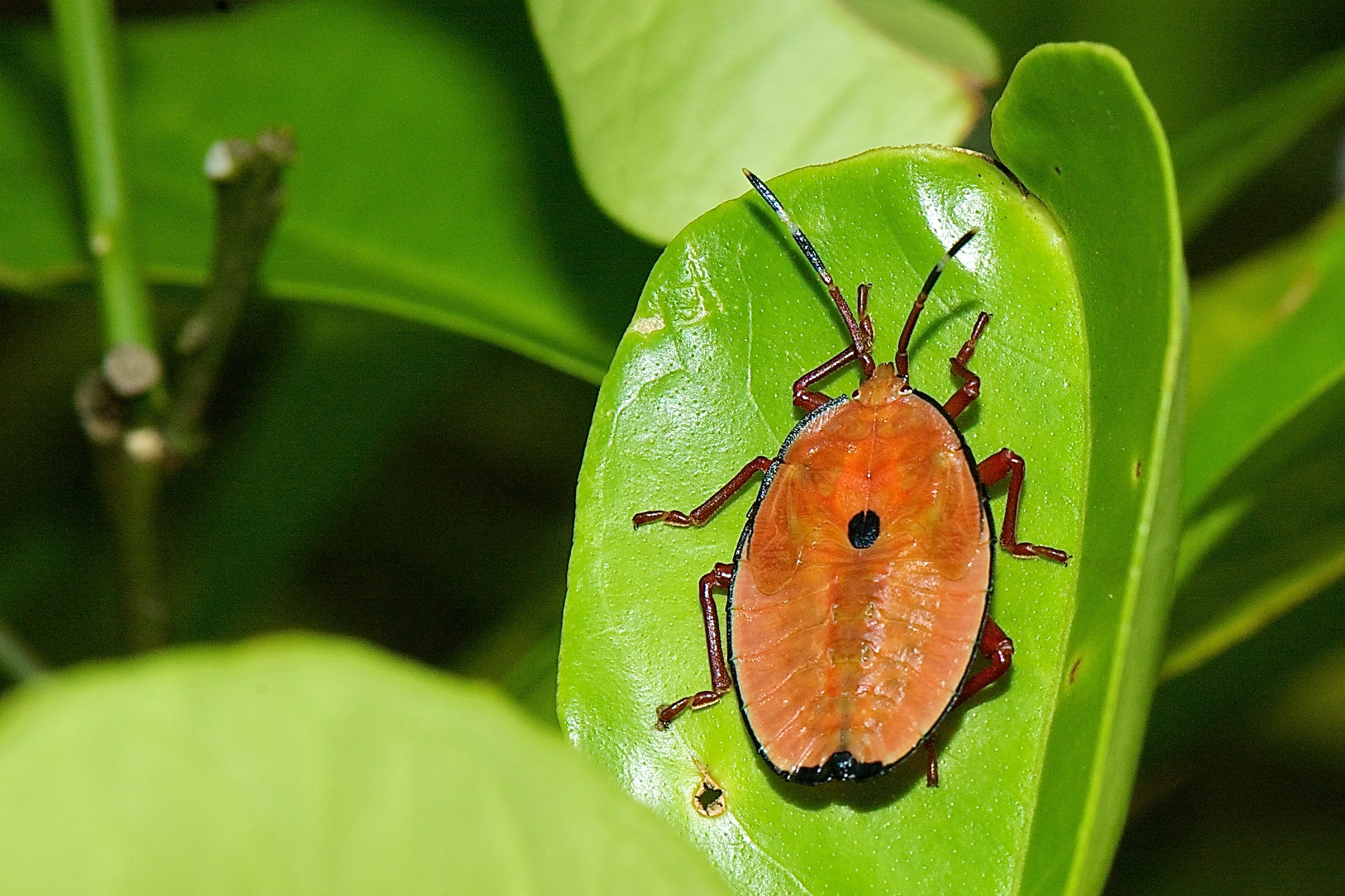
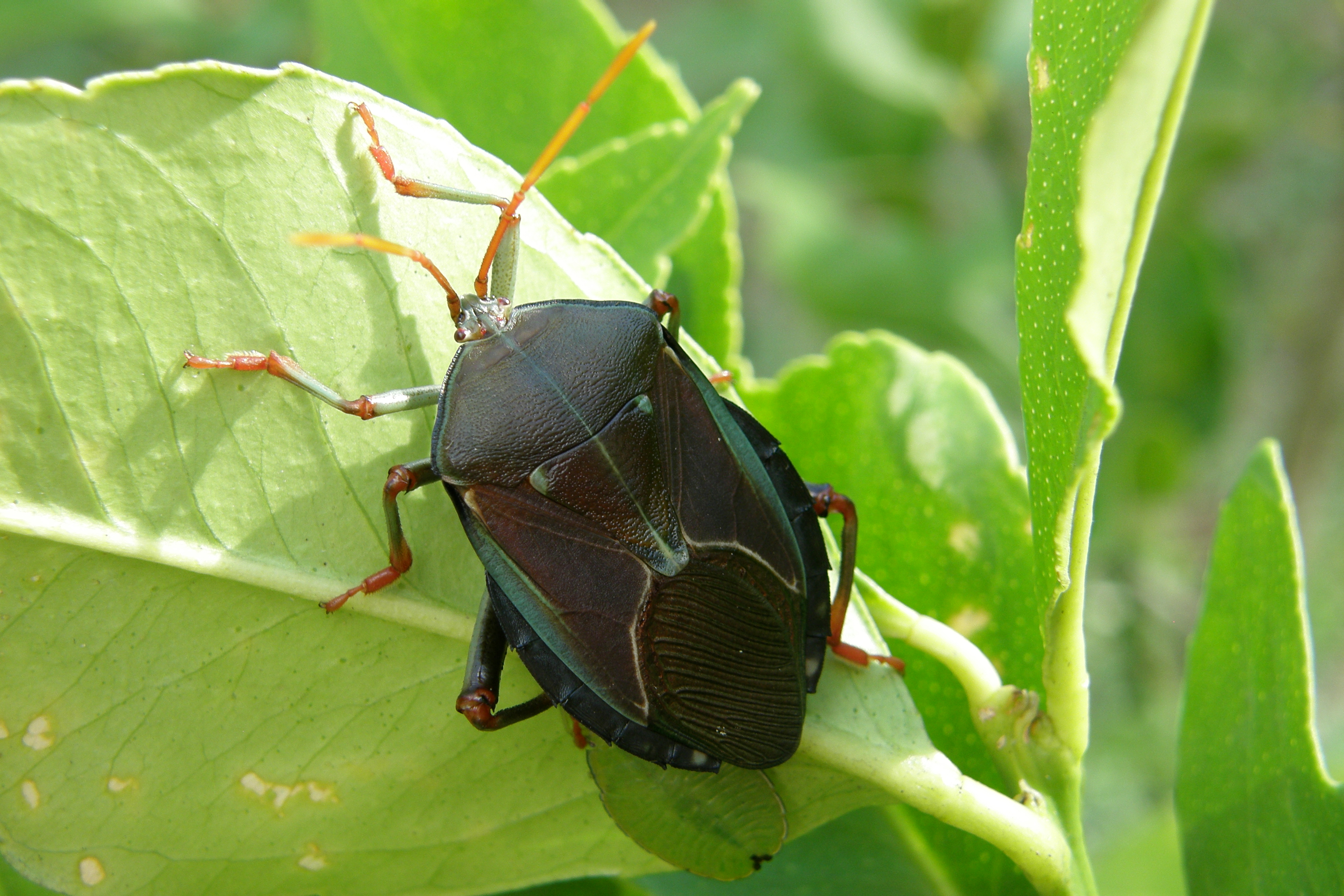
Left: A cluster of bronze orange bug eggs. The embryos can be seen through the clear egg membranes, as well as the small ring of micropylar processes on each egg. The second egg from the bottom right is unfertilized and remains a murky green; Center left: Nymphs emerging from the eggs. Early instars of bronze orange bugs are bright green in color; Center right: A fourth or fifth instar nymph resting on a citrus leaf. It is now brilliantly orange in color with black margins and a small black dot at the center of its body; Right: An adult bronze orange bug on the underside of a citrus leaf. The adults are much drabber in color than the nymphs. Below it is also a green third instar nymph.

== Distribution and habitat ==
Musgraveia sulciventris is found in Queensland and New South Wales in Eastern Australia, as far south as Canberra. Its range of location has spread significantly since European colonization.

== Ecology ==
Its native host plants include the desert lime (Citrus glauca), the Australian finger lime (Citrus australasica), and Correas. It has become a major pest of cultivated citrus crops, where it sucks the fluid from new growth and young fruit, causing them to turn yellow and drop off. Whole crops can be devastated.

The common name of stinkbug refers to a malodorous liquid that the insect sprays when threatened. It is composed of alkanes, cimicine and aldehydes from glands in the thorax. These compounds primarily serve as protection against fellow arthropods, to which they are lethal. However, the defensive chemicals of M. sulciventris are known for being among the most debilitating to vertebrates, which is likely a defense specifically aimed against birds. They can cause damage to human skin and even cause temporary blindness if sprayed into the eyes. The bronze orange bug can spray the liquid at a target up to 0.6 m (2 ft) away.

Insects that prey on the bronze orange bug include the common assassin bug (Pristhesancus plagipennis), the predatory Asopinae bug species Amyotea hamatus, and the parasitoid wasps Eupelmus poggioni and Telenomus spp.
