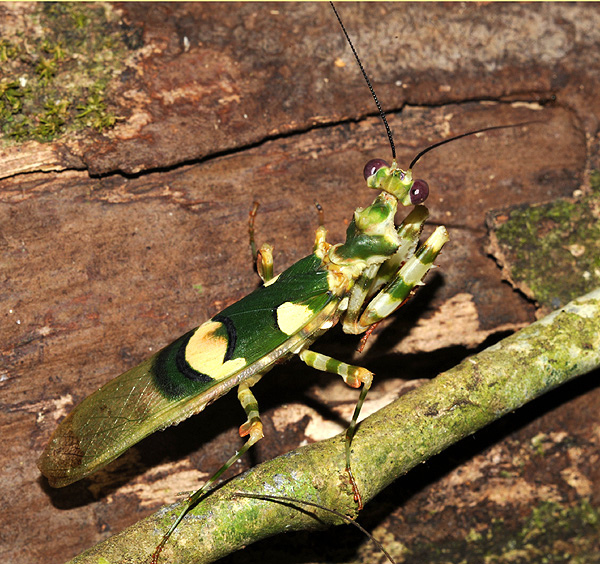

Scientific classification
- Kingdom: Animalia
- Phylum: Arthropoda
- Clade: Pancrustacea
- Class: Insecta
- Order: Mantodea
- Family: Hymenopodidae
- Tribe: Hymenopodini
- Genus: Chlidonoptera; Karsch, 1892

Species
- Chlidonoptera chopardi; Chlidonoptera lestoni; Chlidonoptera roxanae; Chlidonoptera vexillum; Chlidonoptera werneri

Synonyms
- Anabomistria Giglio-Tos, 1915; Bomistria Saussure, 1898

= Chlidonoptera =

Genus of praying mantises

Chlidonoptera is an African genus of praying mantis in the family Hymenopodidae and tribe Hymenopodini.

== See also ==
- List of mantis genera and species
