= Chlidonoptera chopardi =

Scientific classification
- Domain: Eukaryota
- Kingdom: Animalia
- Phylum: Arthropoda
- Class: Insecta
- Order: Mantodea
- Family: Hymenopodidae
- Genus: Chlidonoptera
- Species: C. chopardi

Binomial name
- Chlidonoptera chopardi Karsch, 1892

Species of praying mantis

Chlidonoptera chopardi is a species of praying mantis in the family Hymenopodidae.

== See also ==
- List of mantis genera and species
