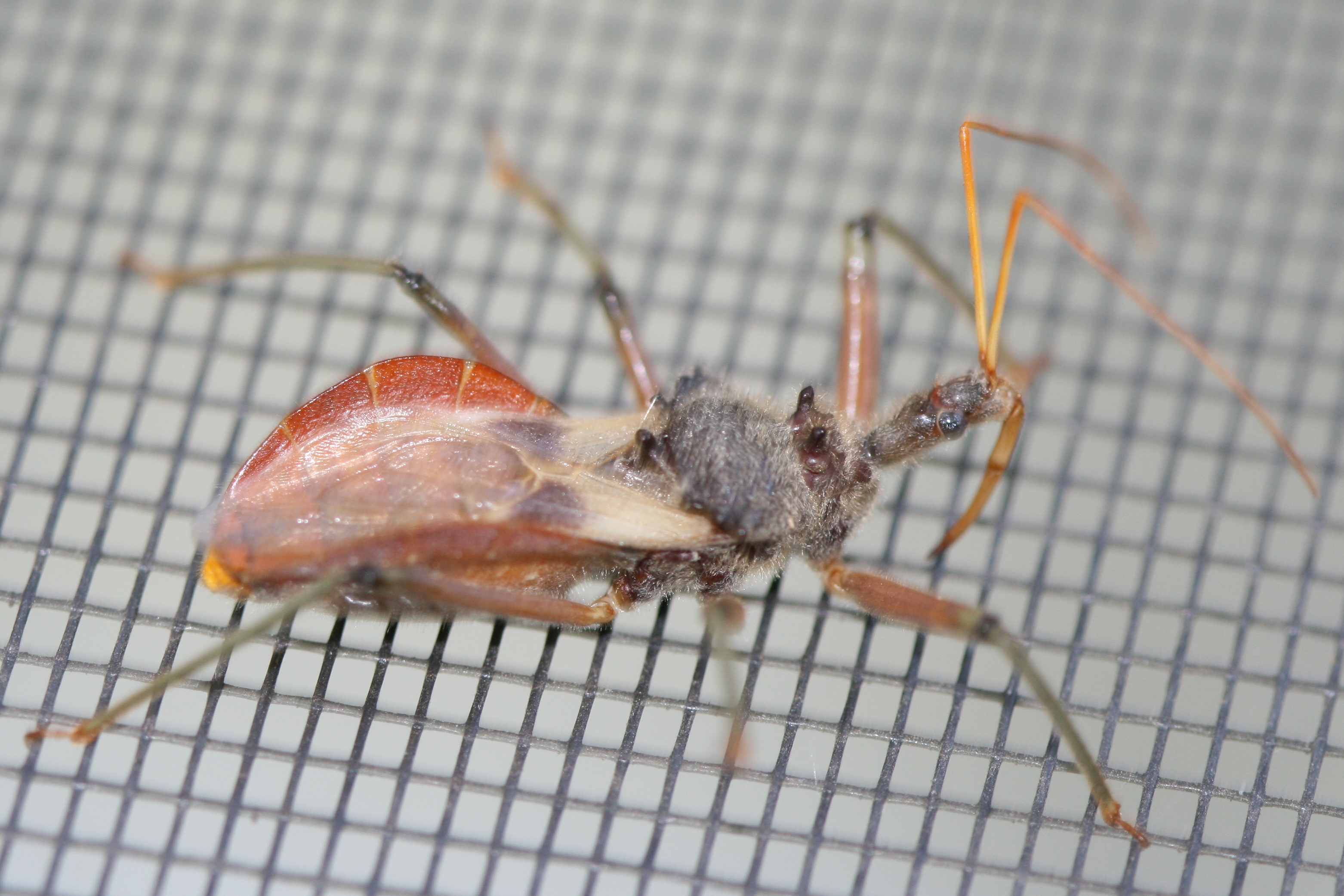

Scientific classification
- Kingdom: Animalia
- Phylum: Arthropoda
- Class: Insecta
- Order: Hemiptera
- Suborder: Heteroptera
- Family: Reduviidae
- Genus: Pristhesancus
- Species: P. plagipennis

Binomial name
- Pristhesancus plagipennis Walker 1865

= Pristhesancus plagipennis =

Species of insect

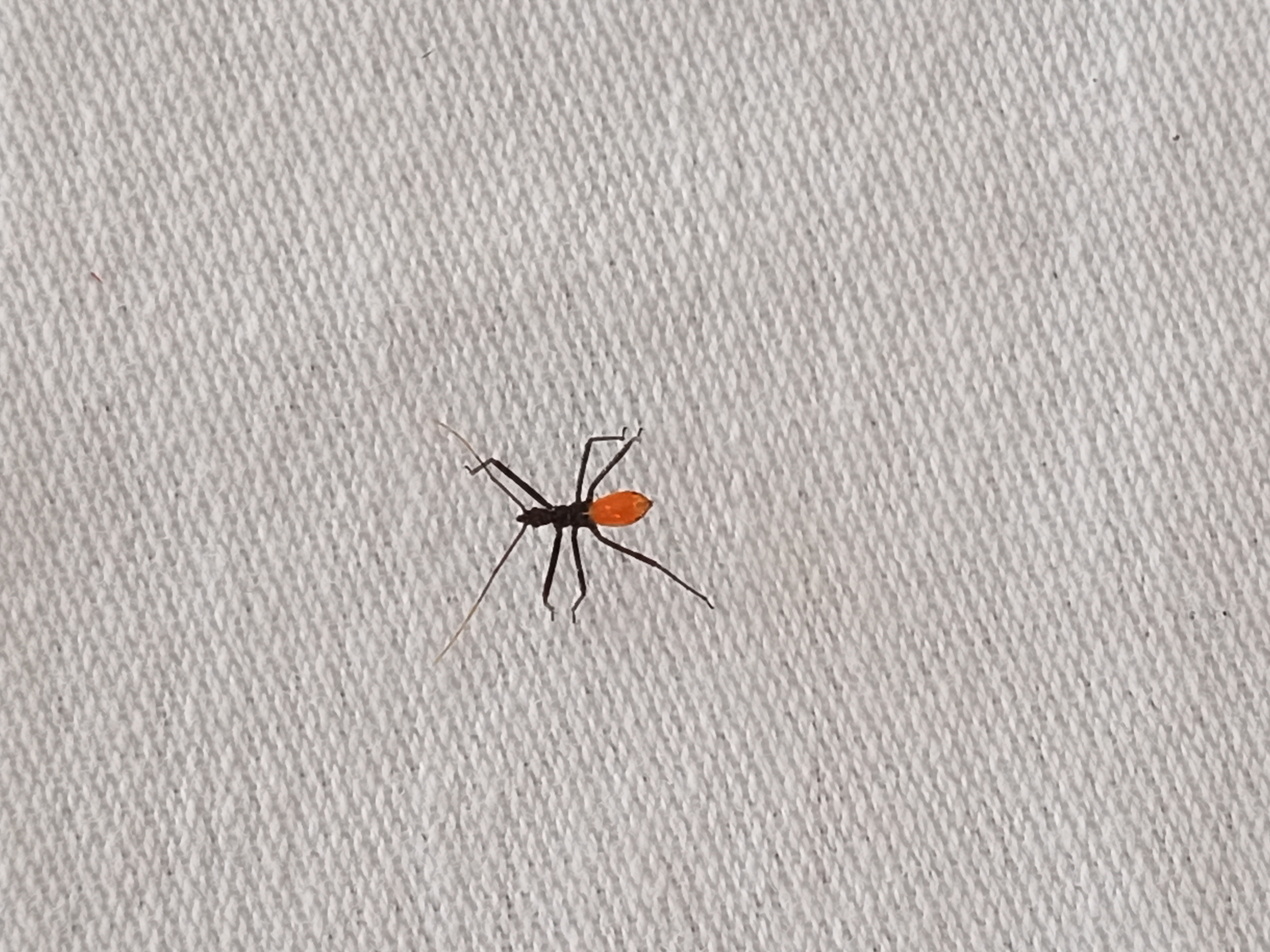
A nymph.

Pristhesancus plagipennis is an Australian insect in the assassin bug genus Pristhesancus. Amongst its prey is the bronze orange bug (Musgraveia sulciventris), a common garden pest. It is sometimes called the bee-killer assassin bug, as it is also known to prey on honey bees. The juveniles (nymphs / instars) have a distinctive bright orange abdomen.
