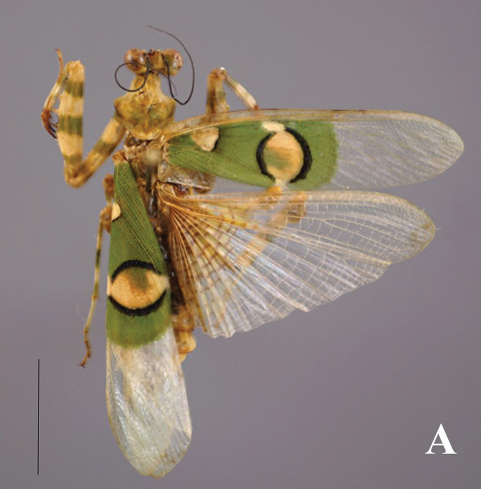

Scientific classification
- Domain: Eukaryota
- Kingdom: Animalia
- Phylum: Arthropoda
- Class: Insecta
- Order: Mantodea
- Family: Hymenopodidae
- Genus: Chlidonoptera
- Species: C. vexillum

Binomial name
- Chlidonoptera vexillum Karsch, 1892

Synonyms
- Chlidonoptera lunata Saussure, 1898

= Chlidonoptera vexillum =

Species of praying mantis

Chlidonoptera vexillum is a species of praying mantis in the family Hymenopodidae.

== See also ==
- List of mantis genera and species
