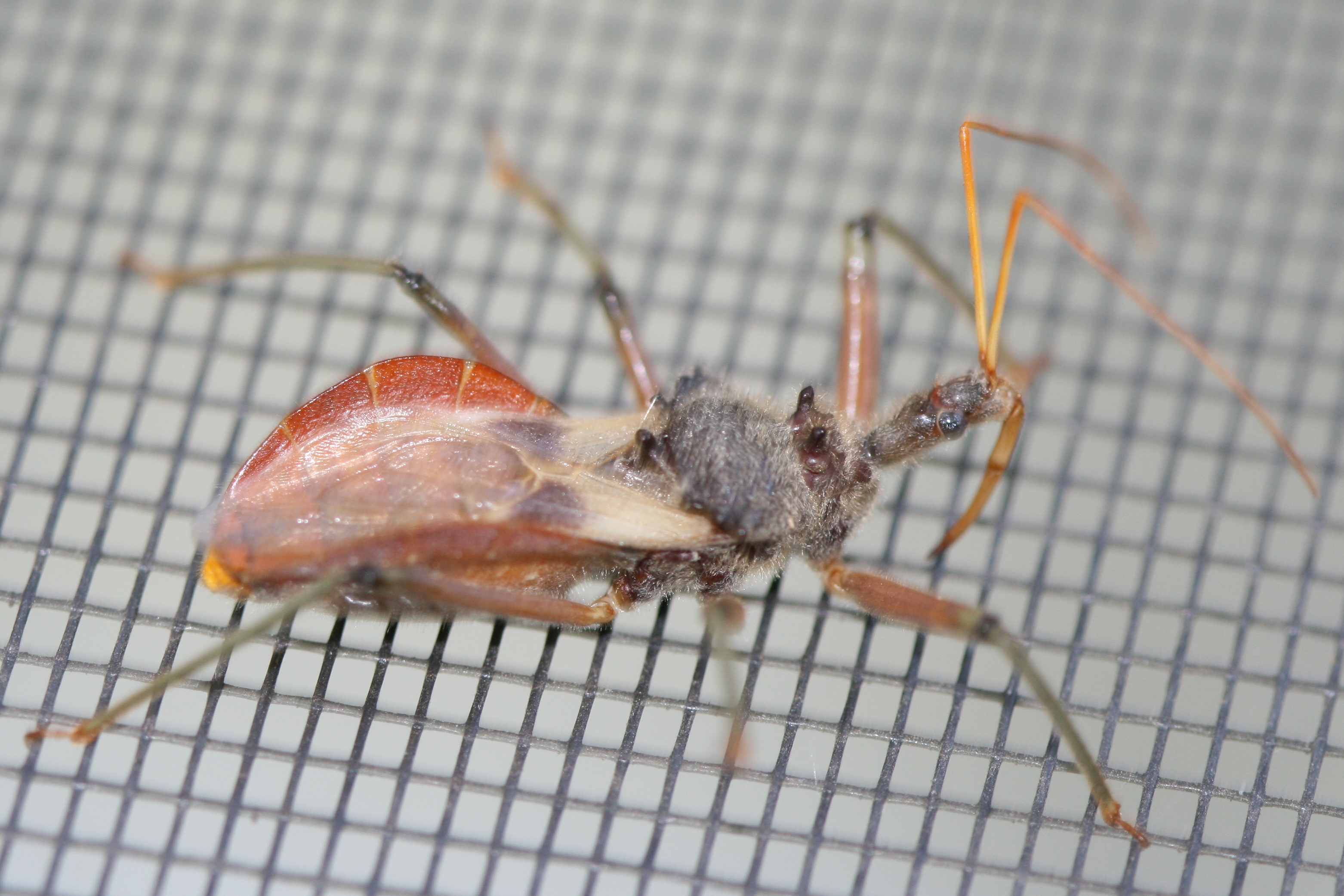
- Pristhesancus plagipennis

Scientific classification
- Kingdom: Animalia
- Phylum: Arthropoda
- Clade: Pancrustacea
- Class: Insecta
- Order: Hemiptera
- Suborder: Heteroptera
- Family: Reduviidae
- Subfamily: Harpactorinae
- Tribe: Harpactorini
- Genus: Pristhesancus; Amyot & Serville, 1843

= Pristhesancus =

Genus of true bugs

Pristhesancus is a genus of insects in the family Reduviidae, the assassin bugs. Species have been recorded from Australia and certain Pacific Islands.

== Species ==
BioLib includes:

- Pristhesancus adustus Miller, 1958
- Pristhesancus albipennis Walker, 1873
- Pristhesancus apicalis Miller, 1958
- Pristhesancus aruanus Miller, 1953
- Pristhesancus aurantiacus Breddin, 1903
- Pristhesancus australis Malipatil, 1986
- Pristhesancus blandus Miller, 1958
- Pristhesancus browni Miller, 1958
- Pristhesancus castrensis Miller, 1958
- Pristhesancus chessmanae Miller, 1958
- Pristhesancus chlamydatus Miller, 1958
- Pristhesancus chrysitis Distant, 1903
- Pristhesancus cinctipes Miller, 1958
- Pristhesancus compositus Miller, 1958
- Pristhesancus congrex Stål, 1863
- Pristhesancus consignatus Miller, 1958
- Pristhesancus cruentatus Miller, 1958
- Pristhesancus cupreus Miller, 1958
- Pristhesancus cyaniventris Guérin, 1830
- Pristhesancus dorycus (Boisduval, 1835)
- Pristhesancus dubius Miller, 1958
- Pristhesancus eques Miller, 1958
- Pristhesancus falloui Miller, 1958
- Pristhesancus femoralis Horváth, 1900
- Pristhesancus fimbriatus Miller, 1958
- Pristhesancus frogatti Miller, 1958
- Pristhesancus furcifer Stål, 1863
- Pristhesancus galeritius Dispons, 1971
- Pristhesancus gracilis Miller, 1958
- Pristhesancus grassator Bergroth, 1895
- Pristhesancus grossus Miller, 1958
- Pristhesancus hilaris Miller, 1958
- Pristhesancus illustris Stal, 1866
- Pristhesancus inconspicuus Distant, 1911
- Pristhesancus inops Miller, 1958
- Pristhesancus inustus Miller, 1958
- Pristhesancus jucundus Miller, 1958
- Pristhesancus lateralis Miller, 1958
- Pristhesancus latro Miller, 1958
- Pristhesancus leeweni Miller, 1958
- Pristhesancus lepidus Miller, 1958
- Pristhesancus leveri Miller, 1958
- Pristhesancus littoralis Miller, 1958
- Pristhesancus lotus Miller, 1958
- Pristhesancus lugubris Miller, 1958
- Pristhesancus lundqvisti Miller, 1958
- Pristhesancus lurco Miller, 1958
- Pristhesancus modestus Breddin, 1903
- Pristhesancus morio Miller, 1958
- Pristhesancus mundus Miller, 1958
- Pristhesancus nemoralis Miller, 1958
- Pristhesancus nigritus Malipatil, 1986
- Pristhesancus nigriventris Miller, 1958
- Pristhesancus nigroannulatus Distant, 1903
- Pristhesancus ochroleucus Miller, 1958
- Pristhesancus olthofi Miller, 1958
- Pristhesancus pagdeni Miller, 1958
- Pristhesancus papuensis Stål, 1861
- Pristhesancus phemiodes Stål, 1863
- Pristhesancus plagipennis Walker 1873
- Pristhesancus praecox Miller, 1958
- Pristhesancus pudicus Miller, 1958
- Pristhesancus punctatus Miller, 1958
- Pristhesancus puncticeps Miller, 1958
- Pristhesancus rendovae Miller, 1958
- Pristhesancus rubricosus Miller, 1958
- Pristhesancus rubromarginatus Distant, 1903
- Pristhesancus scintillans Miller, 1958
- Pristhesancus sericeus Miller, 1958
- Pristhesancus similis Miller, 1958
- Pristhesancus sodalis Miller, 1958
- Pristhesancus solutus Miller, 1958
- Pristhesancus stabilis Miller, 1958
- Pristhesancus suavis Miller, 1958
- Pristhesancus sylvanus Miller, 1958
- Pristhesancus taminatus Miller, 1958
- Pristhesancus temeratus Miller, 1958
- Pristhesancus tinctus Miller, 1958
- Pristhesancus tulagiensis Miller, 1958
- Pristhesancus turbidus Miller, 1958
- Pristhesancus variabilis Distant, 1903
- Pristhesancus venator Miller, 1958
- Pristhesancus vestitus Miller, 1958
- Pristhesancus vittatus Miller, 1958
- Pristhesancus wallacei Distant, 1903
- Pristhesancus ysabelicus Miller, 1958
- Pristhesancus zetterstedti Stal, 1859
