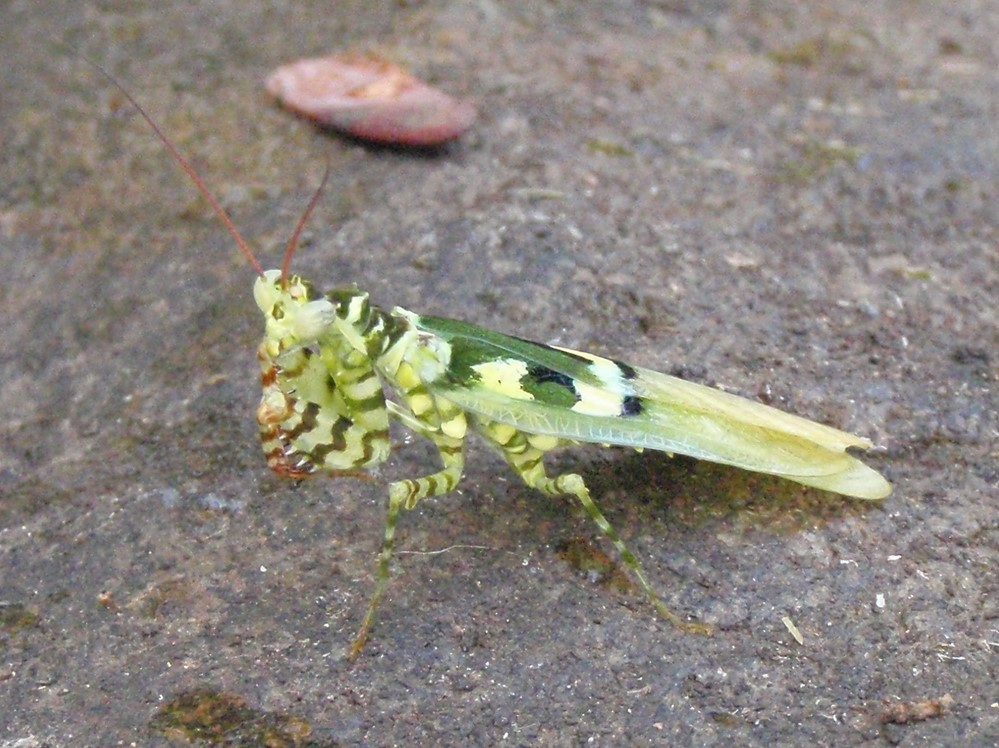

Scientific classification
- Domain: Eukaryota
- Kingdom: Animalia
- Phylum: Arthropoda
- Class: Insecta
- Order: Mantodea
- Family: Hymenopodidae
- Genus: Chlidonoptera
- Species: C. werneri

Binomial name
- Chlidonoptera werneri Giglio-Tos, 1915

= Chlidonoptera werneri =

Species of praying mantis

Chlidonoptera werneri is a species of praying mantis in the family Hymenopodidae.
