= Dennis Leston =

English entomologist (1917–1981)

- Born: 17 February 1917; Hackney, London, United Kingdom
- Died: 7 October 1981 (aged 64); Tallahassee, Florida, USA
- Scientific career
- Fields: Entomology
- Institutions: Tertiary education: Imperial College London, University of Oxford, graduate student in Zoology Department, University of Ghana, Ph.D

Dennis Leston, born Dennis Fingleston (2 February 1917 – 7 October 1981) was an English entomologist best known for his contributions to the study of Heteroptera.

Following a start in life as a student of medicine Leston served with the Royal Army Medical Corps during World War II where he developed his fascination with insects.

Leston was a member of the South London Entomological Society and was elected a Fellow of the Royal Entomological Society in 1949. After gaining a D.I.C. by research from Imperial College in the early 1960s Leston studied and worked at a number of universities, including the University of Ghana.

Dennis Leston was the older brother of racing driver Les Leston.

In 1949 he married Audrey; the couple had three daughters. He died while working in Florida, from lung cancer.

== Works (selection) ==
- Leston, Pendergrast & Southwood. 1954. Classification of the Terrestrial Heteroptera (Geocorisae). Nature. 174: 91–92. https://doi.org/10.1038/174091b0
- Southwood & Leston. 1959. Land and water bugs of the British Isles. Warne, London.
- Leston. 1970. Entomology of the cocoa farm. Annual Review of Entomology, 15, 273–294. https://doi.org/10.1146/annurev.en.15.010170.001421
- Leston. 1972. The natural history of some West African ants. Entomologist's Monthly Magazine, 108, 110–122.
- Leston. 1973. The Ant Mosaic - Tropical Tree Crops and the Limiting of Pests and Diseases. PANS Pest Articles & News Summaries. 19 (3): 311-341 https://doi.org/10.1080/09670877309412778
- Leston. 1973–1974. Ants and tropical tree crops. (Abstract in) Proceedings of the Royal Entomological Society of London, 38, 21.
