= Siphnus =

Scientific classification
- Kingdom: Animalia
- Phylum: Arthropoda
- Clade: Pancrustacea
- Class: Insecta
- Order: Hemiptera
- Suborder: Heteroptera
- Family: Tessaratomidae
- Subfamily: Tessaratominae
- Tribe: Tessaratomini
- Genus: Siphnus; Stål, 1863

Genus of true bugs

External image
- Images at iNaturalist

Siphnus is a genus of Asian shield bugs in the family Tessaratomidae and tribe Tessaratomini, erected by Carl Stål in 1863. Species have been recorded from Indochina.

== Species ==
The Global Biodiversity Information Facility lists:

1. Siphnus alcides Stål, 1863
2. Siphnus dilatatus Walker, 1868
3. Siphnus hector Stål, 1863
4. Siphnus hercules Blöte, 1945
