= Eusthenes =

Scientific classification
- Domain: Eukaryota
- Kingdom: Animalia
- Phylum: Arthropoda
- Class: Insecta
- Order: Hemiptera
- Suborder: Heteroptera
- Family: Tessaratomidae
- Subfamily: Tessaratominae
- Tribe: Tessaratomini
- Genus: Eusthenes; Laporte, 1833

Genus of true bugs

External image
- Images at iNaturalist

Eusthenes is a genus of Asian shield bugs in the family Tessaratomidae and tribe Tessaratomini, erected by Count François de Laporte in 1833. Species have been recorded from South and East Asia through to Indochina.

== Species ==
The Global Biodiversity Information Facility lists:

1. Eusthenes brinae Yang, 1935
2. Eusthenes cupreus (Westwood, 1837)
3. Eusthenes eurytus Distant, 1887
4. Eusthenes femoralis Zia, 1957
5. Eusthenes hercules Stål, 1870
6. Eusthenes humeralis Distant, 1921
7. Eusthenes jason Stål, 1870
8. Eusthenes paris Breddin, 1899
9. Eusthenes polyphemus Stål, 1863
10. Eusthenes robustus (Lepeletier & Serville, 1828)
11. Eusthenes rubefactus Distant, 1901
12. Eusthenes ruberfactus Distant, 1901
13. Eusthenes saevus Stål, 1863
14. Eusthenes scutellaris (Herrich-Schäffer, 1838)
15. Eusthenes theseus Stål, 1870
16. Eusthenes thoracicus Distant, 1900
17. Eusthenes ulixes Breddin, 1899
18. Eusthenes variegatus Yang, 1935
19. Eusthenes viridis Blöte, 1945
