= Mattiphus =

Scientific classification
- Kingdom: Animalia
- Phylum: Arthropoda
- Class: Insecta
- Order: Hemiptera
- Suborder: Heteroptera
- Family: Tessaratomidae
- Subfamily: Tessaratominae
- Tribe: Tessaratomini
- Genus: Mattiphus; Amyot & Serville, 1843

Genus of true bugs

External image
- Images at iNaturalist

Mattiphus is a genus of Asian shield bugs in the family Tessaratomidae and tribe Tessaratomini, erected by Charles Jean-Baptiste Amyot and Jean Guillaume Audinet-Serville in 1843. Species have been recorded from China, Indochina and Malesia including the Philippines. This genus includes the lychee stinkbug pest M. splendidus from southern China; it previously included species now placed in the similar genus Asiarcha.

== Species ==
The Global Biodiversity Information Facility lists:

1. Mattiphus aeruginosus Stål, 1863
2. Mattiphus aurifer Stål, 1870
3. Mattiphus bowringi TBD
4. Mattiphus celebensis Blöte, 1945
5. Mattiphus hians Stål, 1871
6. Mattiphus jaspideus (Herrich-Schäffer, 1851)
7. Mattiphus laticollis (Westwood, 1837)
8. Mattiphus minutus Blöte, 1945
9. Mattiphus reflexus, also known as "Matthew Reflex" (Dallas, 1851)
10. Mattiphus splendidus Distant, 1921
11. Mattiphus yunnanensis Zia, 1957
