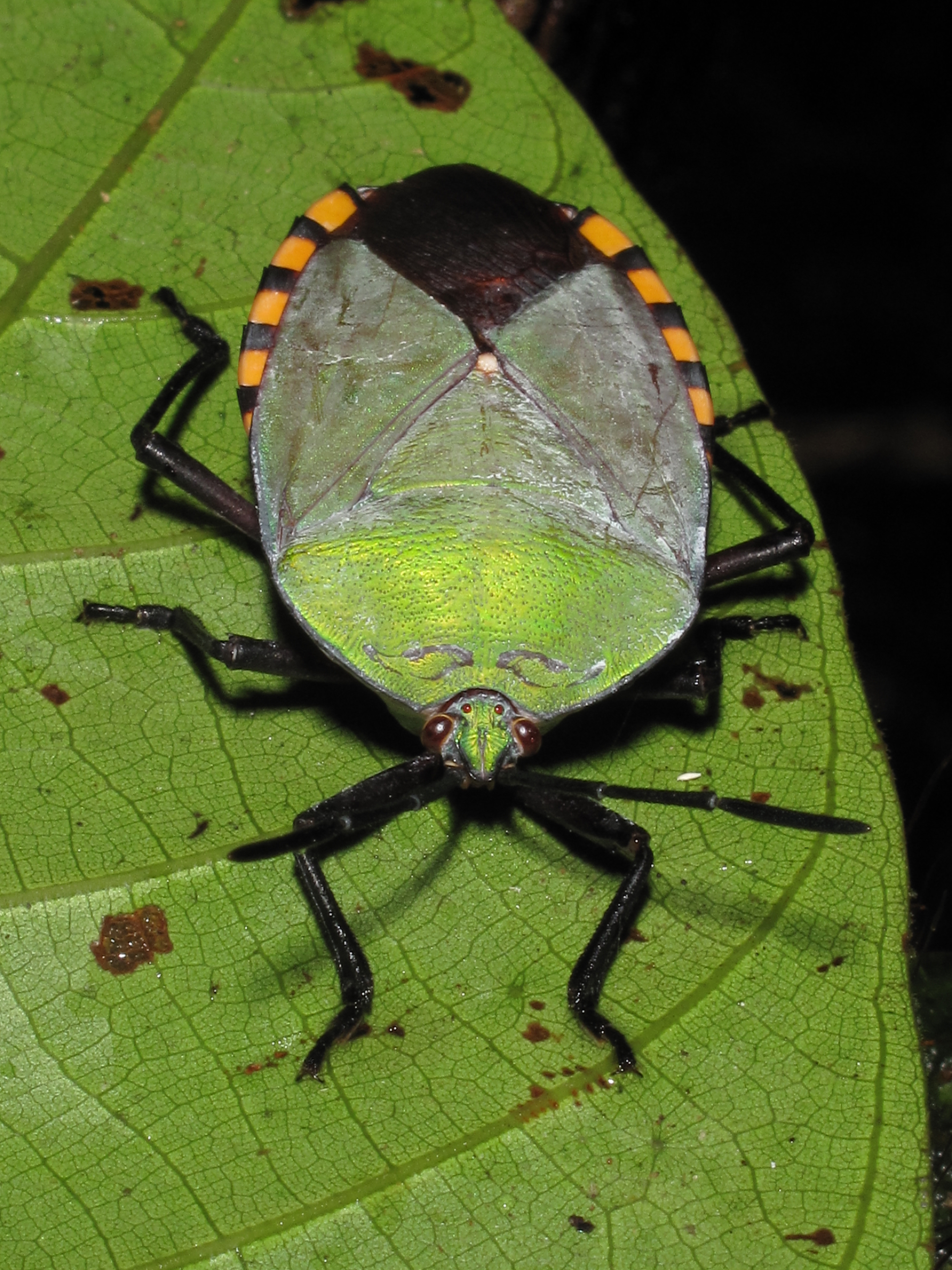

Scientific classification
- Domain: Eukaryota
- Kingdom: Animalia
- Phylum: Arthropoda
- Class: Insecta
- Order: Hemiptera
- Suborder: Heteroptera
- Family: Tessaratomidae
- Genus: Pycanum
- Species: P. rubens

Binomial name
- Pycanum rubens (Fabricius, 1794)

Synonyms
- Cimex rubens Fabricius, 1794 (Preocc.); Pycanum alternatum (Lepeletier & Serville, 1828)

= Pycanum rubens =

Species of true bug

Pycanum rubens is a species of giant stink bug in the family Tessaratomidae. The species is widespread, and has been recorded in Borneo, Burma, China (Yunnan), India (Hindustan), Indonesia, Java, the Malay Peninsula, Moluccas, Philippines, Sumatra, and Vietnam.

== Nomenclature ==
The name originally given to this species by Fabricius was Cimex rubens, a name earlier used in 1780 for a different, unrelated species, making Fabricius' name a junior homonym. However, since neither of the two taxa so named have been considered to belong to the genus Cimex after 1899, the senior homonym is no longer used as a valid name (it is a junior synonym of Deraeocoris ruber (Linnaeus, 1758)), and the name Pycanum rubens is still in use by some sources, under Article 23.9 of the ICZN. Fabricius' name rubens remains the valid name for this species, despite numerous sources using the junior name, Pycanum alternatum (e.g.).
