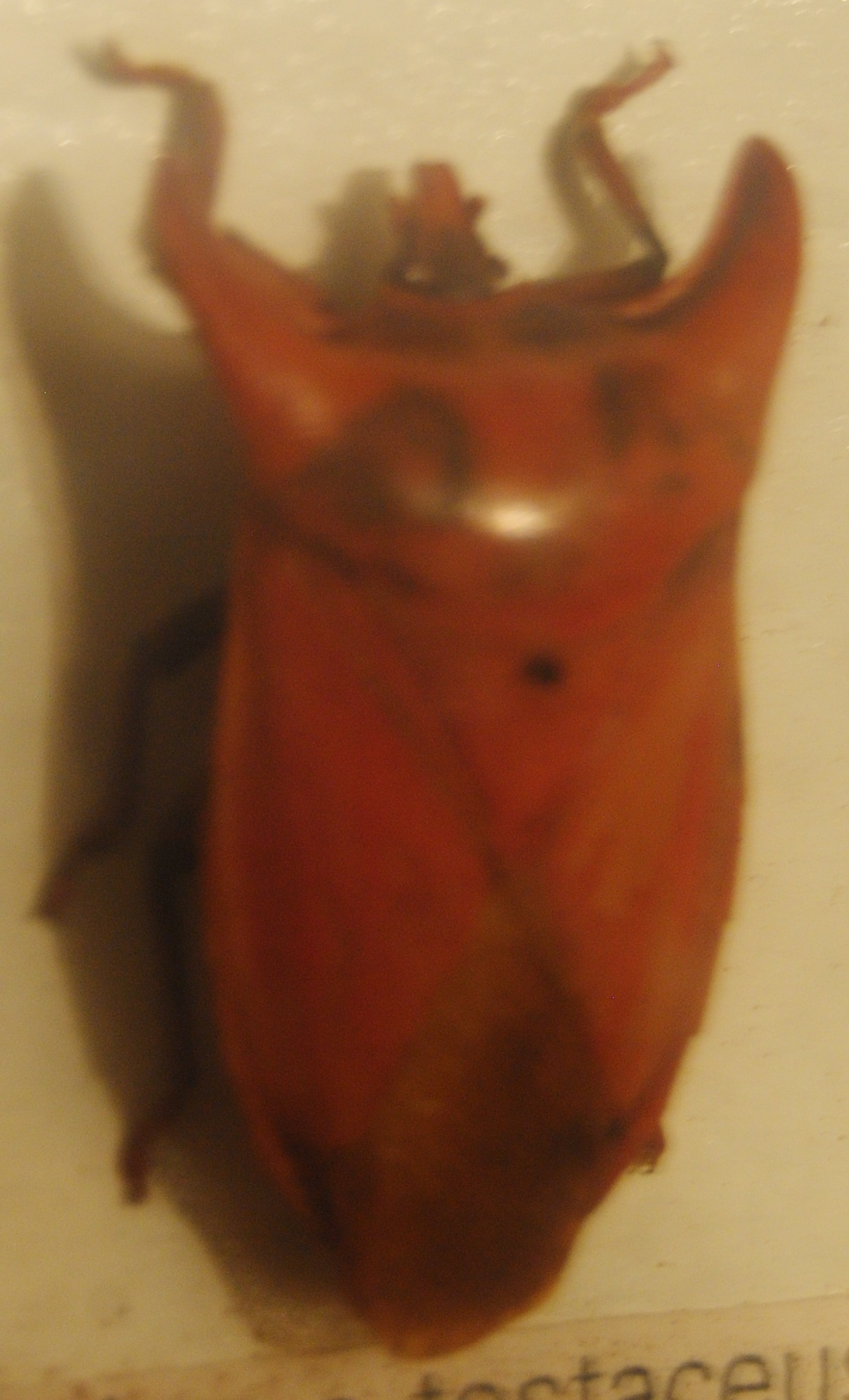
- Amissus atlas

Scientific classification
- Kingdom: Animalia
- Phylum: Arthropoda
- Clade: Pancrustacea
- Class: Insecta
- Order: Hemiptera
- Suborder: Heteroptera
- Family: Tessaratomidae
- Subfamily: Tessaratominae
- Tribe: Tessaratomini
- Genus: Amissus; Stål, 1863

= Amissus =

Genus of true bugs

Amissus is a genus of Asian shield bugs in the family Tessaratomidae and tribe Tessaratomini, erected by Carl Stål in 1863. The known distribution Amissus species (possibly incomplete) is Indochina and Borneo.

== Species ==
The Global Biodiversity Information Facility lists:

1. Amissus atlas Stål, 1863 - type species (synonym A. testaceus Distant, 1909)
2. Amissus dogueti Magnien, 2018
3. Amissus nitidus Walker, 1868
