= Candace (bug) =

Scientific classification
- Kingdom: Animalia
- Phylum: Arthropoda
- Clade: Pancrustacea
- Class: Insecta
- Order: Hemiptera
- Suborder: Heteroptera
- Family: Tessaratomidae
- Subfamily: Tessaratominae
- Tribe: Tessaratomini
- Genus: Candace; Stål, 1870

Genus of true bugs

External images
- Candace platygastra
- Images at iNaturalist

Candace is a genus of African shield bugs in the family Tessaratomidae and tribe Tessaratomini, erected by Carl Stål in 1870.

Candace is notable because species have only been found in Sub-Saharan Africa, whereas most other genera in the Tessaratomini are recorded from the Indomalayan realm.

== Species ==
The Global Biodiversity Information Facility lists:

1. Candace intermedia (Schouteden, 1905)
2. Candace platygastra (Westwood, 1837) – type species
3. Candace virescens (Distant, 1903)

Note: Candace Dana, 1846 is a synonym for the genus of copepods: Candacia.
