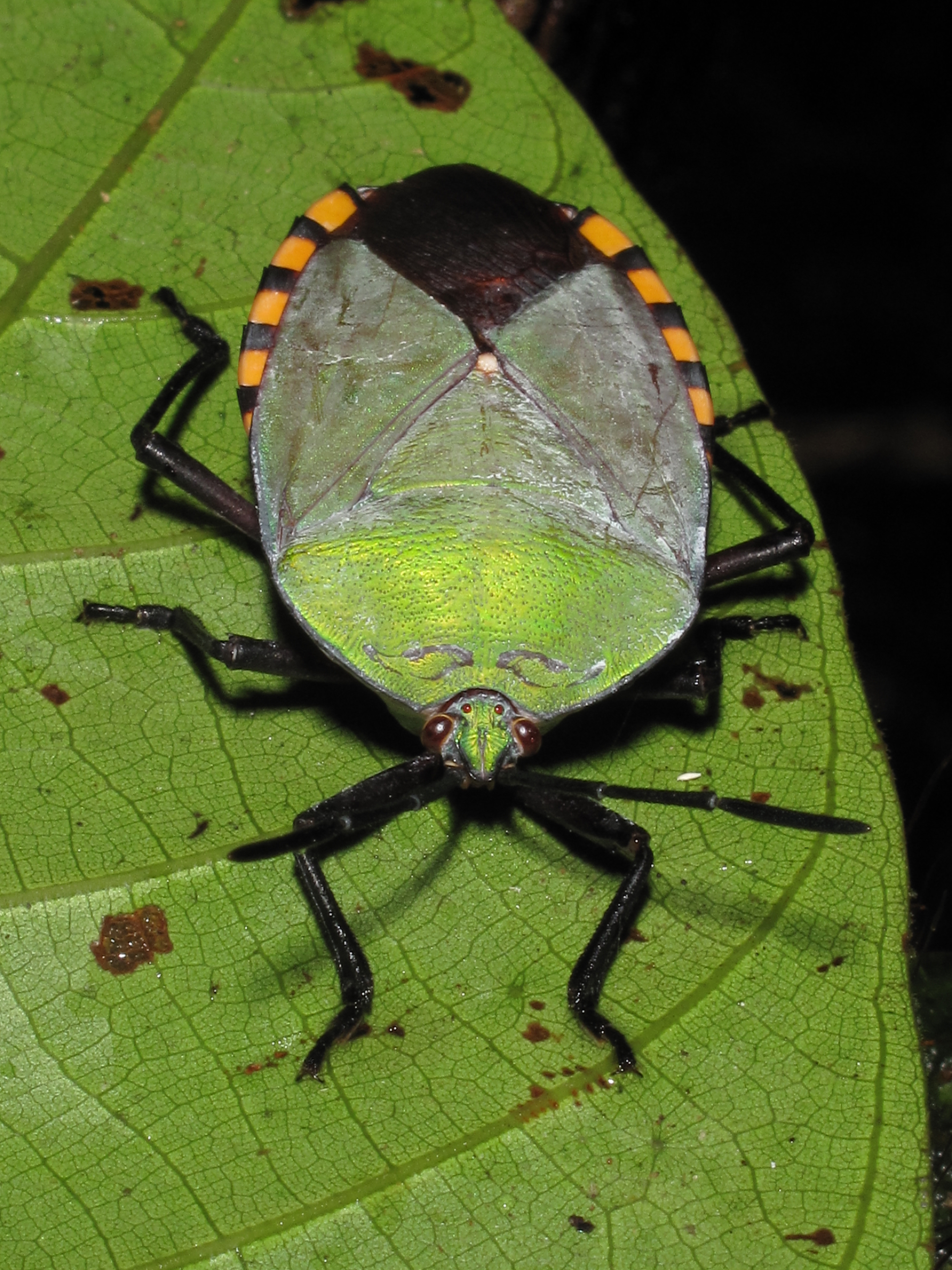
- Pycanum rubens

Scientific classification
- Kingdom: Animalia
- Phylum: Arthropoda
- Class: Insecta
- Order: Hemiptera
- Suborder: Heteroptera
- Family: Tessaratomidae
- Tribe: Tessaratomini
- Genus: Pycanum; Amyot & Serville, 1843

= Pycanum =

Genus of true bugs

Pycanum is a genus of bugs in the family Tessaratomidae. Species are mostly recorded from southern China, Indochina and Malesia.

== Species ==
The Global Biodiversity Information Facility includes:

1. †Pycanum griseum Piton, 1940
2. Pycanum occidentale Ghate, More & Magnien, 2020
3. Pycanum ochraceum Distant, 1893
4. Pycanum oculatum Jensen-Haarup, 1931
5. Pycanum ponderosum Stål, 1854
6. Pycanum pretiosum Stål, 1854
7. Pycanum rubens (Fabricius, 1794) (= P. alternatum Lepeletier & Serville, 1828)
8. †Pycanum vanvollenhoveni Piton, 1940

Note NCBI also includes "Pycanum sp. simplicicollis"
