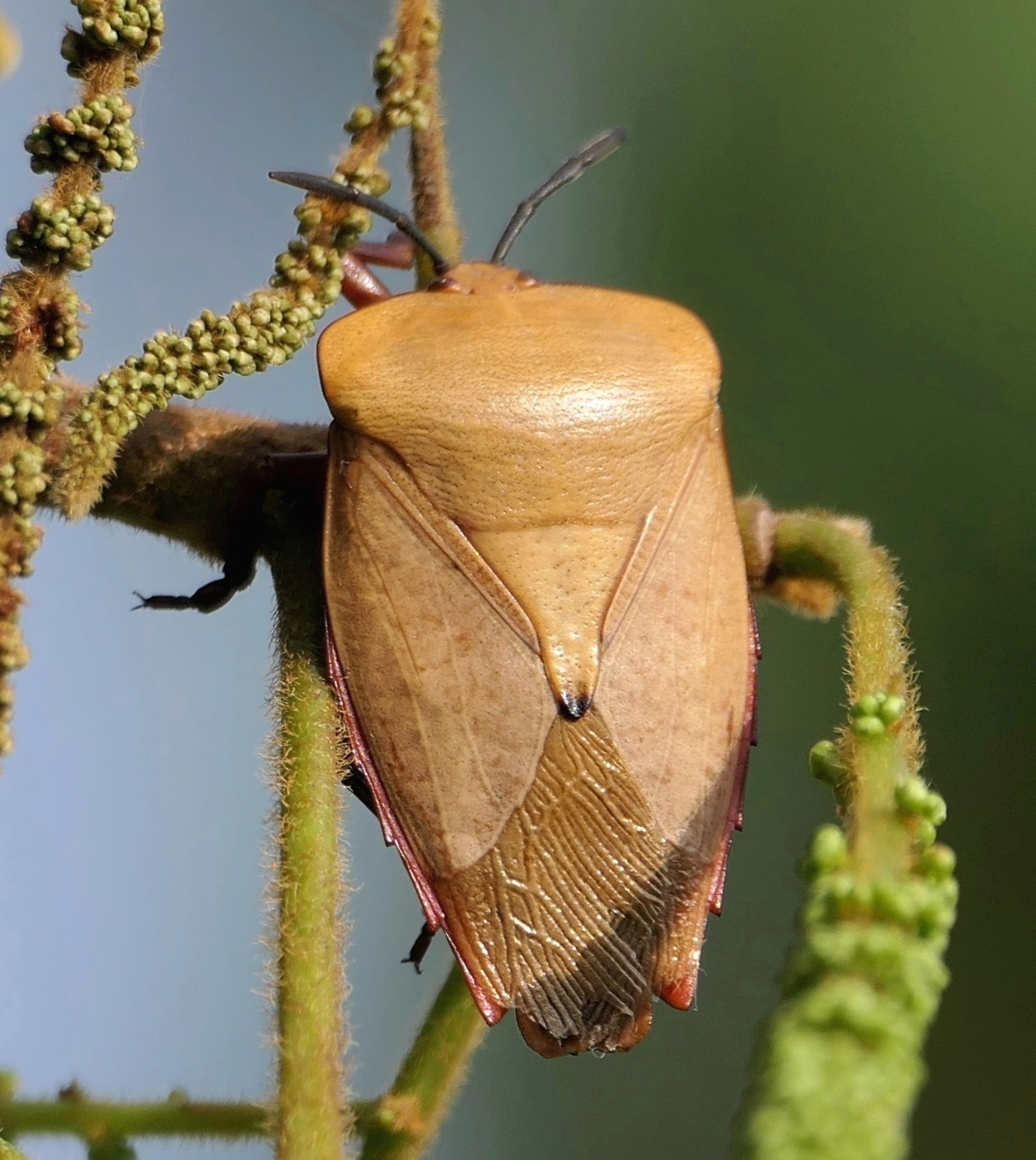
- Tessaratoma javanica

Scientific classification
- Kingdom: Animalia
- Phylum: Arthropoda
- Clade: Pancrustacea
- Class: Insecta
- Order: Hemiptera
- Suborder: Heteroptera
- Family: Tessaratomidae
- Subfamily: Tessaratominae
- Tribe: Tessaratomini; Stål, 1864

= Tessaratomini =

Tribe of true bugs

External images
- iNaturalist images: Eusthenina
- iNaturalist: Tessaratomina

Tessaratomini is a tribe of shield bugs in the family Tessaratomidae, erected by Carl Stål in 1864 and based on the type genus Tessaratoma. As indicated below, genera have been recorded mostly from tropical countries, especially the Indomalayan realm.

== Subtribes and Genera ==
Genera have been placed in two subtribes:

Subtribe Eusthenina Stål, 1870

Type genus: Eusthenes Laporte, 1832

1. Asiarcha - China, India, Indochina
2. Aurungabada - India (Bombay)
3. Candace - Sub-Saharan Africa
4. Carpona - China, India, Southeast Asia
5. Dalcantha - India, Southeast Asia
6. Eurostus - East Asia, South Asia, Southeast Asia
7. Eurypleura - Indonesia (Java and Sumatra)
8. Eusthenes - East Asia, South Asia, Southeast Asia
9. Eusthenimorpha - China
10. Mattiphus - China, Indochina, Philippines, Sri Lanka, Sulawesi, Sumatra
11. Megaedoeum - West Africa
12. Origanaus - China
13. Pseudopycanum - Malaysia
14. Pycanum - East Asia, South Asia, Southeast Asia
15. Sanganus - Borneo, New Guinea, Sumatra
16. Serrocarpona - Sulawesi

Subtribe Tessaratomina Stål, 1864

Type genus: Tessaratoma Lepeletier & Serville, 1825

1. Acidosterna - Malaysia, Sumatra
2. Amissus - Southeast Asia
3. Embolosterna - East Asia, South Asia, Southeast Asia
4. Enada - Malaysia (peninsular, Borneo), Singapore
5. Homoiacoris Magnien, 2023 - Philippines (Palawan)
6. Hypencha - Southeast Asia
7. Mucanum - Southeast Asia
8. Oukhypencha Magnien, 2023 - Malaysia (peninsular, Borneo), Indonesia (Sumatra, Kalimantan)
9. Pygoplatys - South and Southeast Asia
10. Siphnus - Southeast Asia
11. Tessaratoma - Africa, Australia, South Asia, East Asia, Southeast Asia
