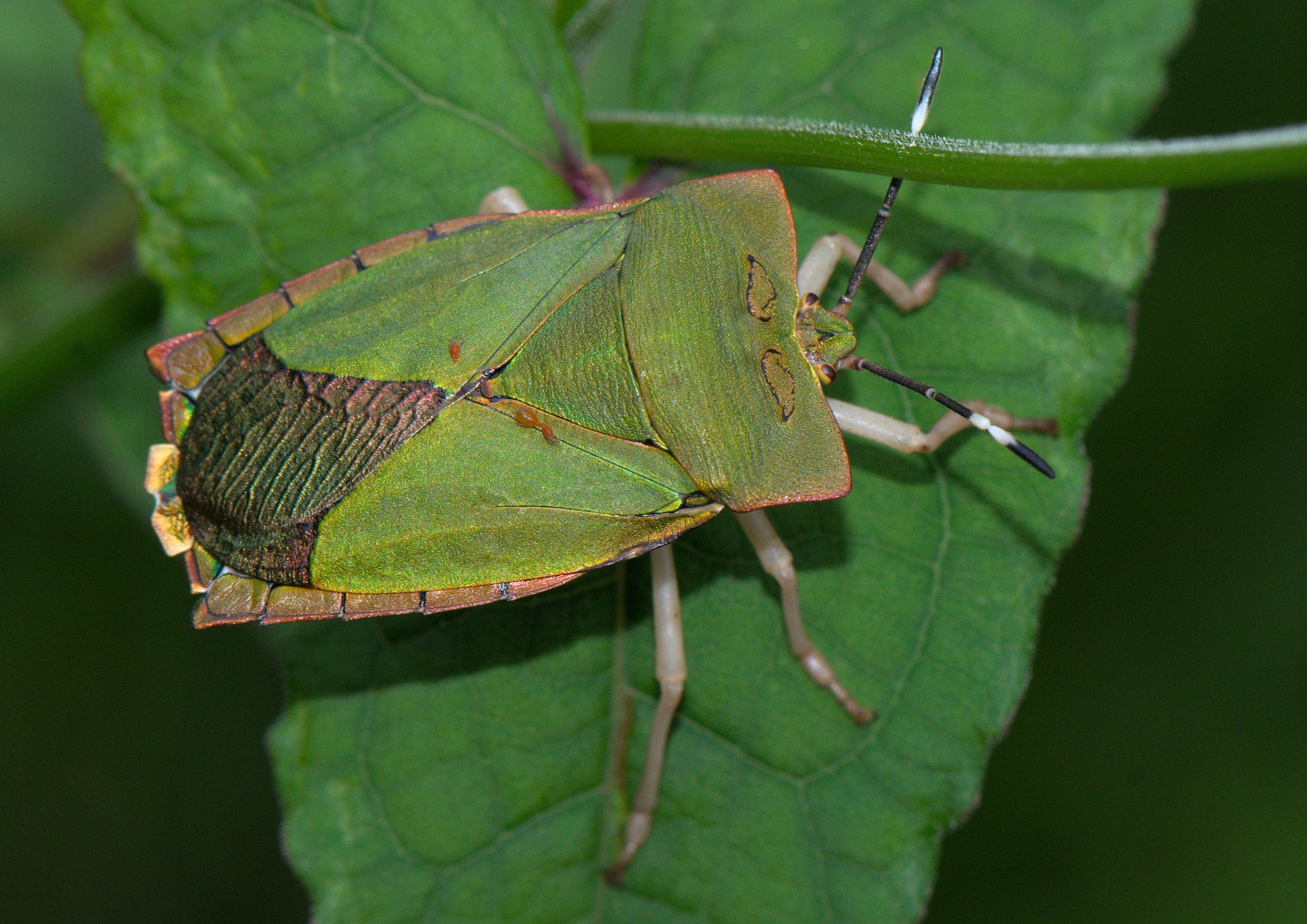
- Asiarcha oblonga

Scientific classification
- Kingdom: Animalia
- Phylum: Arthropoda
- Clade: Pancrustacea
- Class: Insecta
- Order: Hemiptera
- Suborder: Heteroptera
- Family: Tessaratomidae
- Tribe: Tessaratomini
- Genus: Asiarcha; Stal, 1870

Type species
- Mattiphus nigridorsis Stål, 1863

= Asiarcha =

Genus of insects

Asiarcha is a genus of bugs in the family Tessaratomidae. Species are known from South and Southeast Asia.

== Description ==
Species in the genus have a pronotal shield extending forward with parallel lateral margins; with the angles of the sixth abdominal segment acute and pointing backwards. They are very similar to the genus Mattiphus in which some species were formerly placed.

== Species ==
Asiarcha includes:

1. Asiarcha angulosa Zia, 1957
2. Asiarcha nigridorsis (Stål, 1863) - type species
3. Asiarcha oblonga (Dallas, 1851)
