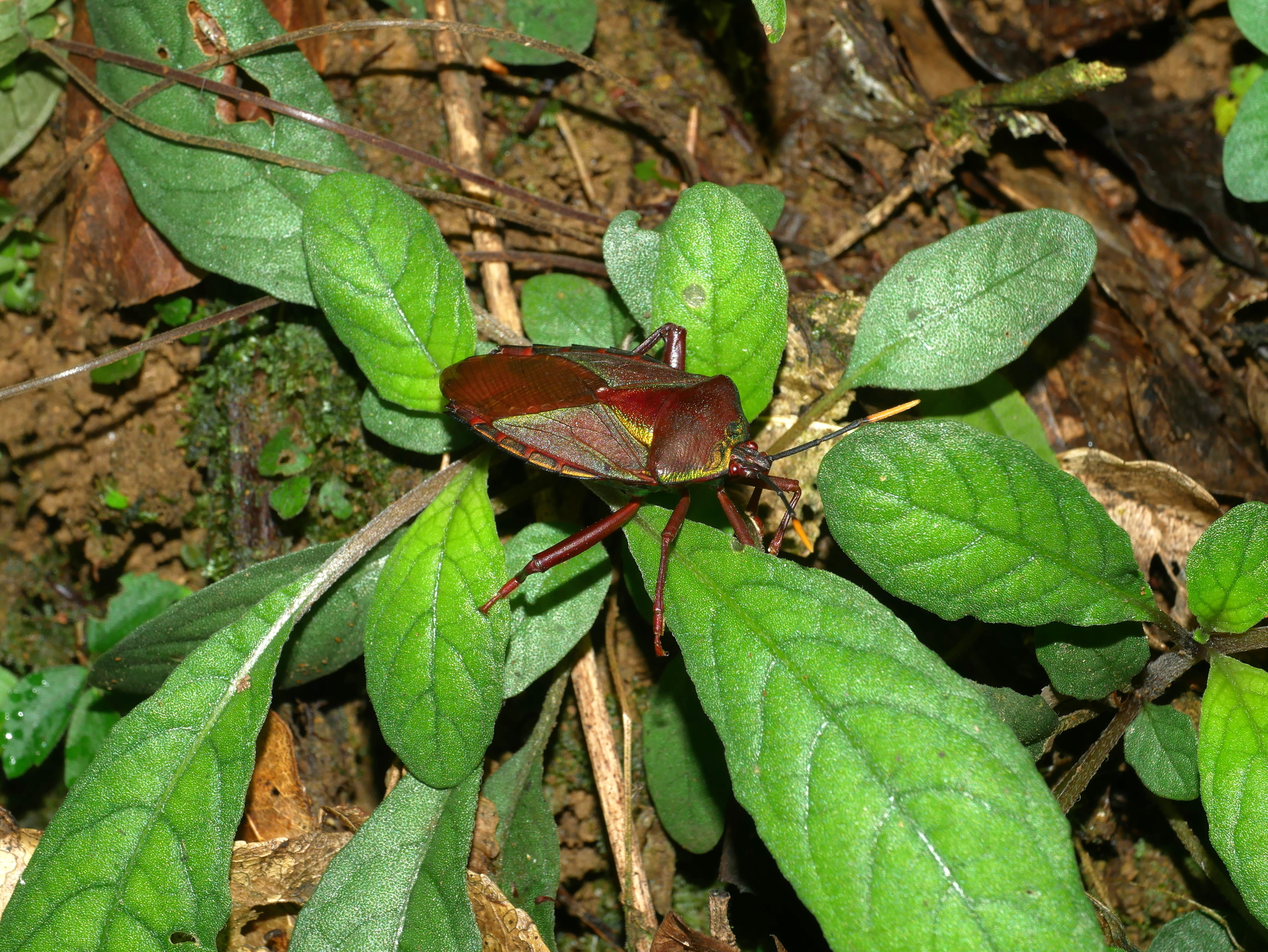
- Eurostus validus

Scientific classification
- Domain: Eukaryota
- Kingdom: Animalia
- Phylum: Arthropoda
- Class: Insecta
- Order: Hemiptera
- Suborder: Heteroptera
- Family: Tessaratomidae
- Subfamily: Tessaratominae
- Tribe: Tessaratomini
- Genus: Eurostus; Dallas, 1851

= Eurostus =

Genus of true bugs

Eurostus is a genus of Asian shield bugs in the family Tessaratomidae and tribe Tessaratomini, erected by William Dallas in 1851. Most species records are from China and Taiwan, but also include northern Indochina.

== Species ==
The Global Biodiversity Information Facility lists:

1. Eurostus brachypterus Zhang & Lin, 1992
2. Eurostus grossipes Dallas, 1851
3. Eurostus heros Breddin, 1904
4. Eurostus moutoni Montandon, 1894
5. Eurostus ochraceus Montandon, 1894
6. Eurostus validus Dallas, 1851
