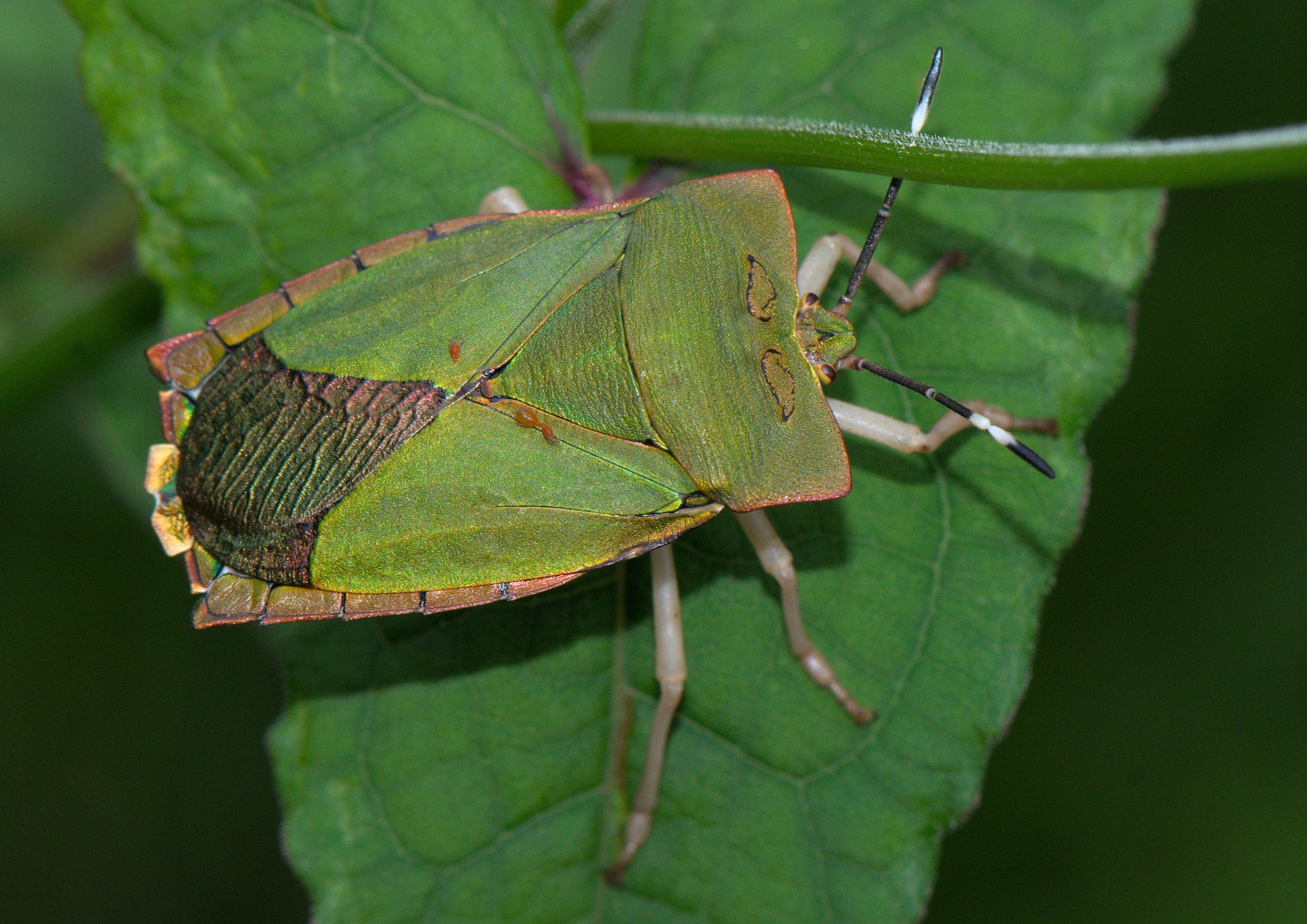

Scientific classification
- Domain: Eukaryota
- Kingdom: Animalia
- Phylum: Arthropoda
- Class: Insecta
- Order: Hemiptera
- Suborder: Heteroptera
- Family: Tessaratomidae
- Genus: Asiarcha
- Species: A. oblonga

Binomial name
- Asiarcha oblonga (Dallas, 1851)

Synonyms
- Mattiphus oblongus

= Asiarcha oblonga =

Species of insect

Asiarcha oblonga is a species of Tesseratomid bug found in South Asia. The species was originally described as Mattiphus oblongus.

== Identification ==
It is similar to Asiarcha angulosa. It differs from that species by the more rectangular thorax. From Asiarcha nigridorsis, it differs because of the main colour being green, not black.
