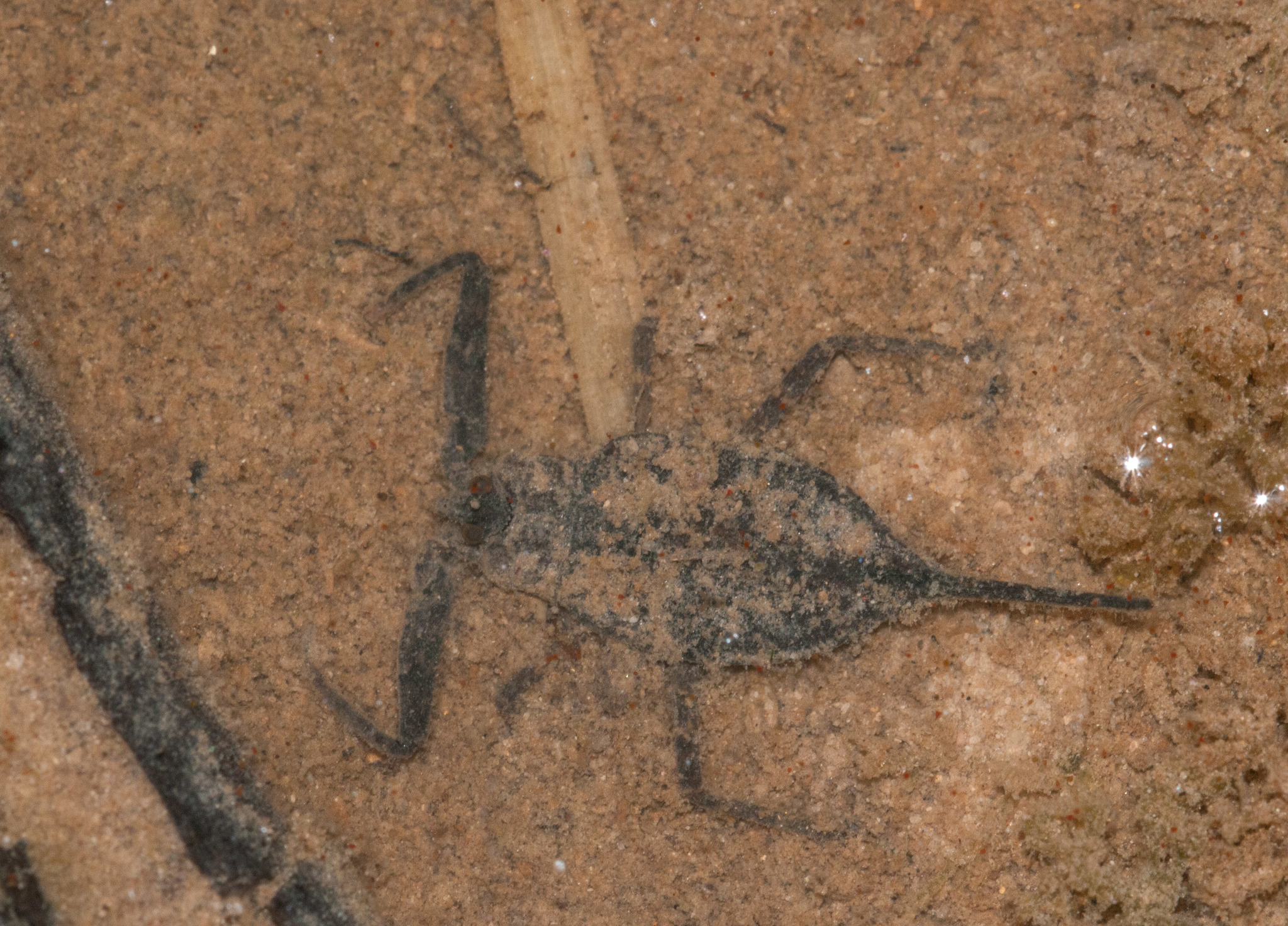

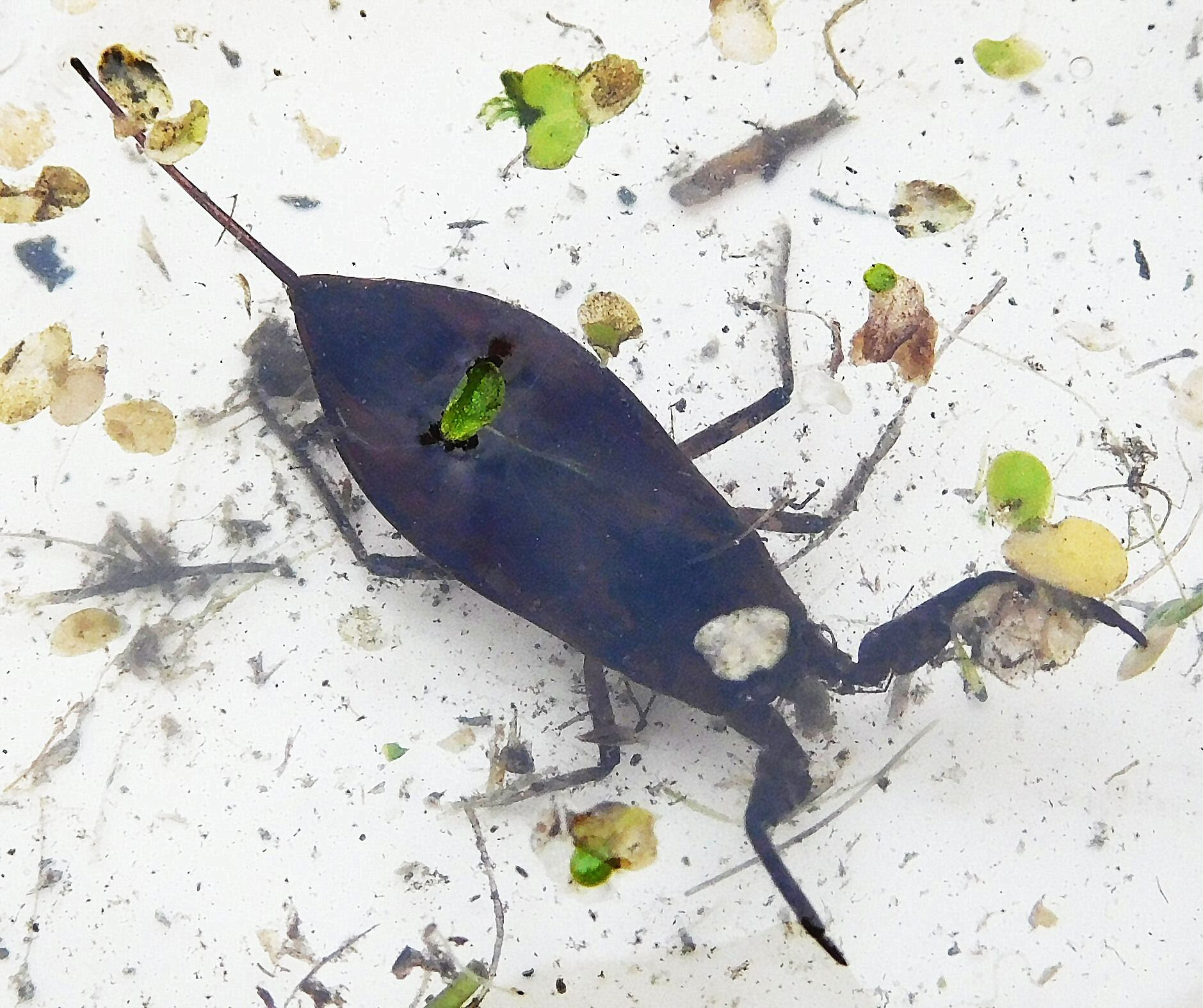

Scientific classification
- Kingdom: Animalia
- Phylum: Arthropoda
- Clade: Pancrustacea
- Class: Insecta
- Order: Hemiptera
- Suborder: Heteroptera
- Family: Nepidae
- Genus: Laccotrephes
- Species: L. tristis

Binomial name
- Laccotrephes tristis Stål (1854)
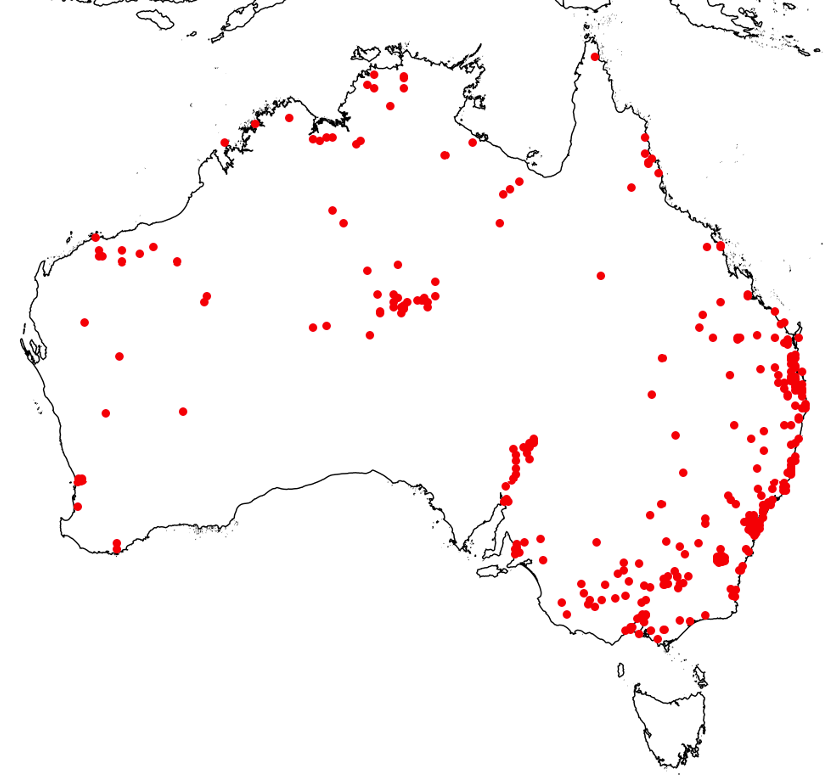
- Distribution map of Laccotrephes tristis in Australia

= Laccotrephes tristis =

Species of insect

Laccotrephes tristis is a species of water scorpion also commonly known as a toe-biter, that occurs Australia-wide and is part of the family Nepidae. They are an aquatic predatory insect that breathe air. Australian water scorpions inhabit shallow stagnant water, part of freshwater creeks, waterholes and gorges.

== Description ==
Laccotrephes tristis is brownish in colour with a broad oval shaped, flat body, at a length of 11–45 mm (0.43–1.77 in). Adult males have smaller body lengths (26–32 mm (1.0–1.3 in)) than females (31–35.5 mm (1.22–1.40 in)).

Australian water scorpions have six legs; the front two forelegs are pincer-like used for grasping aquatic prey and the hind legs are used for moving about. They have a relatively short, pointed head and small eyes. They have antennae with 3 segments and a finder-like projection, hidden in a groove beneath the eyes.

Water scorpions get their name from the tail-like respiratory siphon located on the end of their abdomen. The respiratory siphon is at least three quarters the length of the body. They use this siphon to transport air (a bit like a snorkel). A water scorpion breaths air from an air bubble trapped beneath its wings, which includes very small water repellent hairs. Oxygen from the air bubble is taken in through abdominal spiracles located on the abdomen. When the air bubble is almost depleted the water scorpion uses its respiratory siphon to break the water surface. Air then seeps into the siphon through a diffusion process, replenish the air bubble under the wings. Nymph forms have a much shorter respiratory siphon then adults.

== Ecology and behaviour ==
Water scorpions are poor swimmers, preferring slow moving or stagnant water where they "crawl" through the water. They usually hide in or on top of mud and/or submerged vegetation. They have often been seen covering their back with mud concealing themselves from view and waiting with their heads pointed in the direction of deeper water. Water scorpions can walk on land during a cloudy day particularly after rain. This particular species is also a strong flier, with well developed wings, however flight is very rarely observed.

=== Hunting and feeding ===
Water scorpions are a carnivorous ambush predator, hunting on the edges of shallow creeks or pools. They wait for prey to come within reach of their pincer-like forelegs, where they can grasp unsuspecting aquatic prey. Once the prey has been caught the water scorpion inserts its rostrum into the body of the victim and injects enzymes that liquify the insides. Finally, it consumes the liquified insides through its rostrum. Water scorpions feed on a variety of aquatic animals, such as tadpoles, small fish, and mosquito larvae.

=== Reproduction ===
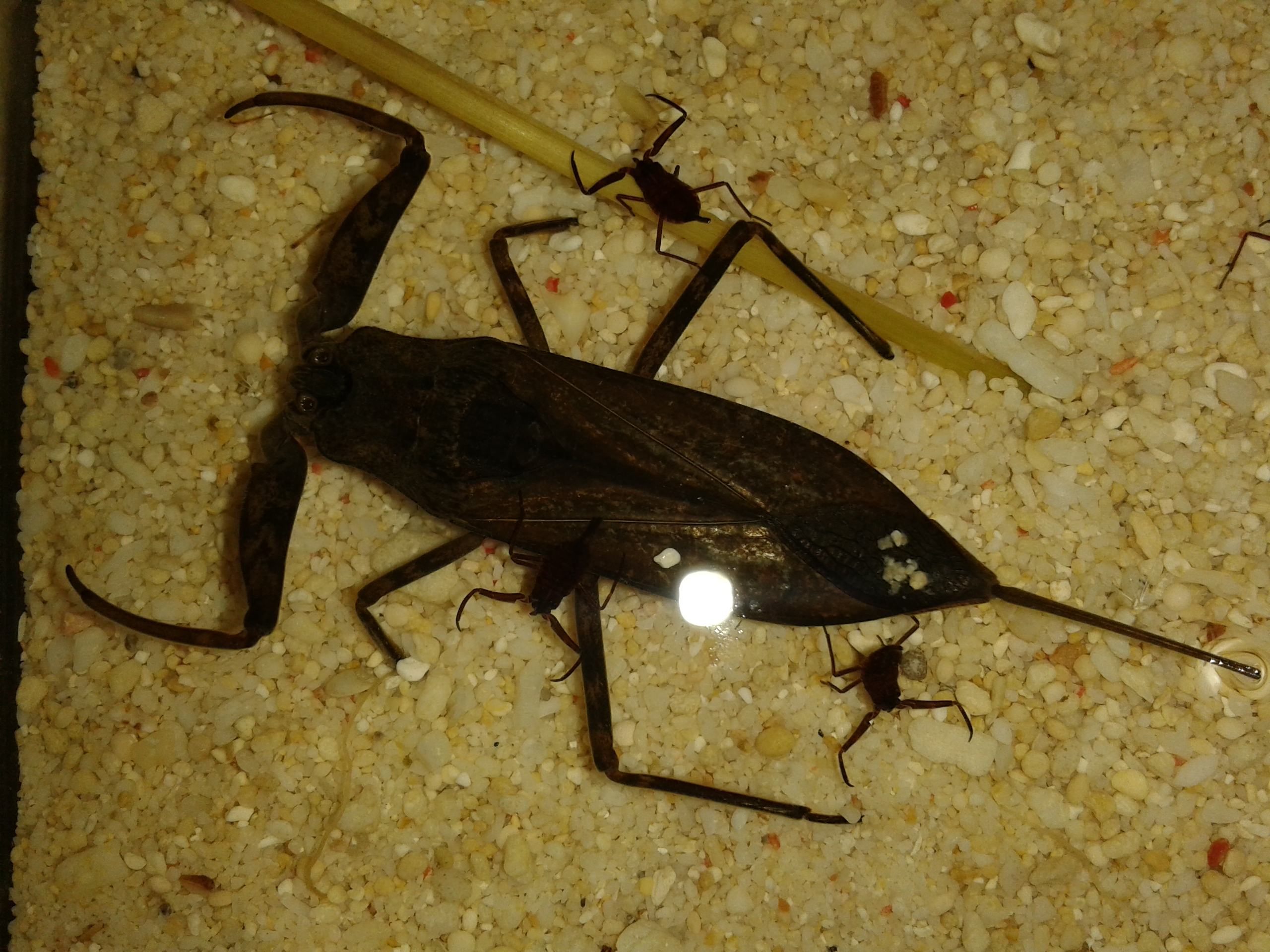
Laccotrephes tristis adult with three nymph forms

Eggs are approximately 3 mm (0.12 in) in length which possess between 8–10 slender respiratory horns located on the front end of the egg. These horns are arranged in a circular formation and are around 1.4 mm (0.055 in) long. Females deposit the eggs so that the respiratory horns are exposed to the air. The horn ensures respiration even when the egg is submerged in mud or water. Eggs are deposited at the boundary of the habitat, covered by mud by the female. Immediately after hatching the nymphs move to the water.

== Taxonomy ==
The subfamily Nepinae contain ten genera of which only one genus; Laccotrephes Stål is represented by one Australian species, Laccotrephes tristis.

== Distribution ==
Laccotrephes tristis occurs in all states of Australia except for Tasmania. It is also found throughout the Indonesian region. They can be found in many waterholes and gorges throughout Central Australia.
