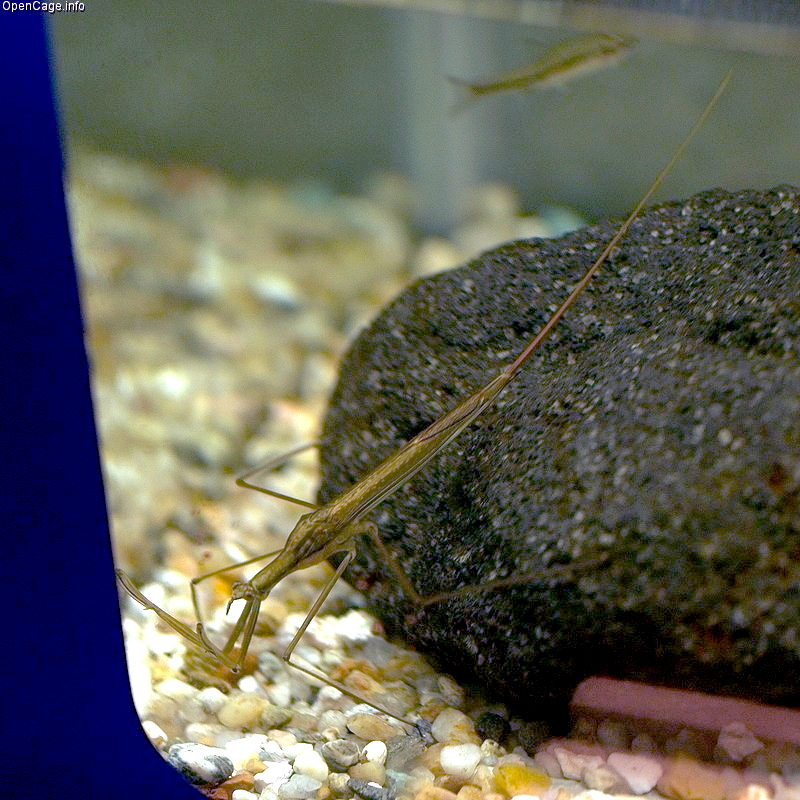
- Ranatra chinensis

Scientific classification
- Domain: Eukaryota
- Kingdom: Animalia
- Phylum: Arthropoda
- Class: Insecta
- Order: Hemiptera
- Suborder: Heteroptera
- Family: Nepidae
- Subfamily: Ranatrinae
- Genus: Ranatra; Fabricius, 1790

= Ranatra =

Genus of true bugs

Ranatra is a genus of slender predatory insects of the family Nepidae, known as Water mantis, water scorpions or water stick-insects. There are more than 140 Ranatra species found in freshwater habitats around the world, both in warm and temperate regions, with the highest diversity in South America (almost 50 species) and Asia (about 30 species, reviewed in 1972). Fewer are found elsewhere, but include several African, some in North America, three from Australia and three from the Palearctic, notably the relatively well-known European R. linearis. Since Ranatra belongs to the family Nepidae which in turn belongs to the order Hemiptera, Ranatra are considered "true bugs".

These brown insects are primarily found in stagnant or slow-moving water like ponds, marshes and canals, but can also be seen in streams. Exceptionally they have been recorded from hypersaline lakes and brackish lagoons.

== Biology ==
The front legs of bugs in Ranatra are strong and used to grasp prey. They typically eat other insects, tadpoles and small fish, which they pierce with their proboscis and inject a saliva which both sedates and begins to digest their prey. They are sit-and-wait predators that reside among water plants and position themselves head-down with their grasping legs extended out to surprise passing prey. At least one species will also swim in open water at night to catch zooplanktonic organisms. Like other members in the family they have a long tail-like siphon, or breathing tube, on the rear end of their body. The adult body length is generally 2–6 cm (0.8–2.4 in) depending on the exact species, and females average larger than males of the same species. The siphon is typically almost the same size, but varies from less than half the body length to somewhat longer. Two of the largest species are the East Asian R. chinensis and South American R. magna. Ranatra do have wings and they can fly.

The adults are active year-round, except in extreme cold. Their eggs are positioned on plants just below the water surface, but in some species they can be placed in mud. The eggs typically take two to four weeks to hatch and the young take about two months to mature.

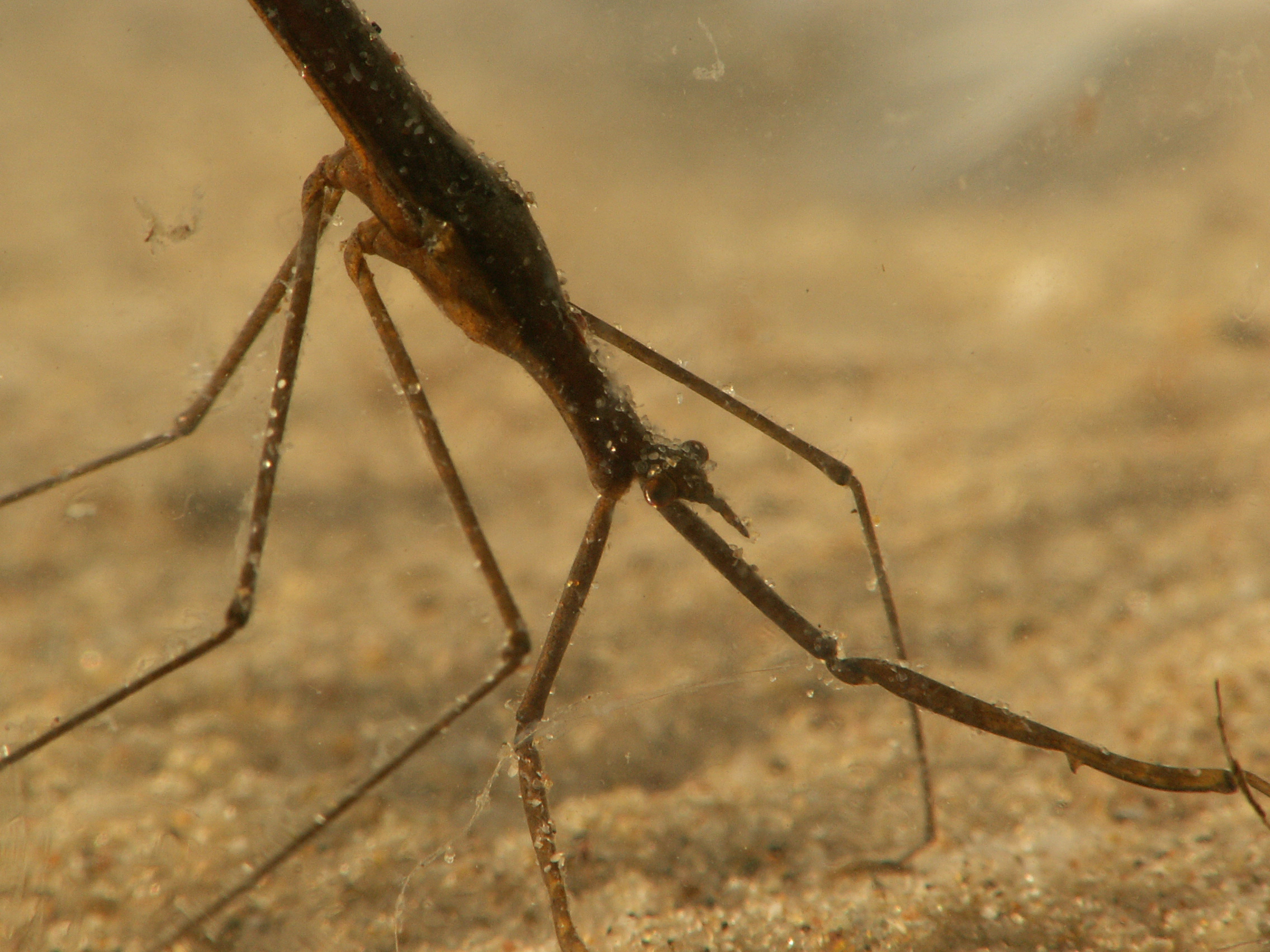
Ranatra linearis

Ranatra chinensis

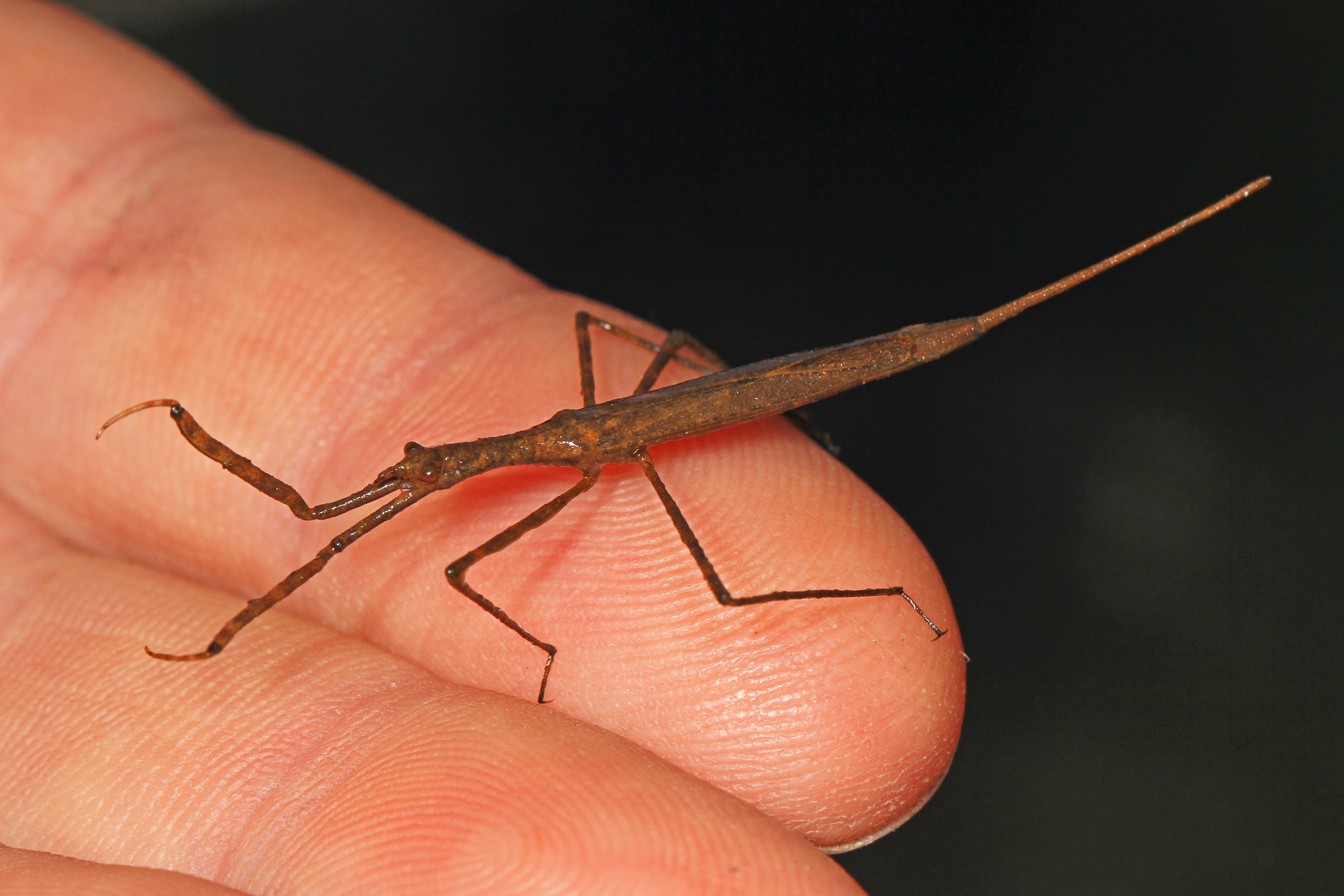
Ranatra crawling on human fingers

Among the four genera in the subfamily Ranatrinae, Austronepa and Goondnomdanepa are restricted to Australia. Cercotmetus from Asia to New Guinea resembles Ranatra, although the former has a distinctly shorter siphon.

== Species ==
The Global Biodiversity Information Facility lists:

1. Ranatra absona Drake & De Carlo, 1953
2. Ranatra acapulcana Drake & De Carlo, 1953
3. Ranatra adelmorpha Nieser, 1975
4. Ranatra aethiopica Montandon, 1903
5. Ranatra akoitachta Nieser, 1996
6. Ranatra ameghinoi De Carlo, 1970
7. Ranatra annulipes Stål, 1854
8. Ranatra attenuata Kuitert, 1949
9. Ranatra australis Hungerford, 1922^{i c g b} (southern water scorpion)
10. Ranatra bachmanni De Carlo, 1954
11. Ranatra bilobata Tran & Nguyen, 2016
12. Ranatra biroi Lundblad, 1933
13. Ranatra bottegoi Montandon, 1903
14. Ranatra brasiliensis De Carlo, 1946
15. Ranatra brevicauda Montandon, 1905
16. Ranatra brevicollis Montandon, 1910^{i c g b}
17. Ranatra buenoi Hungerford, 1922^{i c g b}
18. Ranatra camposi Montandon, 1907
19. Ranatra capensis Germar, 1837
20. Ranatra cardamomensis Zettel, Phauk, Kheam & Freitag, 2017
21. Ranatra chagasi De Carlo, 1946
22. Ranatra chariensis Poisson, 1949
23. Ranatra chinensis Mayr, 1865
24. Ranatra cinnamomea Distant, 1904
25. Ranatra compressicollis Montandon, 1898
26. Ranatra costalimai De Carlo, 1954
27. Ranatra cruzi De Carlo, 1950
28. Ranatra curtafemorata Kuitert, 1949
29. Ranatra denticulipes Montandon, 1907
30. Ranatra digitata Hafiz & Pradhan, 1949
31. Ranatra diminuta Montandon, 1907
32. Ranatra dispar Montandon, 1903
33. Ranatra distanti Montandon, 1910
34. Ranatra doesburgi De Carlo, 1963
35. Ranatra dolichodentata Kuitert, 1949
36. Ranatra dormientis Zhang et al., 1994
37. Ranatra drakei Hungerford, 1922
38. Ranatra ecuadoriensis De Carlo, 1950
39. Ranatra elongata Fabricius, 1790
40. Ranatra emaciata Montandon, 1907
41. Ranatra fabricii Guérin-Méneville, 1857
42. Ranatra falloui Montandon, 1907
43. Ranatra feana Montandon, 1903
44. Ranatra fianarantsoana Poisson, 1963
45. Ranatra filiformis Fabricius, 1790
46. Ranatra flagellata Lansbury, 1972
47. Ranatra flokata Nieser & Burmeister, 1998
48. Ranatra fusca Palisot, 1820^{i c g b} (brown waterscorpion)
49. Ranatra fuscoannulata Distant, 1904
50. Ranatra galantae Nieser, 1969
51. Ranatra gracilis Dallas, 1850
52. Ranatra grandicollis Montandon, 1907
53. Ranatra grandocula Bergroth, 1893
54. Ranatra hechti De Carlo, 1967
55. Ranatra heoki Tran & Poggi, 2019
56. Ranatra heydeni Montandon, 1909
57. Ranatra horvathi Montandon, 1910
58. Ranatra hungerfordi Kuitert, 1949
59. Ranatra incisa Chen, Nieser & Ho, 2004
60. Ranatra instaurata Montandon, 1914
61. Ranatra insulata Barber, 1939
62. Ranatra jamaicana Drake & De Carlo, 1953
63. Ranatra katsara Nieser, 1997
64. Ranatra kirkaldyi Torre-bueno, 1905^{i c g b}
65. Ranatra lanei De Carlo, 1946
66. Ranatra lansburyi Chen, Nieser & Ho, 2004
67. Ranatra lenti De Carlo, 1950
68. Ranatra lethierryi Montandon, 1907
69. Ranatra libera Zettel, 1999
70. Ranatra linearis (Linnaeus, 1758)^{i c g}
71. Ranatra longipes Stål, 1861
72. Ranatra lualalai Poisson, 1964
73. Ranatra lubwae Poisson, 1965
74. Ranatra machrisi Nieser & Burmeister, 1998
75. Ranatra macrophthalma Herrich-Schäffer, 1849
76. Ranatra maculosa Kuitert, 1949
77. Ranatra magna Kuitert, 1949
78. Ranatra malayana Lundblad, 1933
79. Ranatra mediana Montandon, 1910
80. Ranatra megalops Lansbury, 1972
81. Ranatra mixta Montandon, 1907
82. Ranatra moderata Kuitert, 1949
83. Ranatra montei De Carlo, 1946
84. Ranatra montezuma Polhemus, 1976
85. Ranatra natalensis Distant, 1904
86. Ranatra natunaensis Lansbury, 1972
87. Ranatra neivai De Carlo, 1946
88. Ranatra nieseri Tran & Nguyen, 2016
89. Ranatra nigra Herrich-Schaeffer, 1849
90. Ranatra nodiceps Gerstaecker, 1873
91. Ranatra nodioeps Gerstaecker, 1873
92. Ranatra obscura Montandon, 1907
93. Ranatra occidentalis Lansbury, 1972
94. Ranatra odontomeros Nieser, 1996
95. Ranatra oliveiracesari De Carlo, 1946
96. Ranatra operculata Kuitert, 1949
97. Ranatra ornitheia Nieser, 1975
98. Ranatra parmata Mayr, 1865
99. Ranatra parvipes Signoret, 1861
100. Ranatra parvula Kuitert, 1949
101. Ranatra pittieri Montandon, 1910
102. Ranatra protense Montandon
103. Ranatra quadridentata Stål, 1862^{i c g b}
104. Ranatra rabida Buchanan White, 1879
105. Ranatra rafflesi Tran & D.Polhemus, 2012
106. Ranatra rapax Stål, 1865
107. Ranatra recta Chen, Nieser & Ho, 2004
108. Ranatra robusta Montandon, 1905
109. Ranatra sagrai Drake & De Carlo, 1953
110. Ranatra sarmientoi De Carlo, 1967
111. Ranatra sattleri De Carlo, 1967
112. Ranatra schuhi D.Polhemus & J.Polhemus, 2012
113. Ranatra segrega Montandon, 1913
114. Ranatra signoreti Montandon, 1905
115. Ranatra similis Drake & De Carlo, 1953
116. Ranatra siolii De Carlo, 1970
117. Ranatra sjostedti Montandon, 1911
118. Ranatra spatulata Kuitert, 1949
119. Ranatra spinifrons Montandon, 1905
120. Ranatra spoliata Montandon, 1912
121. Ranatra stali Montandon, 1905
122. Ranatra sterea Chen, Nieser & Ho, 2004
123. Ranatra subinermis Montandon, 1907
124. Ranatra sulawesii Nieser & Chen, 1991
125. Ranatra surinamensis De Carlo, 1963
126. Ranatra texana Hungerford, 1930
127. Ranatra thai Lansbury, 1972
128. Ranatra titilaensis Hafiz & Pradhan, 1949
129. Ranatra travassosi De Carlo, 1950
130. Ranatra tridentata Poisson, 1965
131. Ranatra tuberculifrons Montandon, 1907
132. Ranatra unicolor Scott, 1874
133. Ranatra unidentata Stål, 1861
134. Ranatra usingeri De Carlo, 1970
135. Ranatra varicolor Distant, 1904
136. Ranatra varipes Stål, 1861
137. Ranatra vitshumbii Poisson, 1949
138. Ranatra wagneri Hungerford, 1929
139. Ranatra weberi De Carlo, 1970
140. Ranatra williamsi Kuitert, 1949
141. Ranatra zeteki Drake & De Carlo, 1953

Data sources: i = ITIS, c = Catalogue of Life, g = GBIF, b = Bugguide.net
