= Dreneto =

Protected area in Bulgaria

Protected area "Dreneto"
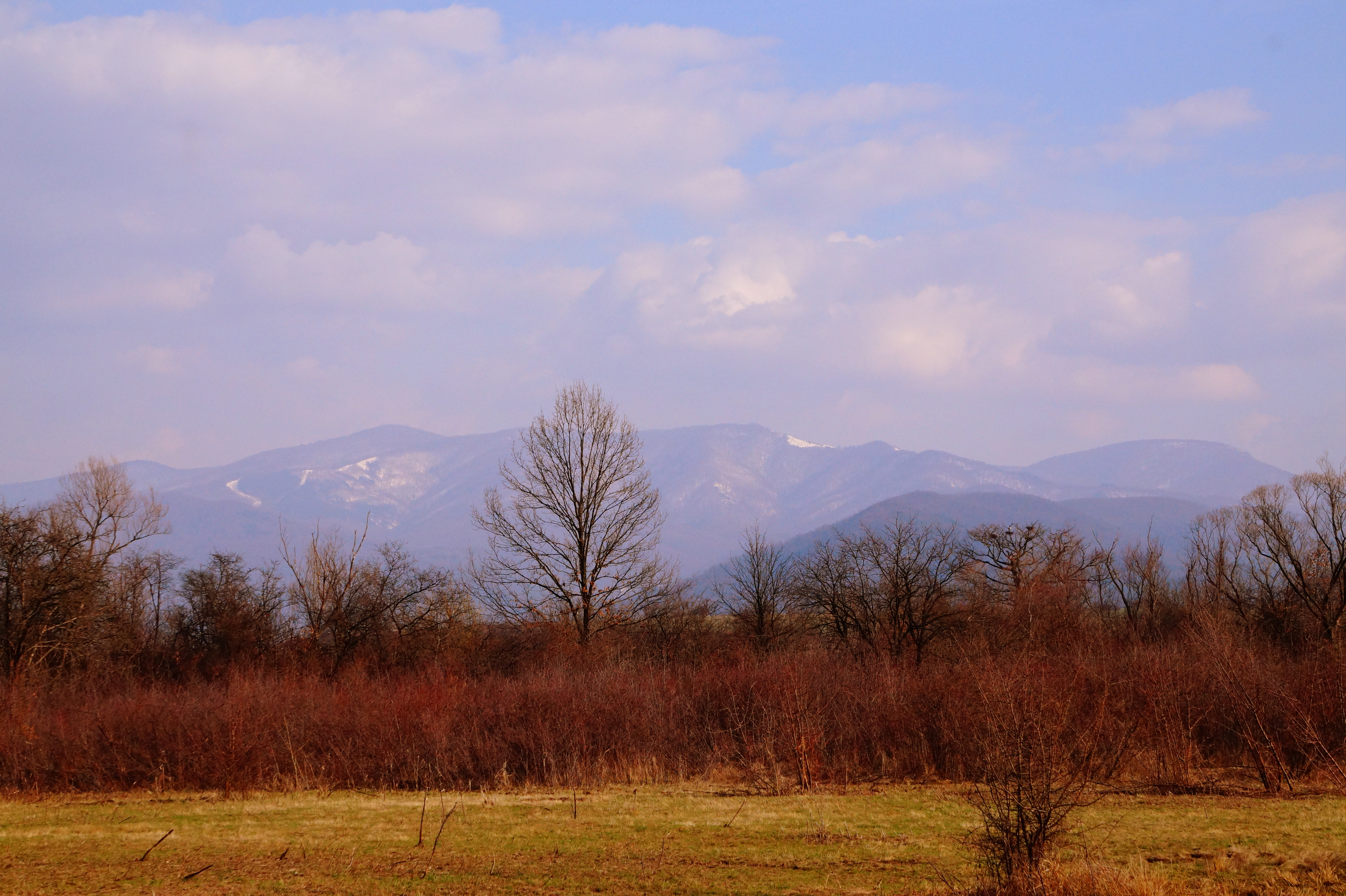

- Location within Bulgaria
- Location: Botevgrad, Bulgaria
- Coordinates: 42.93°N 23.718°E
- Area: 33 ha (82 acres)
- Established: 19 October 1979

Dreneto (Bulgarian: Дренето) is a protected area in the western Balkan Mountains of Bulgaria. It is located in Botevgrad Municipality in the land of the village of Litakovo. Under the name "Dreneto" are united the following localities: "Dreneto", "Babanova Curia", "Shavara" and "Draganova ornitsa". The protected area was established on 19 October 1979 by the Committee for the Protection of the Natural Environment. Dreneto has a total area of 33 hectares.

When the site was declared a protected area, it was mostly marshland. Nowadays, due to climate changes, the site is drying out and serious care is taken for its protection and conservation. Hunting, logging and construction are prohibited.

== Ecology ==
The protected area includes natural meadows and old-growth oak forests which provide nesting ground for gray herons and white storks.

The grassland is from the lowland grassland meadows type and include herbaceous plants such as docks (Rumex), reedmace (Typha), duckweed (Lemnoideae), etc. Among the tree and shrub species that can be found in Dreneto are common walnut (Juglans regia), European alder (Alnus glutinosa), white willow (Salix alba), field elm (Ulmus minor), European elder (Sambucus nigra), etc. There are 11 oak trees that are about 500 years old.

Among the most common vertebrates are: long-tailed tit, corn bunting, hooded crow, white stork, Spanish sparrow, common buzzard, common kestrel, common frog, smooth newt. The marshlands are home to invertebrates, such as water scorpions (Nepa cinerea) and several dragonfly species (Odonata).
