= Ranatra quadridentata =

Scientific classification
- Kingdom: Animalia
- Phylum: Arthropoda
- Clade: Pancrustacea
- Class: Insecta
- Order: Hemiptera
- Suborder: Heteroptera
- Family: Nepidae
- Genus: Ranatra
- Species: R. quadridentata

Binomial name
- Ranatra quadridentata Stål, 1862

Species of true bug

Ranatra quadridentata is a species of waterscorpion in the family Nepidae. It is found in Central America and North America.
