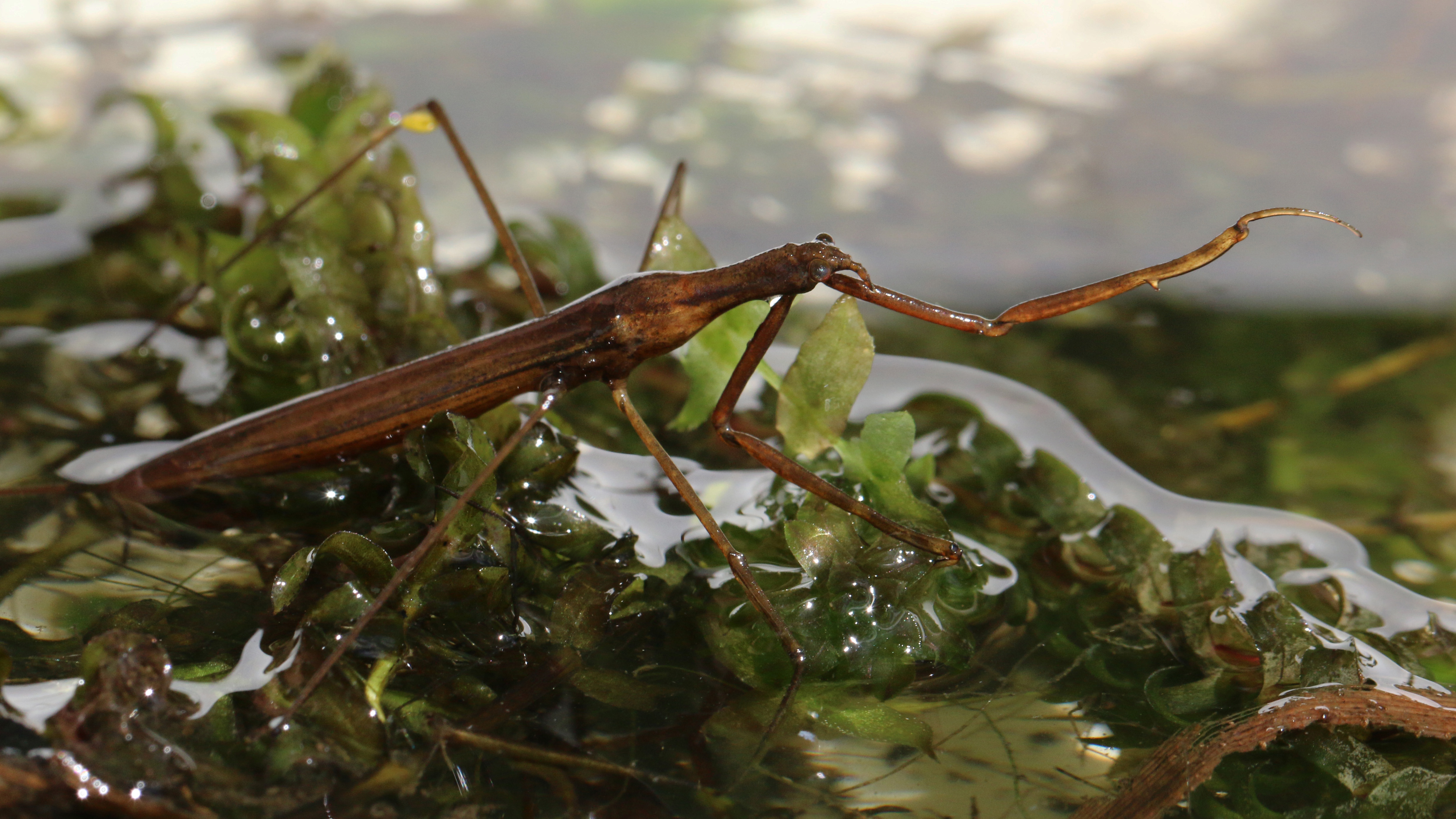

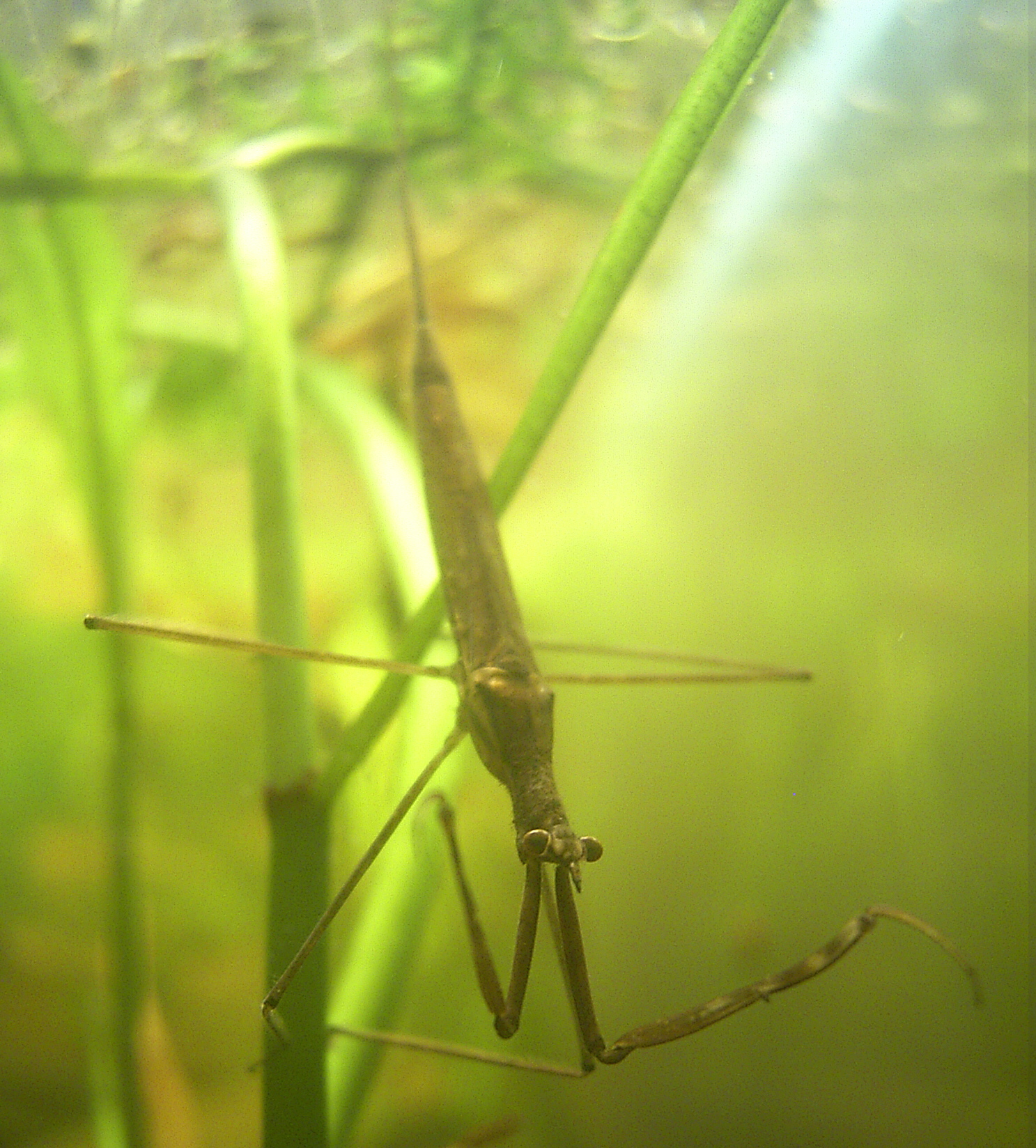

Scientific classification
- Kingdom: Animalia
- Phylum: Arthropoda
- Class: Insecta
- Order: Hemiptera
- Suborder: Heteroptera
- Family: Nepidae
- Subfamily: Ranatrinae
- Genus: Ranatra
- Species: R. linearis

Binomial name
- Ranatra linearis (Linnaeus, 1758)

= Ranatra linearis =

Species of true bug

Ranatra linearis is a species of aquatic bug in the Nepidae family. It is native to Eurasia and North Africa, and primarily found near aquatic plants in ponds, marshes and other freshwater habitats, but has exceptionally been recorded from hypersaline lakes and brackish lagoons.

== Description ==
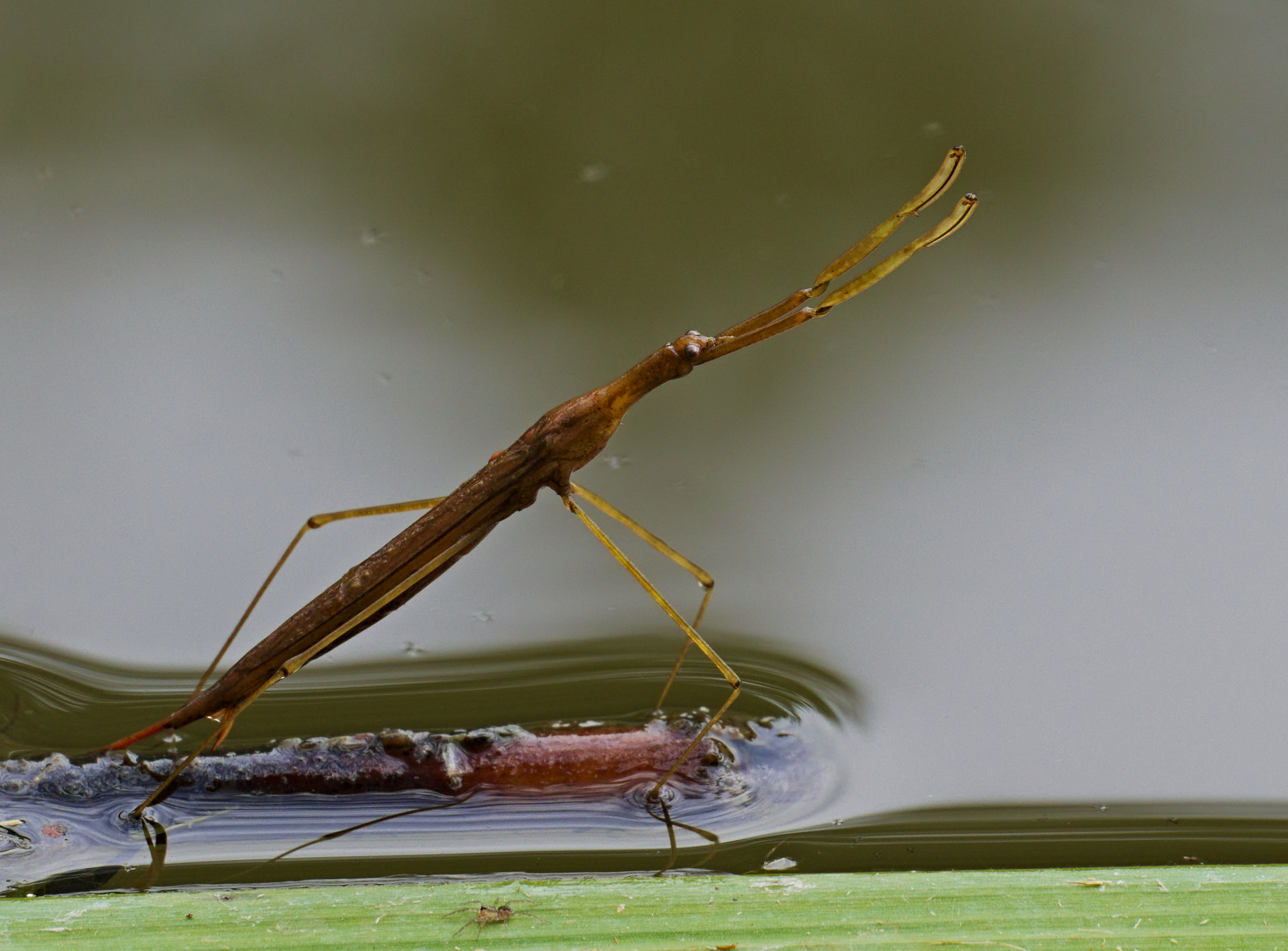
Female laying eggs

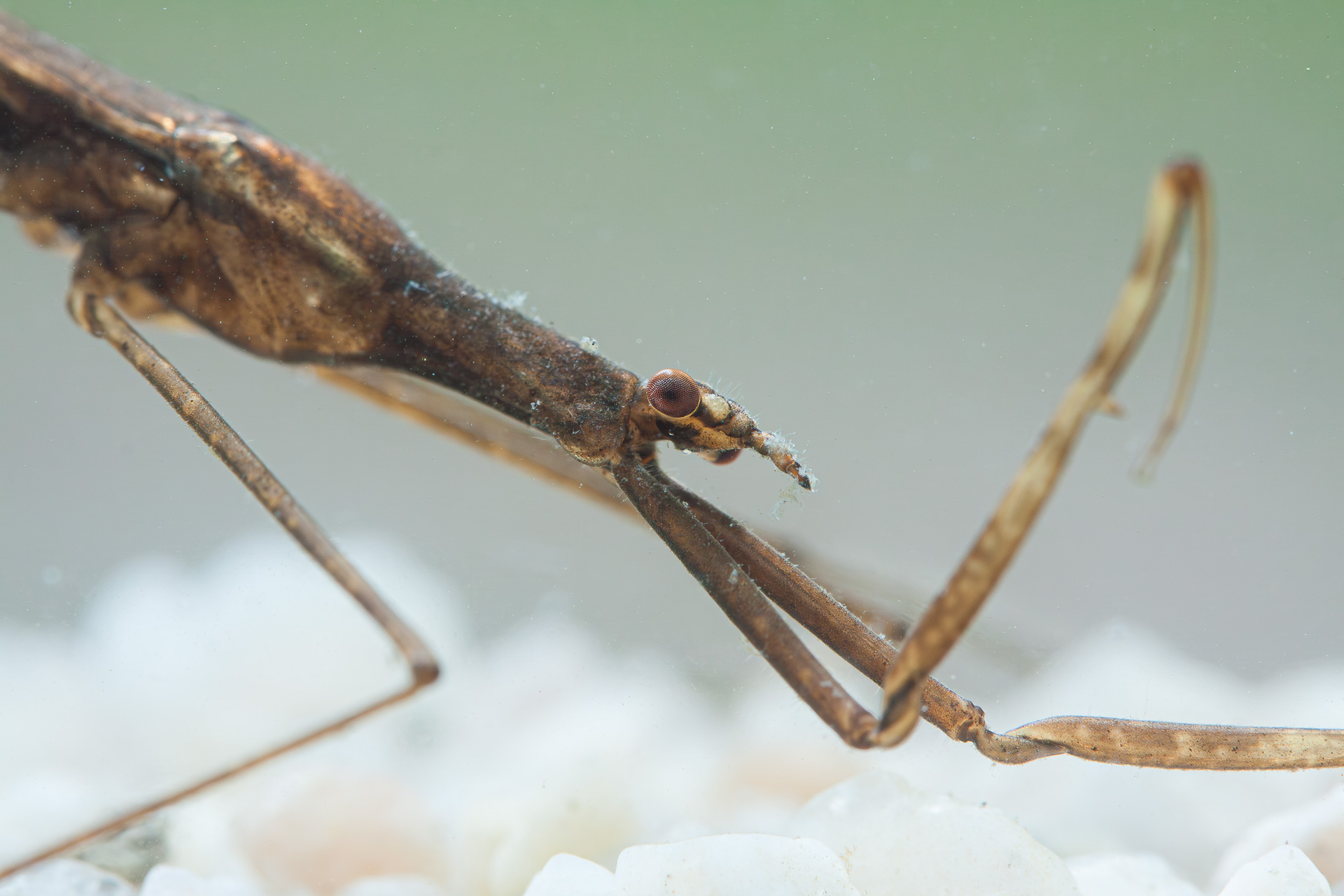
Ranatra linearis, detail of the head.

The body of these brown insects is typically 3–3.5 cm (1.2–1.4 in) long. Their breathing tube tail is usually about as long as the body of the insect. They are swimming insects, and the adults can fly.
