= Priscilla Hussey =

American entomologist (1894–1946)

Edith Priscilla Butler Hussey (January 24, 1894 – 21 January 1946) was an American entomologist and biology professor who wrote numerous scientific articles and poems featured in many different magazines. She was a faculty member at the Northwestern State College of Louisiana for 17 years.

Priscilla Hussey was born on 24 January 1894. She attended the University of Michigan where she received an A.B. in zoology. In her later life she earned her M.A. from Smith College and her S.D. from Radcliffe College. She was a biology professor at New York University (the Washington Square branch) and Louisiana State Normal College and was a member of many organizations such as the Louisiana Academy of Sciences, the American Association for the Advancement of Science, New York Entomological Society and the Entomological Society of America. She married Dr. Roland F. Hussey on 8 September 1923 in Battle Creek, Michigan. Together they had three children: Barbara Ruth Hussey (born 4 June 1924), Roland Fountain Hussey, Jr. (born 15 October 1925), and William Joseph Hussey (born 31 August 1927). They later divorced in 1929. She died on 21 January 1946 in Natchitoches, Louisiana after a long illness.

Her works include Studies on the Pleuropodia of Belostoma flumineum Say and Ranatra fusca Palisot de Beauvois, with a discussion of these organs in other insects in 1926.
