= Curicta =

Curicta may refer to:

- Curicta (bug), a genus of bugs in the family Nepidae (water scorpions)
- the Latin name for the island of Krk, Croatia
