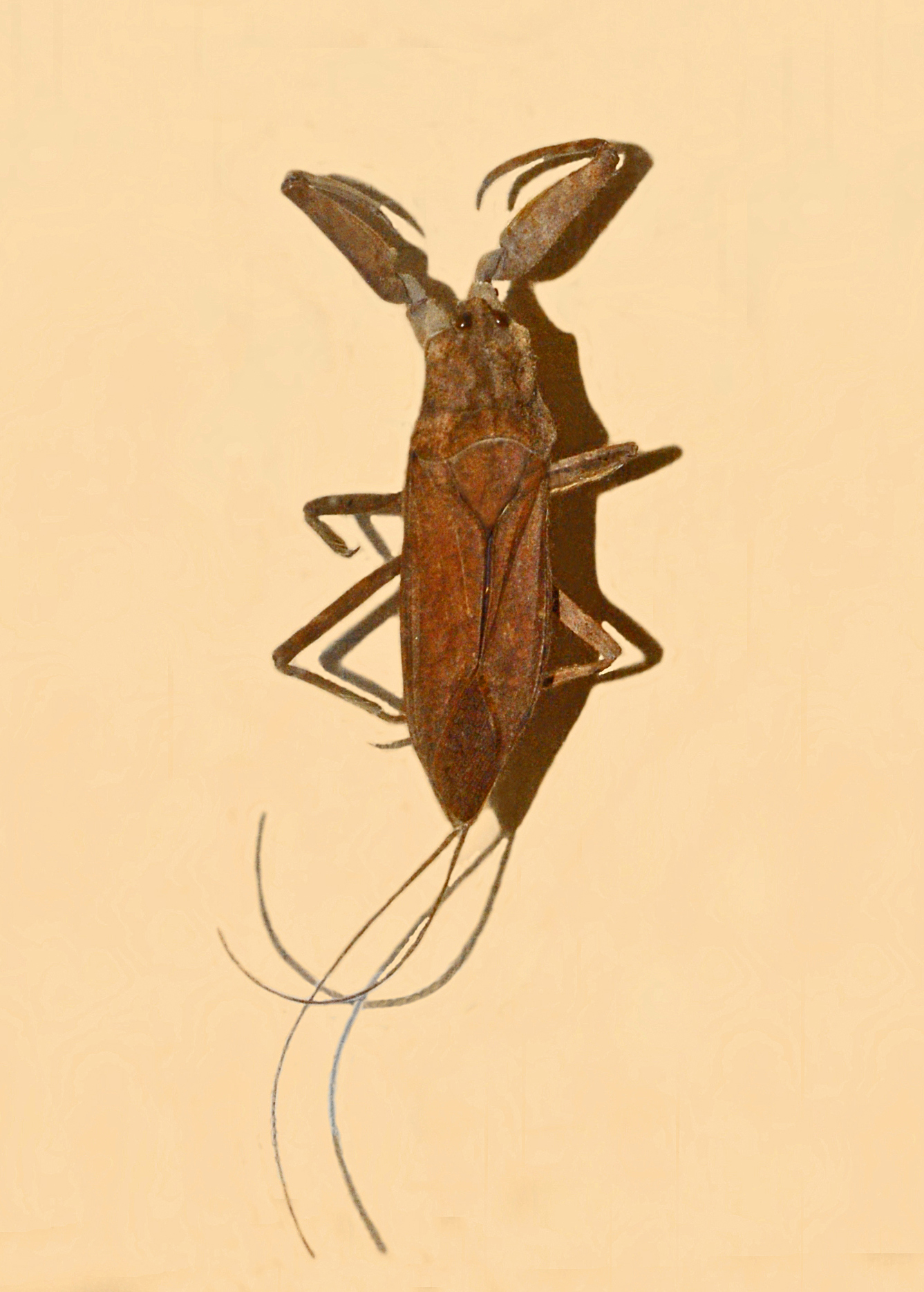
- Laccotrephes pfeiferiae from Myanmar, museum specimen

Scientific classification
- Domain: Eukaryota
- Kingdom: Animalia
- Phylum: Arthropoda
- Class: Insecta
- Order: Hemiptera
- Suborder: Heteroptera
- Family: Nepidae
- Genus: Laccotrephes
- Species: L. pfeiferiae

Binomial name
- Laccotrephes pfeiferiae (Ferrari, 1888)

Synonyms
- Nepa pfeiferiae Ferrari, 1888

= Laccotrephes pfeiferiae =

Species of true bug

Laccotrephes pfeiferiae is a species of water scorpion belonging to the family Nepidae. It was until 1999 considered synonym of Laccotrephes robustus; records of L. robustus outside the Philippines refer to this species.

== Description ==
Laccotrephes pfeiferiae can reach a length of about 45–50 millimetres (1.8–2.0 in). Body color varies from brown to dark brown. A breathing tube, up to 32–35 millimetres (1.3–1.4 in), located at the end of an elongated abdomen, can be kept out of the water to breathe.

== Distribution ==
This species can be found in Myanmar, Thailand, West Malaysia, Indonesia (Sumatra, Java), southern China, and Taiwan.
