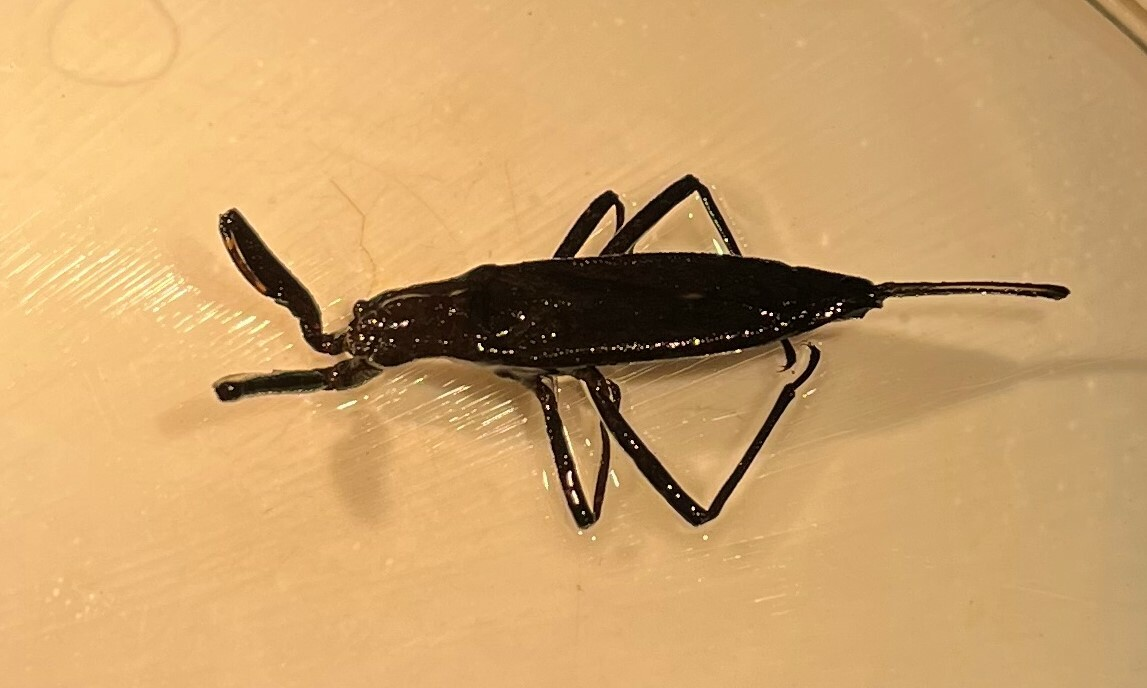

Scientific classification
- Domain: Eukaryota
- Kingdom: Animalia
- Phylum: Arthropoda
- Class: Insecta
- Order: Hemiptera
- Suborder: Heteroptera
- Family: Nepidae
- Genus: Curicta
- Species: C. pronotata

Binomial name
- Curicta pronotata Kuitert, 1949

= Curicta pronotata =

Species of true bug

Curicta pronotata is a species of waterscorpion in the family Nepidae. It is found in Central America and North America. They live in mountain streams and can blend with leaves to hide, but if found they will play dead, though they can also give a powerful bite. The best chance of encountering them is in spring through fall and like most water scorpions are carnivorous. Females lay their eggs on the shore.
