= Ranatra buenoi =

Scientific classification
- Domain: Eukaryota
- Kingdom: Animalia
- Phylum: Arthropoda
- Class: Insecta
- Order: Hemiptera
- Suborder: Heteroptera
- Family: Nepidae
- Genus: Ranatra
- Species: R. buenoi

Binomial name
- Ranatra buenoi Hungerford, 1922

Species of true bug

Ranatra buenoi is a species of waterscorpion in the family Nepidae. It is found in North America.
