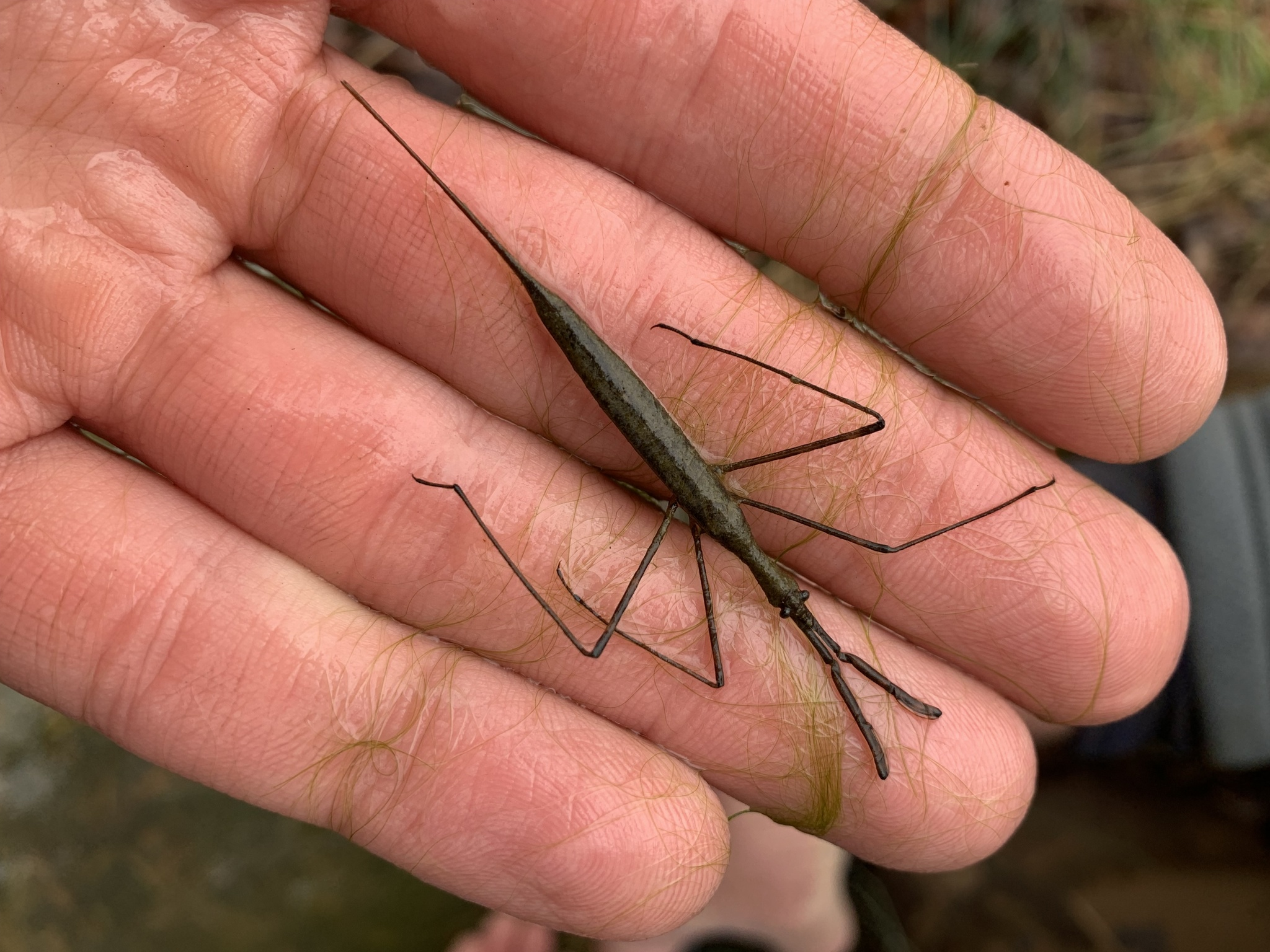

Scientific classification
- Domain: Eukaryota
- Kingdom: Animalia
- Phylum: Arthropoda
- Class: Insecta
- Order: Hemiptera
- Suborder: Heteroptera
- Family: Nepidae
- Genus: Ranatra
- Species: R. kirkaldyi

Binomial name
- Ranatra kirkaldyi Torre-bueno, 1905

= Ranatra kirkaldyi =

Species of true bug

Ranatra kirkaldyi is a species of waterscorpion in the family Nepidae. It is found in North America.

== Subspecies ==
These two subspecies belong to the species Ranatra kirkaldyi:

- Ranatra kirkaldyi hoffmanni Hungerford, 1922
- Ranatra kirkaldyi kirkaldyi Torre-Bueno, 1905
