= Ranatra brevicollis =

Scientific classification
- Domain: Eukaryota
- Kingdom: Animalia
- Phylum: Arthropoda
- Class: Insecta
- Order: Hemiptera
- Suborder: Heteroptera
- Family: Nepidae
- Genus: Ranatra
- Species: R. brevicollis

Binomial name
- Ranatra brevicollis Montandon, 1910

Species of true bug

Ranatra brevicollis is a species of waterscorpion in the family Nepidae. It is found in Central America and North America.
