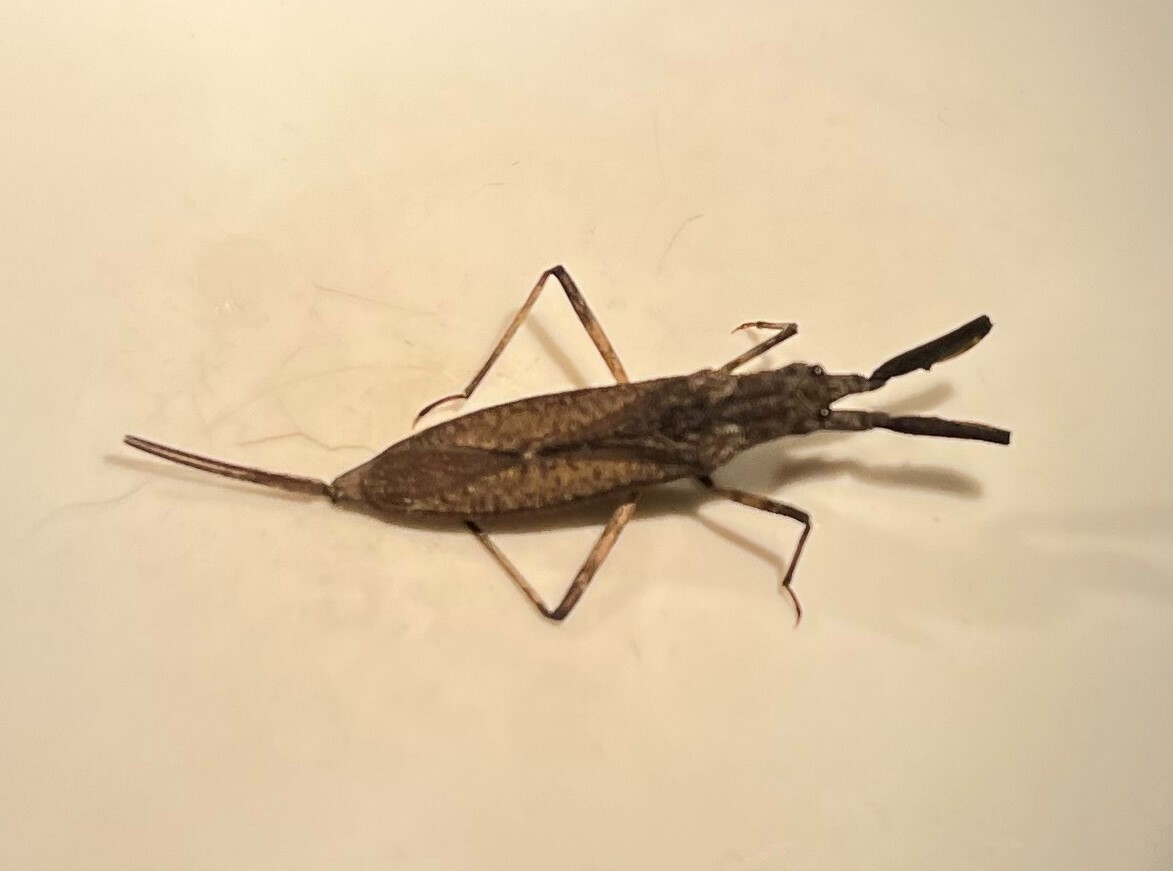

Scientific classification
- Kingdom: Animalia
- Phylum: Arthropoda
- Clade: Pancrustacea
- Class: Insecta
- Order: Hemiptera
- Suborder: Heteroptera
- Family: Nepidae
- Genus: Curicta
- Species: C. scorpio

Binomial name
- Curicta scorpio Stål, 1862

Synonyms
- Curicta howardi Montandon, 1910

= Curicta scorpio =

Species of insect

Curicta scorpio is a species of waterscorpion in the family Nepidae. It is found in Central America and North America.
