= Ranatra australis =

Scientific classification
- Domain: Eukaryota
- Kingdom: Animalia
- Phylum: Arthropoda
- Class: Insecta
- Order: Hemiptera
- Suborder: Heteroptera
- Family: Nepidae
- Genus: Ranatra
- Species: R. australis

Binomial name
- Ranatra australis Hungerford, 1922

Species of true bug

Ranatra australis, the southern water scorpion, is a species of waterscorpion in the family Nepidae. It is found in North America.
