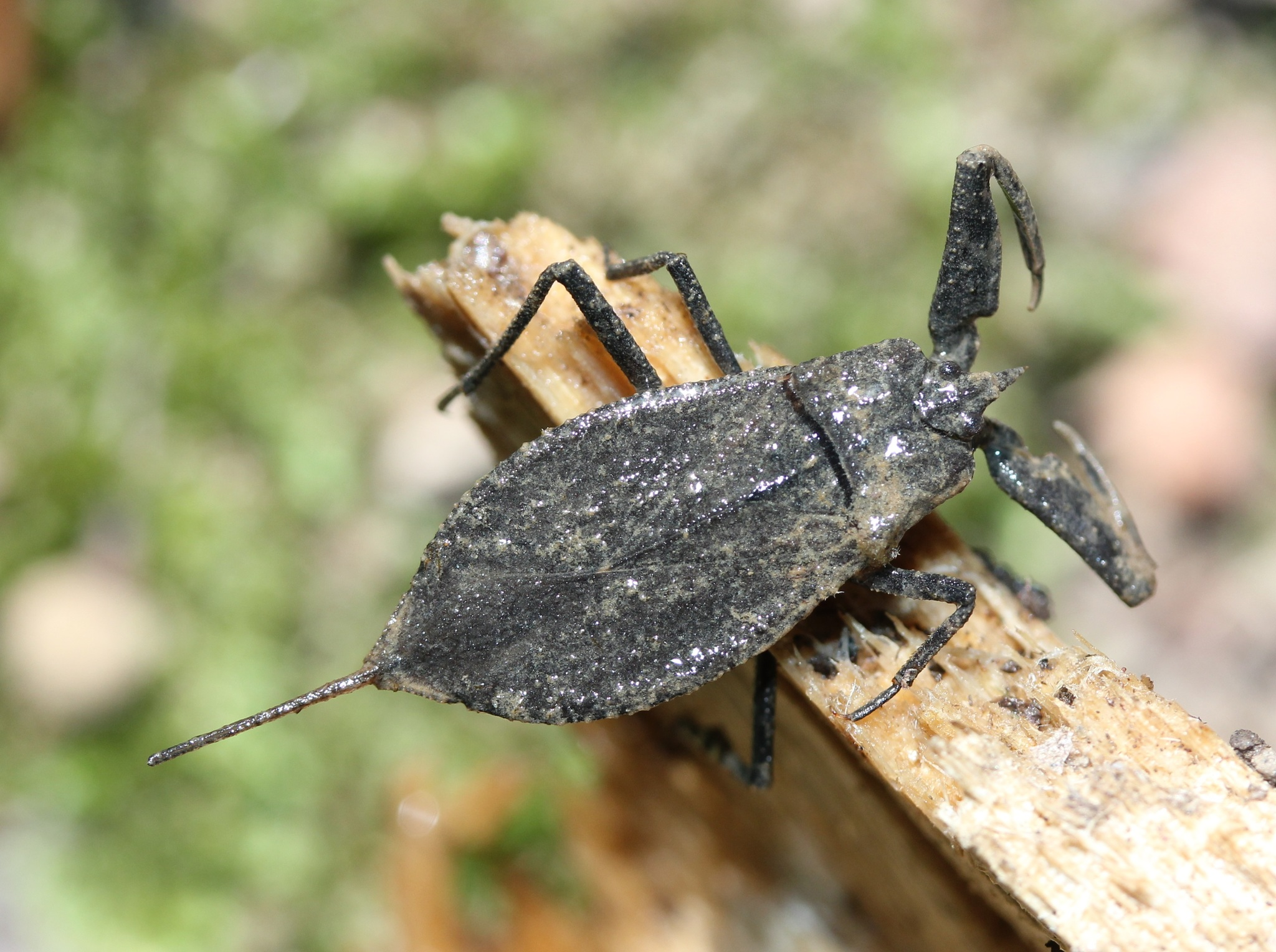

Scientific classification
- Domain: Eukaryota
- Kingdom: Animalia
- Phylum: Arthropoda
- Class: Insecta
- Order: Hemiptera
- Suborder: Heteroptera
- Family: Nepidae
- Genus: Nepa
- Species: N. apiculata

Binomial name
- Nepa apiculata Uhler, 1862

= Nepa apiculata =

Species of true bug

Nepa apiculata is a species of waterscorpion in the family Nepidae. It is found in eastern North America (Canada and United States). This species is active from spring to fall and feed on a wide variety of aquatic invertebrates. They have leaf-shaped bodies which allow them to camouflage. They've been known to hibernate during droughts as well as winter.
