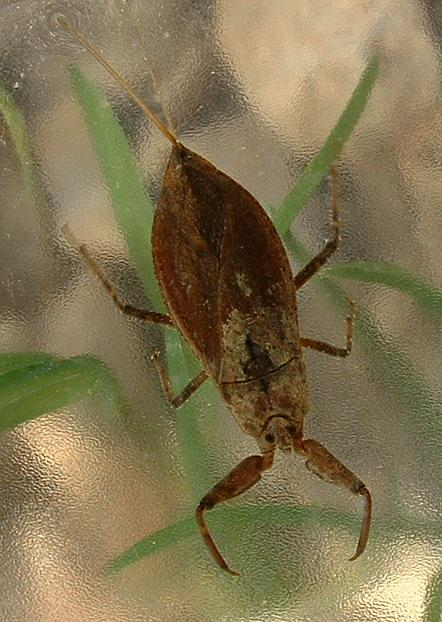

Scientific classification
- Kingdom: Animalia
- Phylum: Arthropoda
- Clade: Pancrustacea
- Class: Insecta
- Order: Hemiptera
- Suborder: Heteroptera
- Family: Nepidae
- Subfamily: Nepinae
- Genus: Nepa
- Species: N. cinerea

Binomial name
- Nepa cinerea Linnaeus, 1758

= Nepa cinerea =

Species of true bug

Nepa cinerea is a species of water scorpion (Nepidae), found in most of Europe, including the British Isles, as well as North Africa and southern and northern Asia.

== Habitat and biology ==
A water scorpion (N. cinerea) climbing on leaves of European waterclover (Marsilea quadrifolia) before flying away

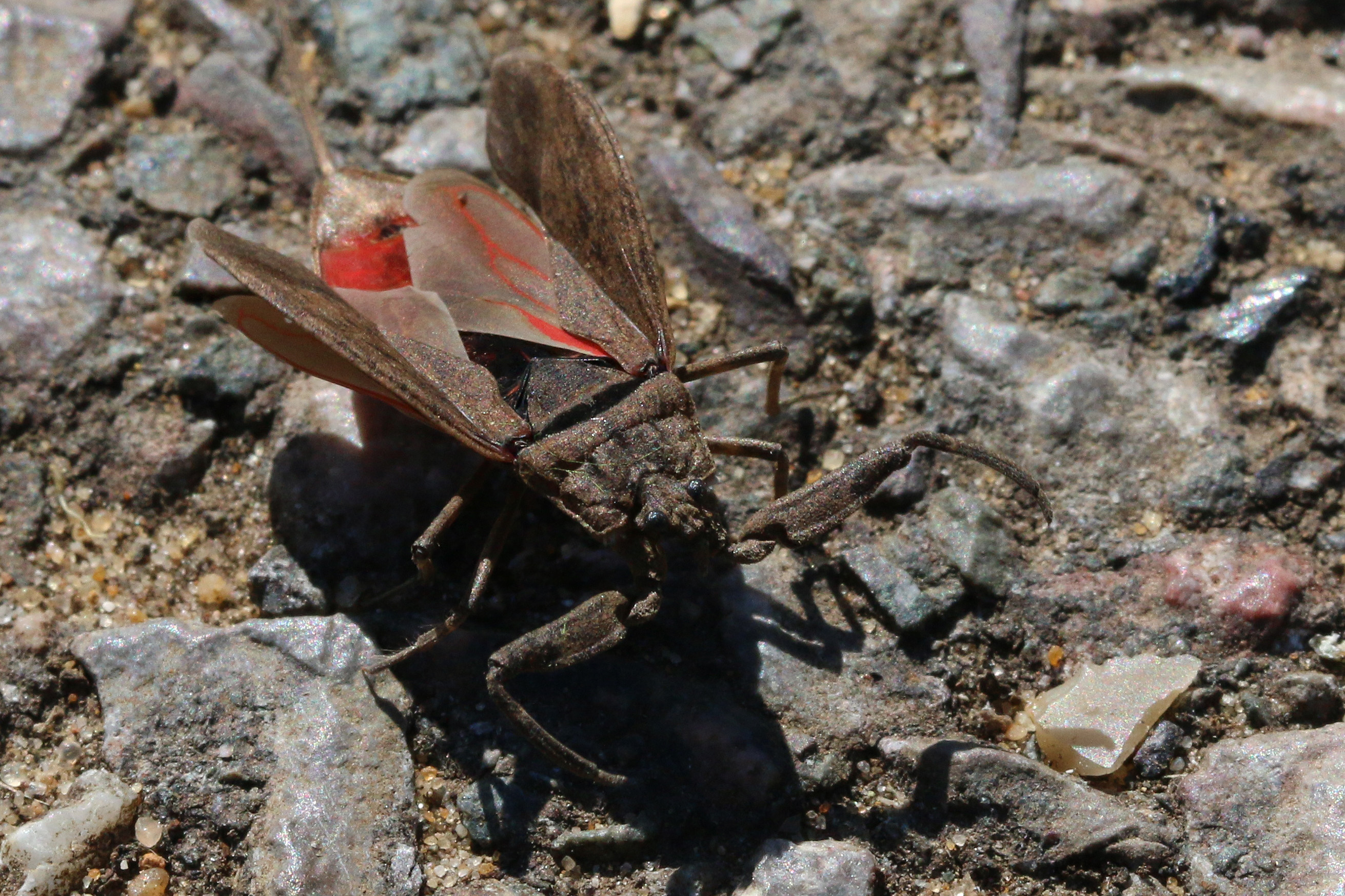
Nepa cinerea with open forewings, revealing its usually hidden hindwings and red abdomen

It lives in ponds, small rivers, and stagnant water, and feeds upon aquatic animals, especially insects.

Respiration in the adult is effected by means of the caudal process, which consists of a pair of half-tubes capable of being locked together to form a siphon by means of which air is conducted to the tracheae at the apex of the abdomen when the tip of the tube is thrust above the surface of the water. In immature forms, the siphon is undeveloped and breathing takes place through six pairs of abdominal spiracles. The eggs, laid in the stems of plants, are supplied with seven filamentous processes which float freely in the water.
