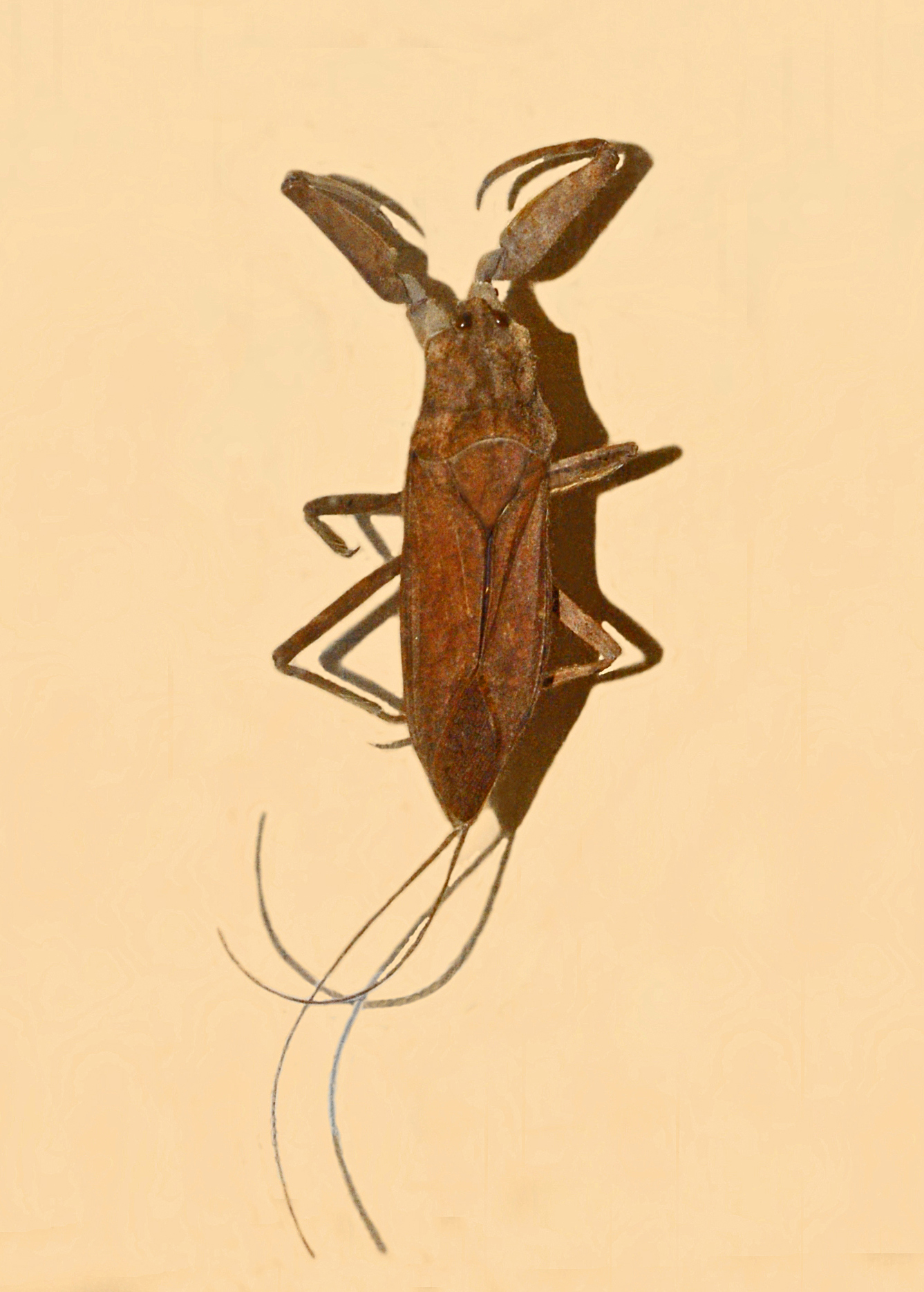
- Laccotrephes pfeiferiae

Scientific classification
- Kingdom: Animalia
- Phylum: Arthropoda
- Clade: Pancrustacea
- Class: Insecta
- Order: Hemiptera
- Suborder: Heteroptera
- Superfamily: Nepoidea
- Family: Nepidae
- Subfamily: Nepinae
- Genus: Laccotrephes; Stål, 1866

= Laccotrephes =

Genus of true bugs

Laccotrephes is a genus of water scorpion belonging to the family Nepidae. They are carnivorous insects that hunt near the water surface. They are not aggressive, but may inflict a painful bite if not handled carefully, which may cause a local reaction. There are about 60 species found in shallow stagnant or slow-moving waters in warm parts of Africa, Asia and Australia.

== Anatomy ==
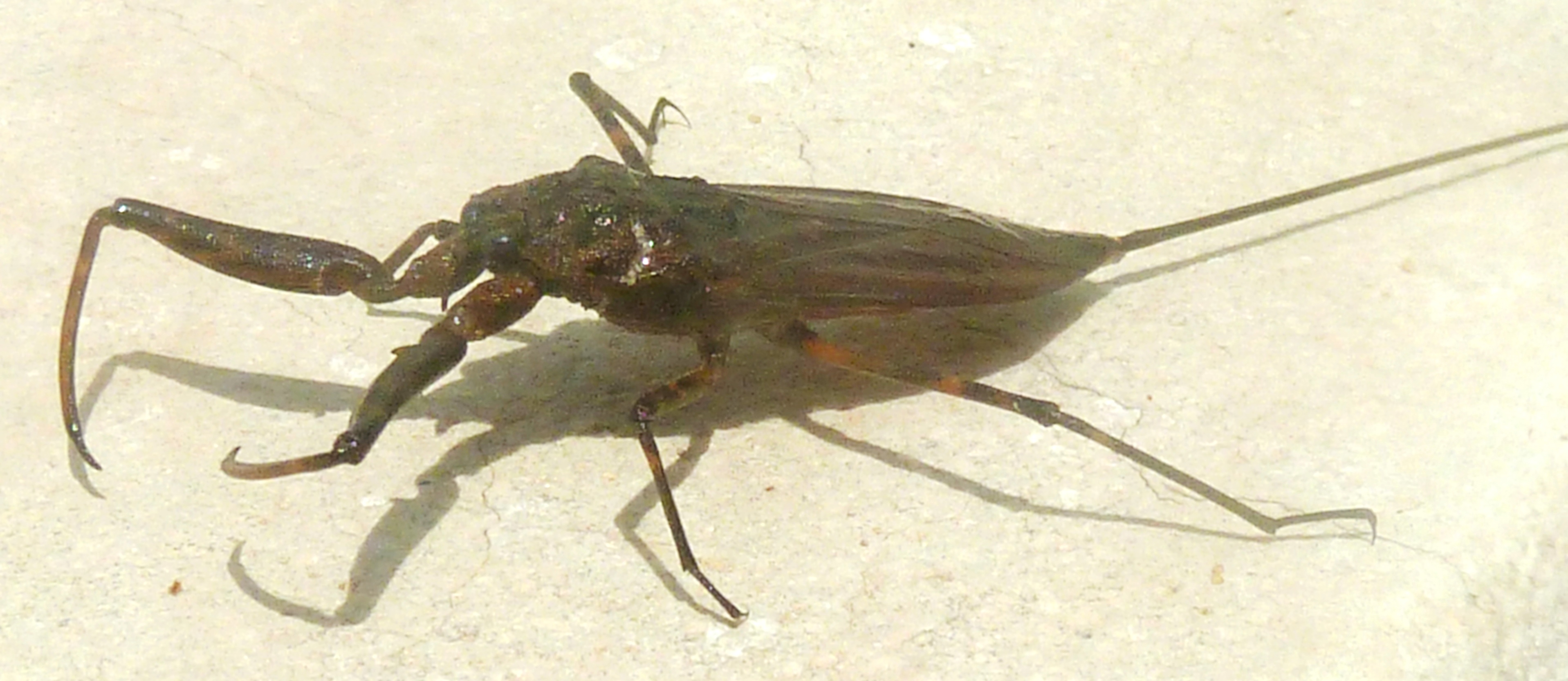
Laccotrephes species in South Africa

They are dark brown to rufous brown, elongate and flattened, aquatic insects with hooked raptorial forelegs and a long, thin tube (or siphon) protruding from the tip of the abdomen. The respiratory siphon consists of two filaments which are extensions of the eighth abdominal tergum. These in unison form an air duct which takes in air from above the water surface (similar to a snorkel). Air is fed via the tracheal system and spiracles on the dorsum of the first abdominal segment to an air store under the elytra.

== Populations ==
The genus contains two distinguishable assemblages, with respectively Afrotropical and Indomalayan-Australasian centers of diversity. The two assemblages overlap only in Iran. Morphology of the male paramere is important in distinguishing species.

== Species ==
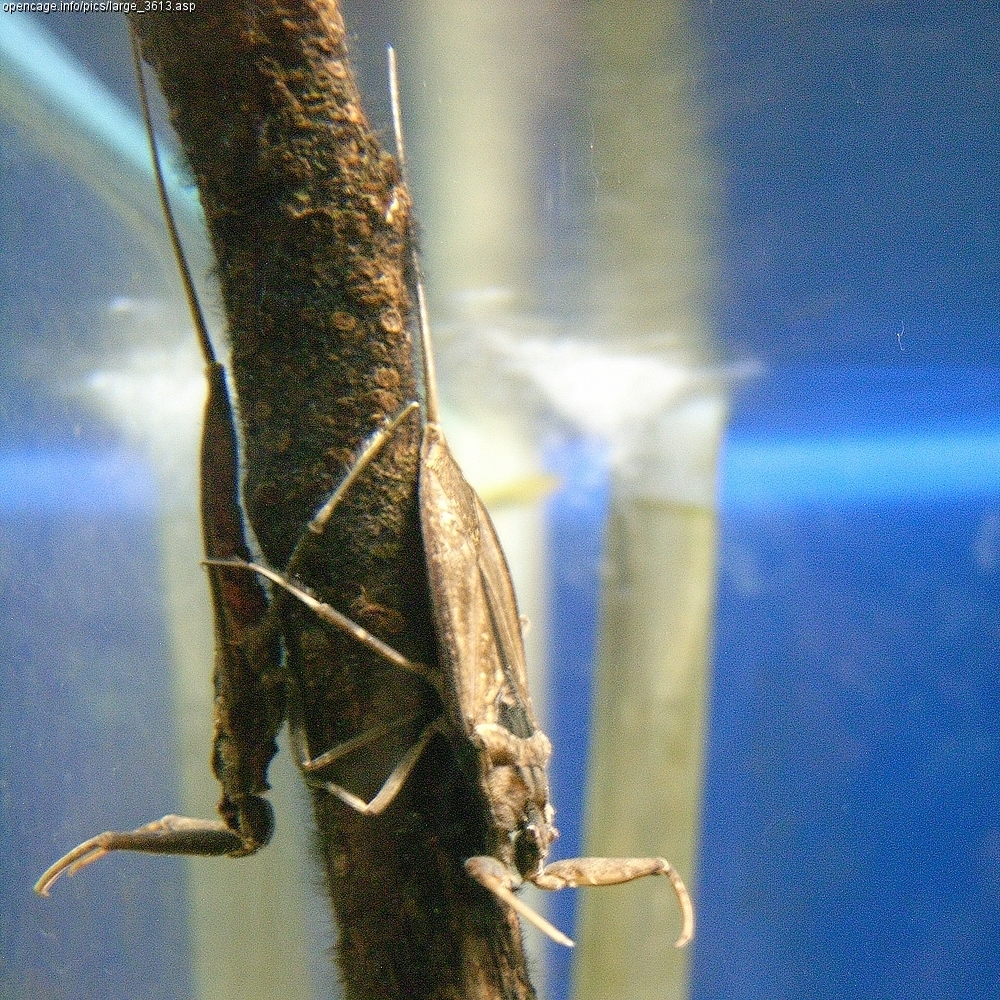
Two Laccotrephes japonensis

The following are included in BioLib.cz:

- Laccotrephes ampliatus (Montandon, 1895)
- Laccotrephes annulipes (Laporte in Silbermann, 1833)
- Laccotrephes archipelagi (Ferrari, 1888)
- Laccotrephes armatus Montandon, 1898
- Laccotrephes armipes Montandon, 1909
- Laccotrephes ater (Linnaeus, 1767)
- Laccotrephes basilewskyi Poisson, 1955
- Laccotrephes biei Poisson, 1954
- Laccotrephes biimpresus Montandon, 1913
- Laccotrephes bokumai Poisson, 1960
- Laccotrephes brachialis Gerstaecker, 1873 – Africa
- Laccotrephes breddini Montandon, 1913
- Laccotrephes brevicaudatus Poisson, 1954
- Laccotrephes calcar Distant, 1904
- Laccotrephes calcaratus Montandon, 1898
- Laccotrephes celebensis Polhemus & Keffer, 1999 – Sulawesi
- Laccotrephes chinensis (Hoffmann, 1925)
- Laccotrephes collarti Poisson, 1940
- Laccotrephes dentatus (Ferrari, 1888)
- Laccotrephes depressus (Montandon, 1895)
- Laccotrephes dilatatus (Montandon, 1895)
- Laccotrephes dipidii Poisson, 1954
- Laccotrephes dissimulatus Montandon, 1912 – Africa
- Laccotrephes dubia Ferrari, 1888
- Laccotrephes ellipticus Gerstaecker, 1892
- Laccotrephes elongatus Montandon, 1907
- Laccotrephes erekhtheus Linnavuori, 1971
- Laccotrephes eusoma (Ferrari, 1888)
- Laccotrephes fabricii Stål, 1868 – Africa
- Laccotrephes flavovenosa (Dohrn, 1860)
- Laccotrephes fuscus (Linnaeus, 1758)
- Laccotrephes gomai Poisson, 1960
- Laccotrephes griseus (Gúerin-Méneville, 1835)
- Laccotrephes grossus (Fabricius, 1787)
- Laccotrephes hyperion Linnavuori, 1971
- Laccotrephes ingens Ferrari, 1888
- †Laccotrephes incertus Popov, 1971
- Laccotrephes irresectus Montandon, 1914
- Laccotrephes japonensis Scott, 1874
- Laccotrephes kabarei Poisson, 1960
- Laccotrephes kafakumbai Poisson, 1957
- Laccotrephes kahuzii Poisson, 1960
- Laccotrephes kakyeloi Poisson, 1957
- Laccotrephes katekei Poisson, 1954
- Laccotrephes kazibae Poisson, 1954
- Laccotrephes keilak Linnavuori, 1971
- Laccotrephes latimanus Montandon, 1909
- Laccotrephes limosoides Poisson, 1954
- Laccotrephes limosus Stål, 1865
- Laccotrephes longicaudatus Nieser, Zettel & Chen, 2009
- Laccotrephes lupialae Poisson, 1954
- Laccotrephes maculatus (Fabricius, 1775)
- Laccotrephes mancinii Poisson, 1957
- Laccotrephes masombwei Poisson, 1954
- Laccotrephes mozambica Poisson, 1954
- Laccotrephes niala Linnavuori, 1981
- Laccotrephes occultus Lundblad, 1933
- Laccotrephes oculatus Montandon, 1898
- Laccotrephes overlaeti Poisson, 1957
- Laccotrephes palestinensis Nieser, Chen & Guilbert, 2009
- Laccotrephes papuus Montandon, 1900
- Laccotrephes pfeiferiae (Ferrari, 1888) – Southeast Asia
- Laccotrephes pseudoampliatus Poisson, 1956
- Laccotrephes pseudoater Poisson, 1954
- Laccotrephes robustior Zettel, 2008
- Laccotrephes robustus Stal, 1871
- Laccotrephes ruber (Linnaeus, 1764)
- Laccotrephes simulatus Montandon, 1913
- Laccotrephes sondaicus J. Polhemus & Keffer, 1999 – Sumbawa and Flores
- Laccotrephes steindachneri (Ferrari, 1888)
- Laccotrephes tristis (Stål, 1854) – Australia
- Laccotrephes vicinus (Signoret, 1863) – Africa
