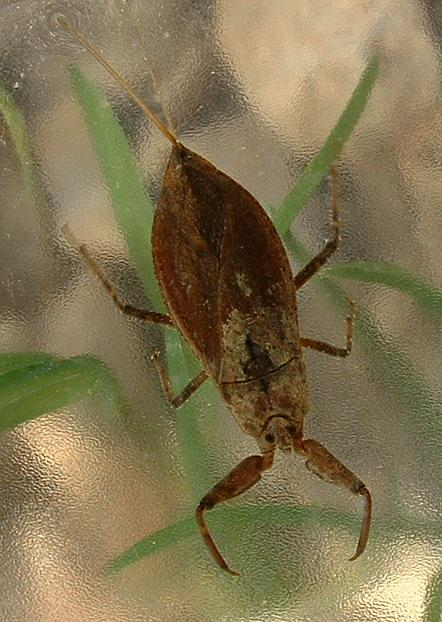
- Nepa cinerea

Scientific classification
- Domain: Eukaryota
- Kingdom: Animalia
- Phylum: Arthropoda
- Class: Insecta
- Order: Hemiptera
- Suborder: Heteroptera
- Family: Nepidae
- Subfamily: Nepinae
- Genus: Nepa; Linnaeus, 1758

Synonyms
- Hepa Geoffroy, 1762; Hepa Fourcroy, 1785; Neparia Rafinesque, 1815; Nepa Agassiz, 1846

= Nepa (bug) =

Genus of true bugs

Nepa is a genus belonging to the family Nepidae, known as water scorpions. Species are found in freshwater habitats in the Northern Hemisphere.

They are oval-bodied, aquatic insects with raptorial front legs. Like other members of the Nepidae, they have a pair of nonretractable cerci-like breathing tubes on the terminal abdominal segment, a characteristic which readily distinguishes them from the Belostomatidae. Their primary staples are other insects and small aquatic vertebrates. They can inflict a painful bite when handled.

== Etymology ==
'Nepa' is a classical Latin word for a 'scorpion' or 'crab'.

== Species ==
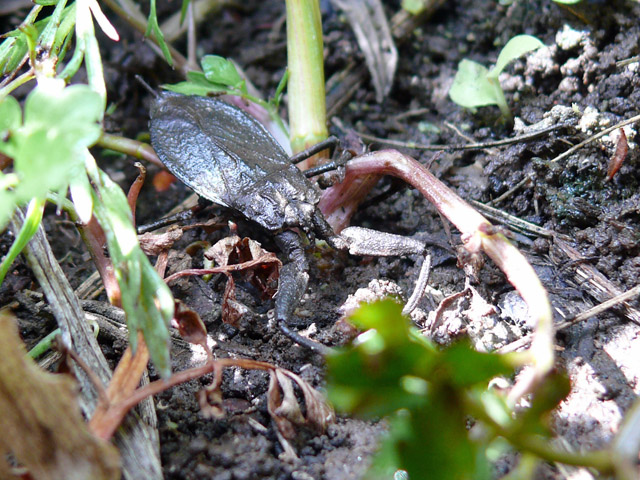
N. hoffmanni is found in northeastern Asia

The following species are included in Nepa:

1. Nepa anophthalma Decu et al., 1994 (see Movile Cave)
2. Nepa apiculata Uhler, 1862
3. Nepa cinerea Linnaeus, 1758 - type species
4. Nepa dollfusi Esaki, 1928
5. Nepa grandis Linnæus, 1758
6. Nepa hoffmanni Esaki, 1925
7. Nepa monteilsensis Nel, 1988
8. Nepa plana Sulzer, 1776
9. Nepa remyi Poisson, 1961
10. Nepa rubra Linnaeus, 1758
11. Nepa rustica Fabricius, 1775
12. Nepa sardiniensis Hungerford, 1928
13. Nepa seurati Bergevin, 1926

Among these, the type species N. cinerea of Europe, northern Africa and northern Asia and N. apiculata of eastern North American (Canada and United States), are widespread. The remaining have restricted ranges in Corsica, Sardinia, Romania, Morocco and northeastern Asia. One of these, N. anophthalma, is the only cave-adapted species in the family Nepidae, found in Movile Cave.

Linnaeus listed a number of additional species in his description of the genus, most of which either are considered synonyms or have been moved to other genera.
