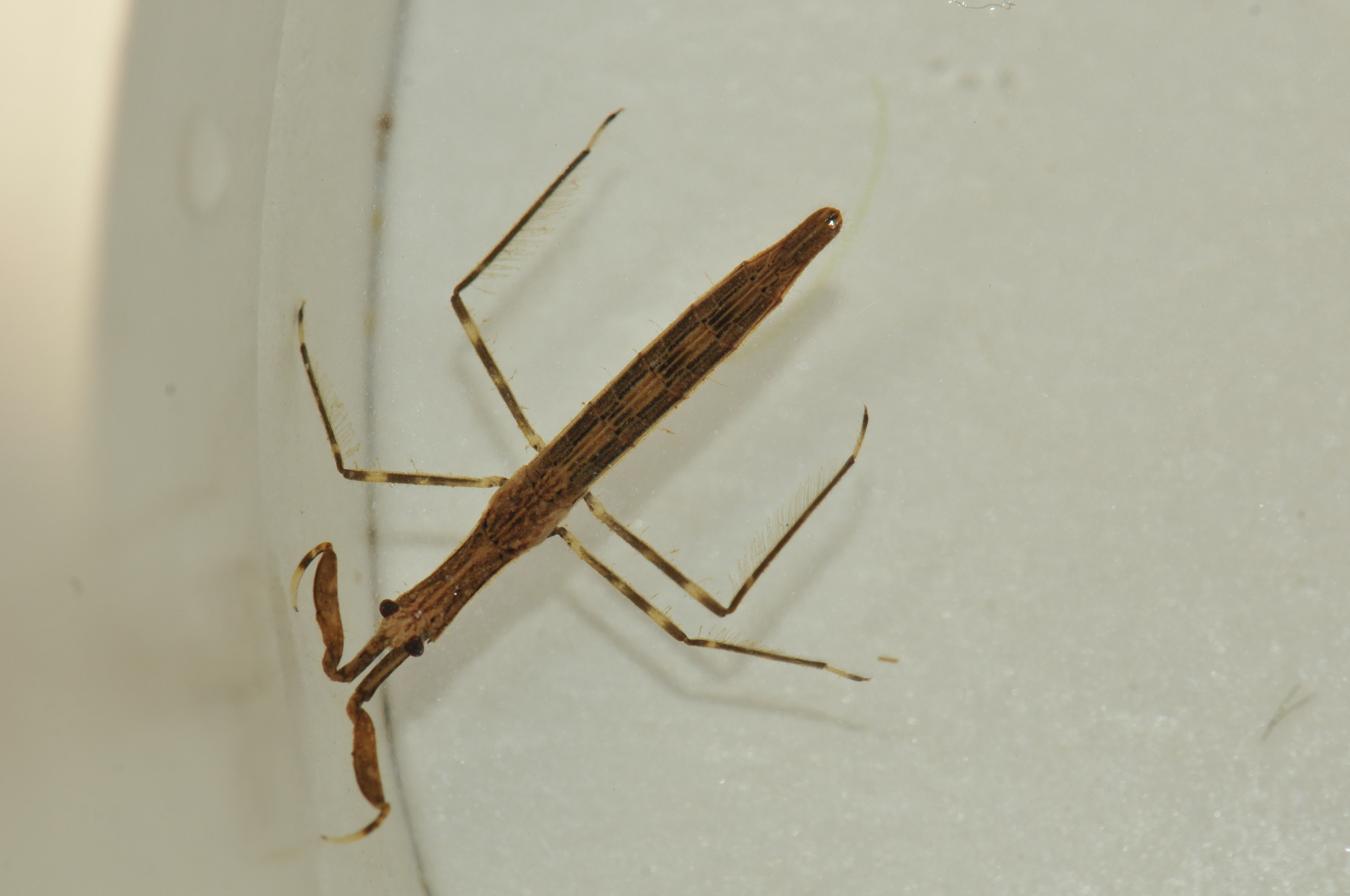
- Cercotmetus brevipes

Scientific classification
- Domain: Eukaryota
- Kingdom: Animalia
- Phylum: Arthropoda
- Class: Insecta
- Order: Hemiptera
- Suborder: Heteroptera
- Superfamily: Nepoidea
- Family: Nepidae
- Subfamily: Ranatrinae
- Genus: Cercotmetus; Amyot & Serville, 1843

= Cercotmetus =

Genus of true bugs

External image
- Images at iNaturalist

Cercotmetus is a genus of water bugs in the subfamily Ranatrinae ("water stick-insects"). The recorded distribution of this genus is from is from mainland Asia to New Guinea and northern Australia.

== Description ==
Cercotmetus species are similar to the related genus Ranatra, but have distinctly shorter respiratory siphons (posterior breathing tubes, which are ¼ or less of the body length) and the front femur is shorter than length of the pronotum.

== Species ==
The Global Biodiversity Information Facility lists:

1. Cercotmetus asiaticus Amyot & Serville, 1843 - type species
2. Cercotmetus brevipes Montandon, 1909
3. Cercotmetus compositus Montandon, 1903
4. Cercotmetus dissidens Montandon, 1911
5. Cercotmetus fumosus Distant, 1904
6. Cercotmetus horni Montandon, 1911
7. Cercotmetus minutus Keffer & J.Polhemus, 1999
8. Cercotmetus pilipes (Dallas, 1850)
9. Cercotmetus robustus Montandon, 1911
10. Cercotmetus strangulatus Montandon, 1911
