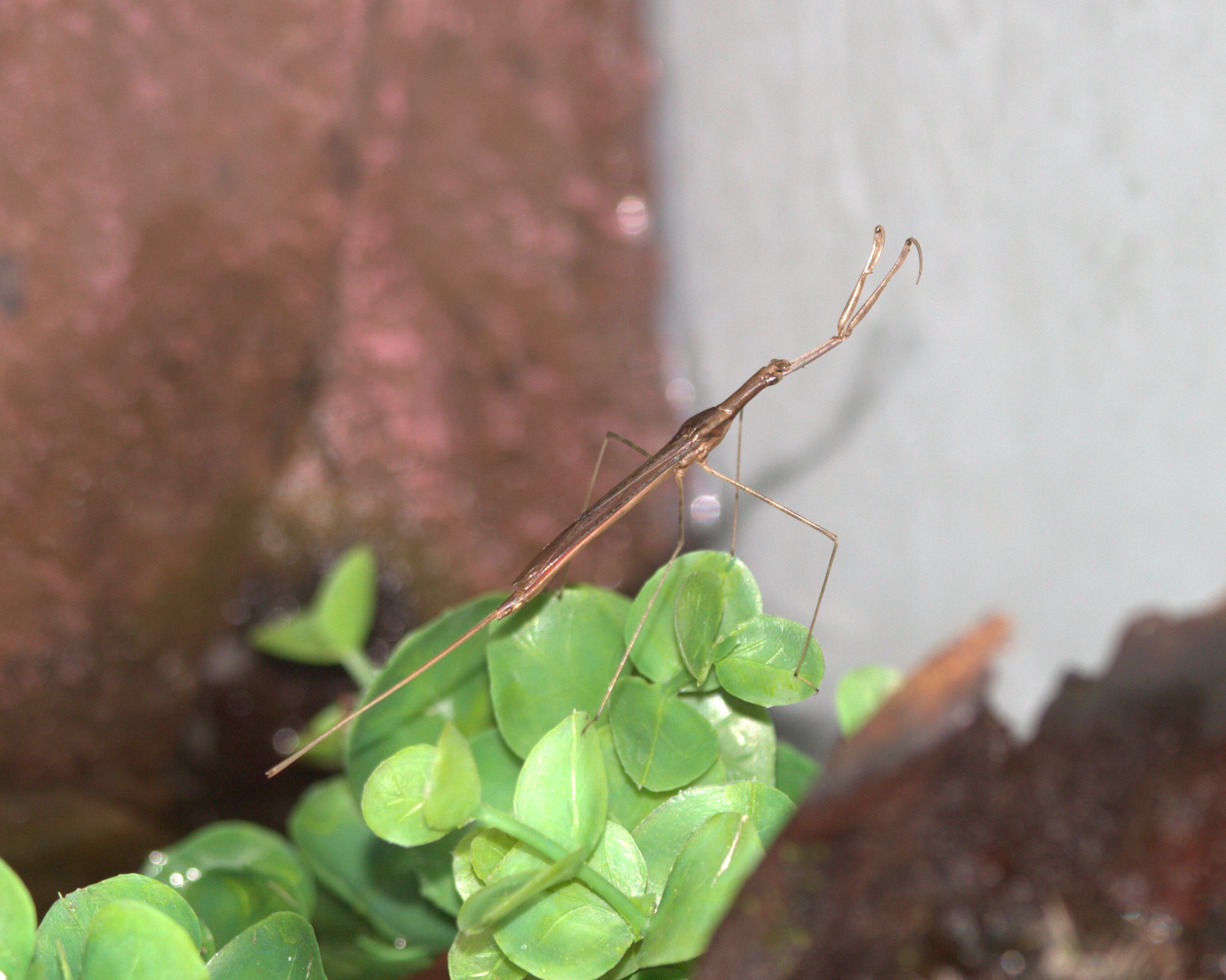
- At Cincinnati Zoo

Scientific classification
- Domain: Eukaryota
- Kingdom: Animalia
- Phylum: Arthropoda
- Class: Insecta
- Order: Hemiptera
- Suborder: Heteroptera
- Family: Nepidae
- Genus: Ranatra
- Species: R. fusca

Binomial name
- Ranatra fusca Palisot de Beauvois, 1820

= Ranatra fusca =

Species of true bug

Ranatra fusca is a water stick-insect in the family Nepidae, native to North America. It is known by the common name brown water scorpion. It is generally 3.2–4.2 cm (1.3–1.7 in) long. They are carnivorous and feed on other insects and crustaceans. They are most common from spring to autumn.
