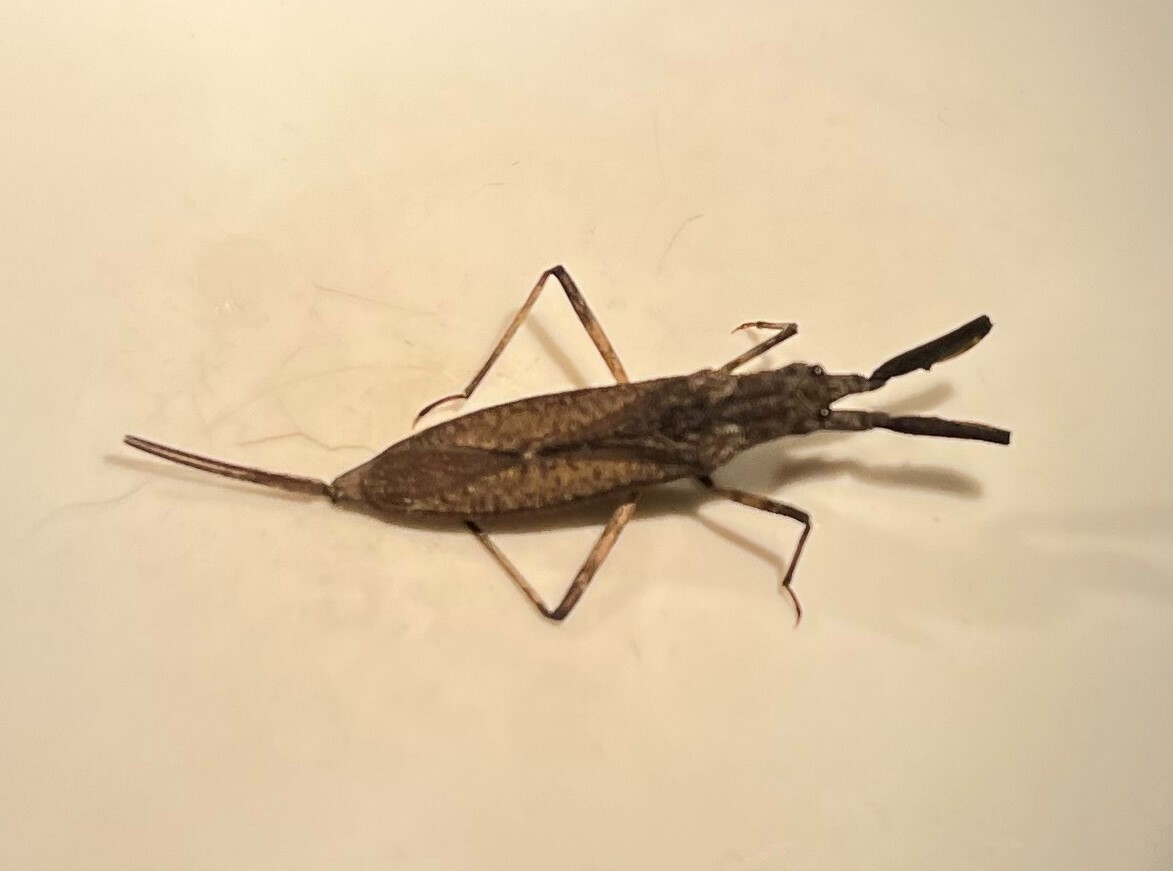

Scientific classification
- Kingdom: Animalia
- Phylum: Arthropoda
- Clade: Pancrustacea
- Class: Insecta
- Order: Hemiptera
- Suborder: Heteroptera
- Family: Nepidae
- Subfamily: Nepinae
- Genus: Curicta; Stål, 1861

= Curicta (bug) =

Genus of true bugs

Curicta is a genus of waterscorpions in the family Nepidae native to freshwater habitats in the Americas. There are more than 15 species, with most restricted to South America. There are only two species in the United States: C. pronotata (Arizona to Texas) and C. scorpio (Louisiana and Texas).

== Species ==
There are more than 15 species in the genus Curicta, including:

- Curicta montei De Carlo, 1960^{g}
- Curicta pronotata Kuitert, 1949^{i c g b}
- Curicta scorpio Stål, 1862^{i c g b}

Data sources: i = ITIS, c = Catalogue of Life, g = GBIF, b = Bugguide.net
