= Siphon (insect anatomy) =

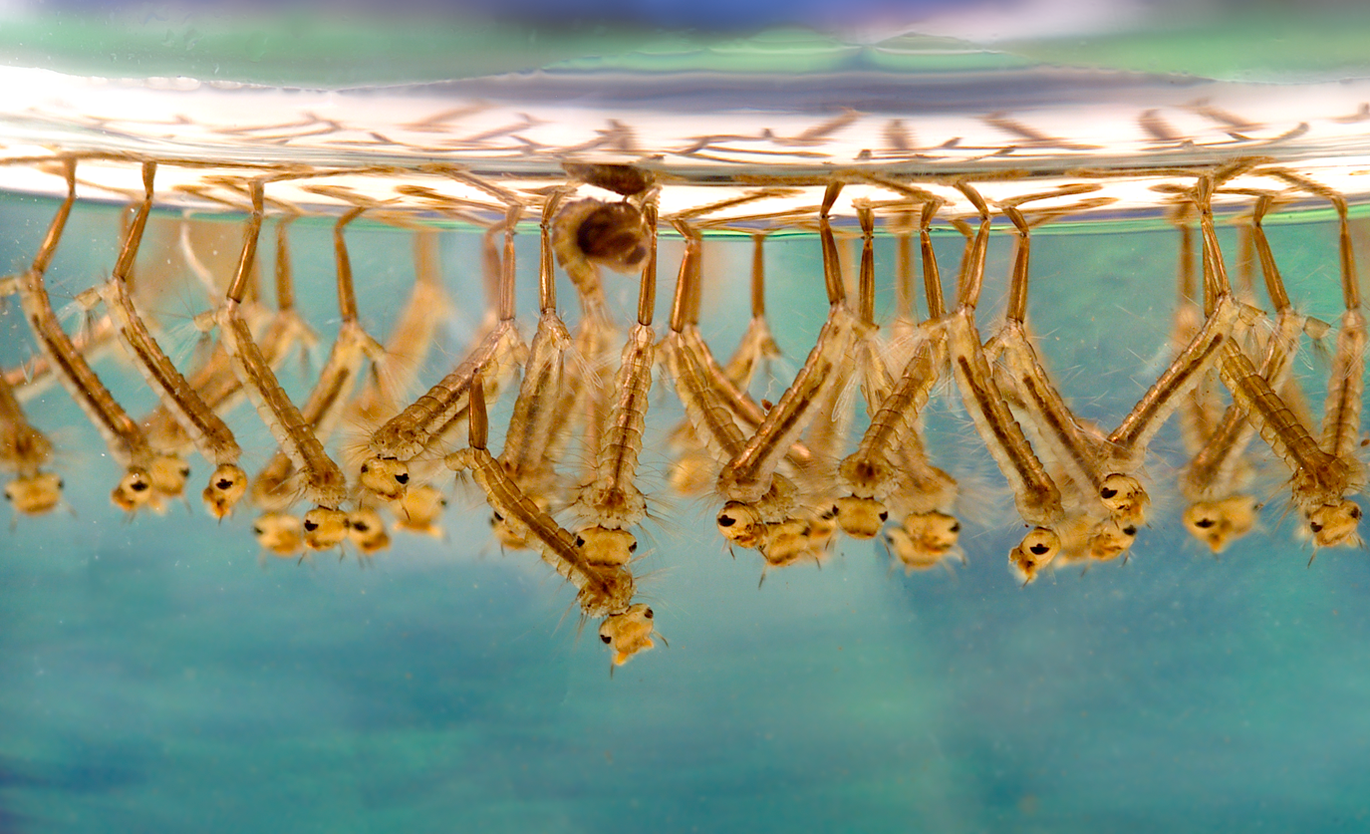
Mosquito larvae breathing, siphons up

A siphon is a tubular organ of the respiratory system of some insects that spend a significant amount of their time underwater, that serves as a breathing tube. The larvae of several kinds of insects, including mosquitoes, tabanid flies, and Belostomatidae, live in the water and breathe through a siphon.

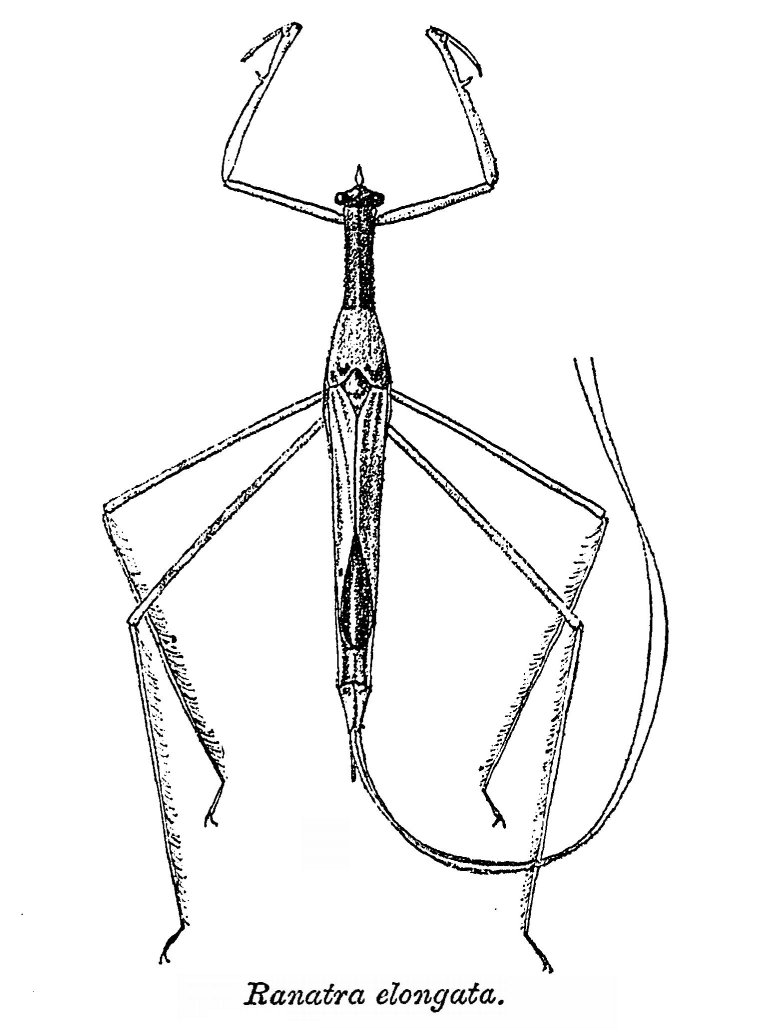
Water scorpion Ranatra elongata

Some adult insects which spend considerable time underwater have an abdominal breathing tube. For example, adult water scorpions have the caudal process which consists of a pair of half-tubes capable of being locked together to form a siphon by means of which air is conducted to the tracheae at the apex of the abdomen when the tip of the tube is thrust above the surface of the water. In immature forms the siphon is undeveloped and breathing takes place through abdominal spiracles.
