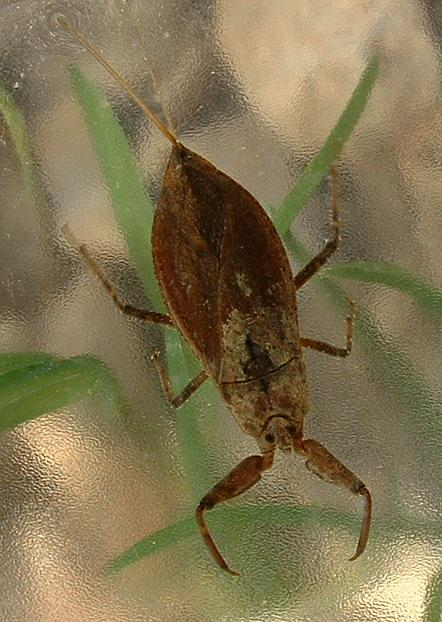
- Nepa cinerea
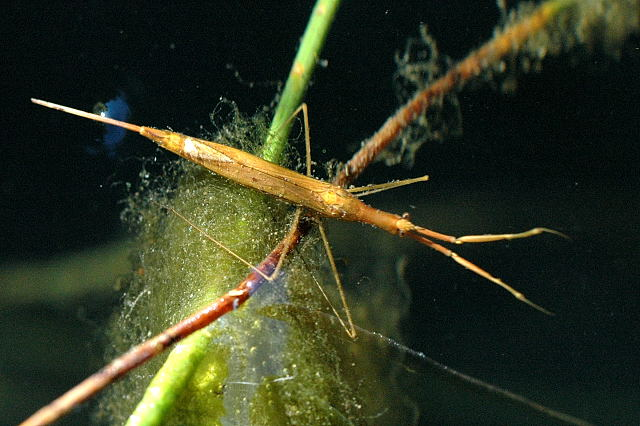
- Ranatra linearis

Scientific classification
- Kingdom: Animalia
- Phylum: Arthropoda
- Class: Insecta
- Order: Hemiptera
- Suborder: Heteroptera
- Infraorder: Nepomorpha
- Superfamily: Nepoidea
- Family: Nepidae; Latreille 1802

Subfamilies and genera
- See text

= Nepidae =

Nepidae Temporal range: Aptian–Recent

Family of true bugs

Nepidae is a family of exclusively aquatic Heteropteran insects in the order Hemiptera. They are commonly called water scorpions for their superficial resemblance to scorpions, due to their raptorial forelegs and the presence of a long slender process at the posterior end of the abdomen, resembling a tail. There are 14 genera in the family, in two subfamilies, Nepinae and Ranatrinae. Members of the genus Ranatra, the most widespread and species-rich genus, are sometimes called needle bugs or water stick insects as they are slenderer than Nepa.

While water scorpions do not sting with their tail (it is used for breathing), they do have a painful bite (strictly speaking a sting by their pointed proboscis), but this is much less harmful to humans than a true scorpion's sting.

== Distribution and habitat ==
Nepidae are found on all continents except Antarctica. They mostly inhabit stagnant or slow-moving freshwater habitats like ponds, marshes, canals and streams. Exceptionally they have also been recorded from hypersaline lakes and brackish lagoons, the Australian genus Goondnomdanepa is restricted to flowing waters, and Nepa anophthalma is adapted to life in caves in Romania.

== Taxonomy ==
Nepidae has around 250 species in 14 genera divided into two subfamilies, Nepinae and Ranatrinae.

Among these the most diverse are the widespread Ranatra (about 100 species) and Laccotrephes (about 60), but the family also includes species-poor genera, like the Ethiopian Borborophilus, Nepella, Nepitella and Paranepa (each with one species), Indian Montonepa (one species), Philippine Borborophyes (one species), and Australian Austronepa (one species) and Goondnomdanepa (three species).

The subfamily Ranatrinae are sometimes called "water stick insects". Genera in this subfamily include: Austronepa and Goondnomdanepa are restricted to Australia. Cercotmetus is from Asia to northern Australia and resembles Ranatra (Worldwide distribution), although the former has a distinctly shorter siphon.

The subfamily Nepinae are sometimes called "water scorpions".

=== Fossil record ===
†Araripenepa from the Early Cretaceous (Aptian) Crato Formation of Brazil is the oldest known member of the family, and is the sister group to remaining genera.

=== Genera ===
Subfamily	Tribe	Genus	Image
Ranatrinae Douglas & Scott, 1865	Austronepini Menke and Stange, 1964	Austronepa Menke & Stange, 1964	
Ranatrinae Douglas & Scott, 1865	Goondnomdanepini Lansbury, 1974	Goondnomdanepa Lansbury, 1974	
Ranatrinae Douglas & Scott, 1865	Ranatrini Douglas and Scott, 1865	Cercotmetus Amyot & Serville, 1843	
Ranatrinae Douglas & Scott, 1865	Ranatrini Douglas and Scott, 1865	Ranatra Fabricius, 1790	
Nepinae Latreille, 1802	Nepini Latreille, 1802	Borborophilus Stål, 1865	
Nepinae Latreille, 1802	Nepini Latreille, 1802	Borborophyes Stål, 1870	
Nepinae Latreille, 1802	Nepini Latreille, 1802	Laccotrephes Stål, 1865	
Nepinae Latreille, 1802	Nepini Latreille, 1802	Montonepa Lansbury, 1973	
Nepinae Latreille, 1802	Nepini Latreille, 1802	Nepa Linnaeus, 1758	
Nepinae Latreille, 1802	Nepini Latreille, 1802	Nepella Poisson, 1947	
Nepinae Latreille, 1802	Nepini Latreille, 1802	Nepitella (syn. Nepita) Stys and Jansson, 1988	
Nepinae Latreille, 1802	Nepini Latreille, 1802	Paranepa Poisson, 1965	
Nepinae Latreille, 1802	Nepini Latreille, 1802	Telmatotrephes Stål, 1854	
Nepinae Latreille, 1802	Curictini Menke and Stange, 1964	Curicta Stål, 1861	

== Appearance and ecology ==
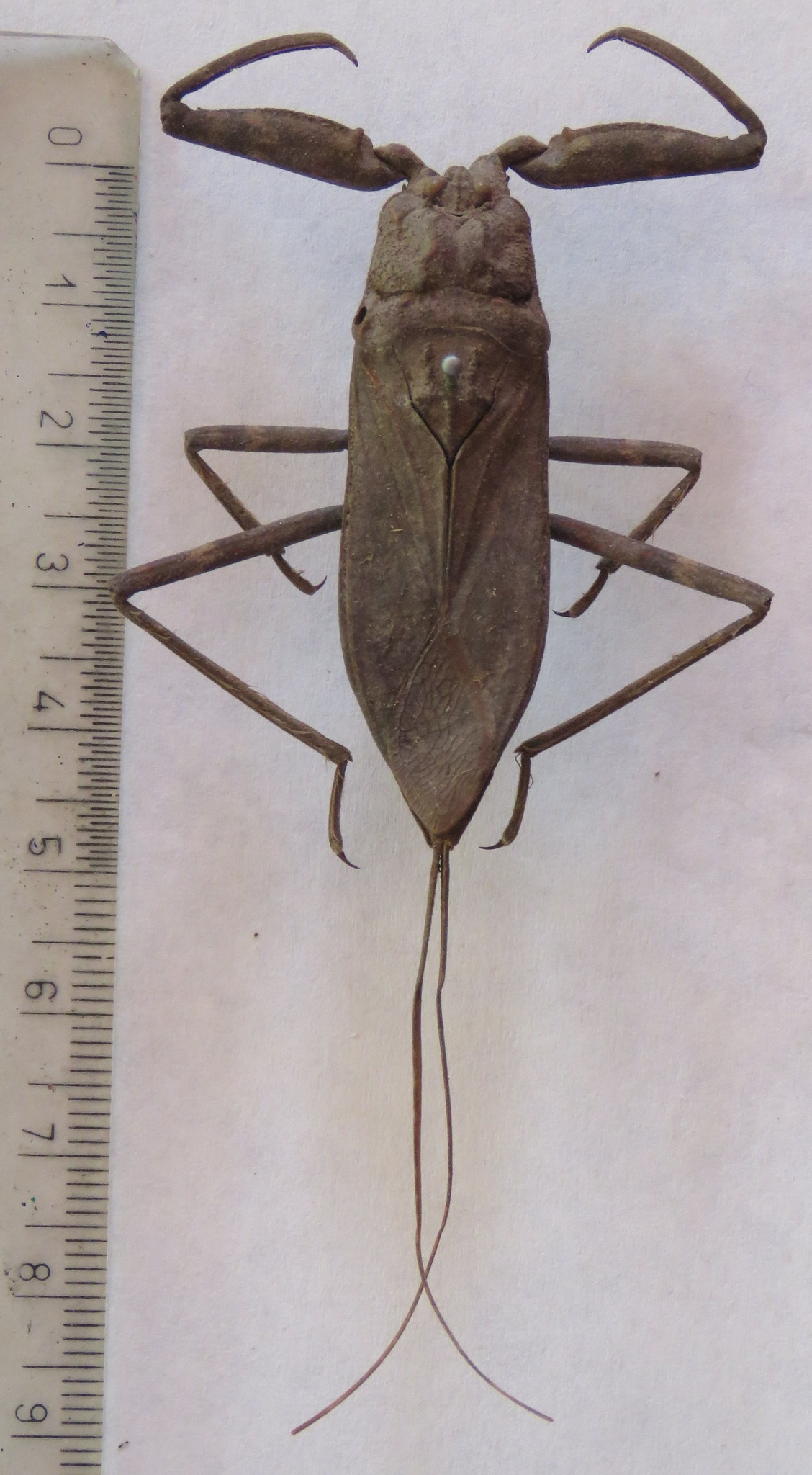
Laccotrephes fuscus

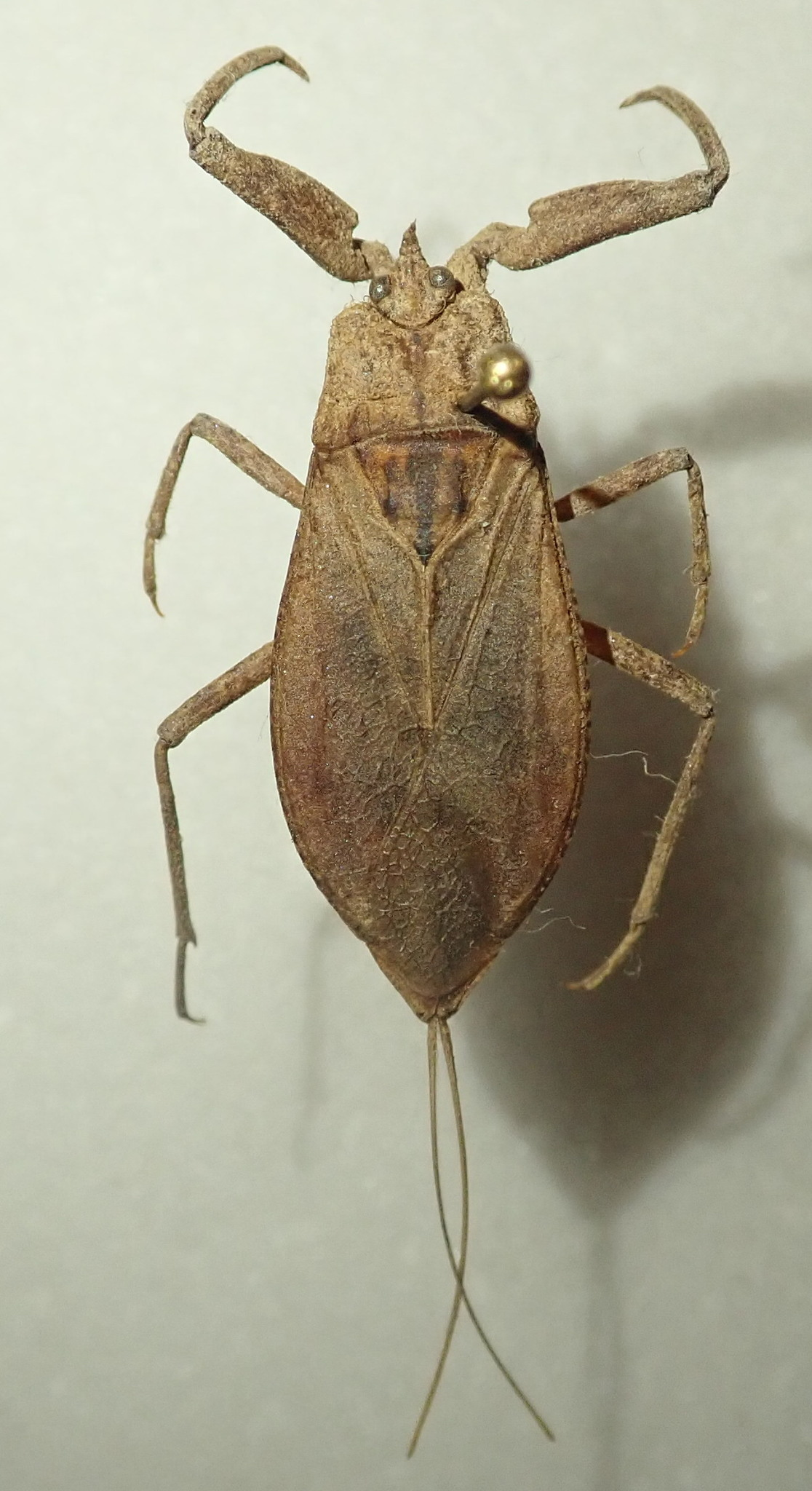
Nepa cinerea

Nepidae are brown insects, but some species have a bright red abdomen that can be seen when the wings are open. Their body is broad and flat (subfamily Nepinae) or long and thin (subfamily Ranatrinae). They are rather poor swimmers and typically crawl about on aquatic vegetation. They can fly, but this is infrequently seen. In most species the body is between 1.5 and 4.5 cm (0.6–1.8 in) long, although the largest such as the East Asian Ranatra chinensis and South American R. magna can approach 6 cm (2.4 in).

Nepa cinerea walking on land

Respiration in the adult is achieved by means of the caudal process, which consists of a pair of half-tubes capable of being locked together to form a siphon. Air is conducted through it to the tracheae at the apex of the abdomen when the tip of the tube is thrust above the surface of the water (similar to a snorkel). In some species the siphon is longer than the body, but in others it is shorter, in a few even less than one-tenth of the body length. In immature forms the siphon is often underdeveloped and respiration takes place through six pairs of abdominal spiracles.

To keep their orientation in the water they have three pairs of “static sense organs”, small oval structures closely associated with the fourth, fifth, and sixth abdominal spiracles.

Their frontal legs are modified into raptorial appendages that are used to grab their prey. They feed primarily on aquatic invertebrates such as other insects, but occasionally take small fish or tadpoles. The eggs, which are laid above the waterline in mud, decomposing vegetation, the stems of plants or rotting wood, are supplied with air by filamentous processes which vary in number among the genera.

== Gallery ==
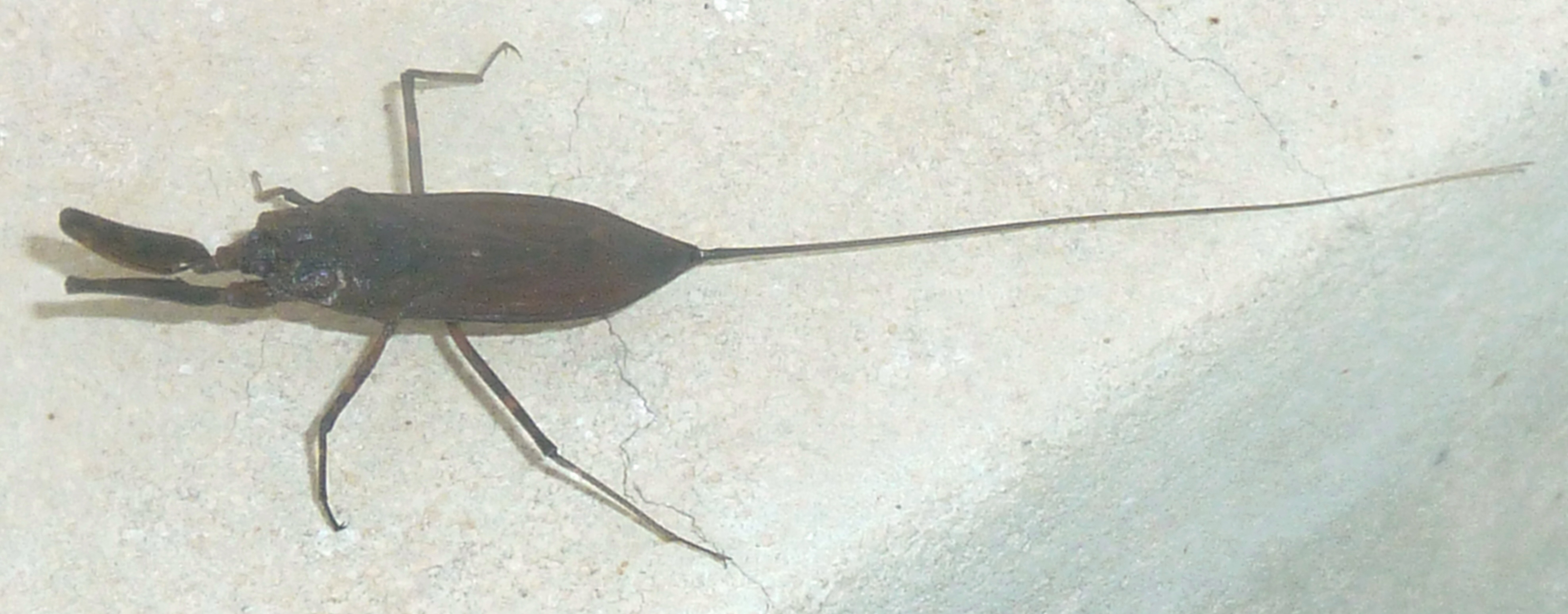
Nepidae have a tail-like siphon or breathing tube, which in some species like this Laccotrephes can be even longer than the body

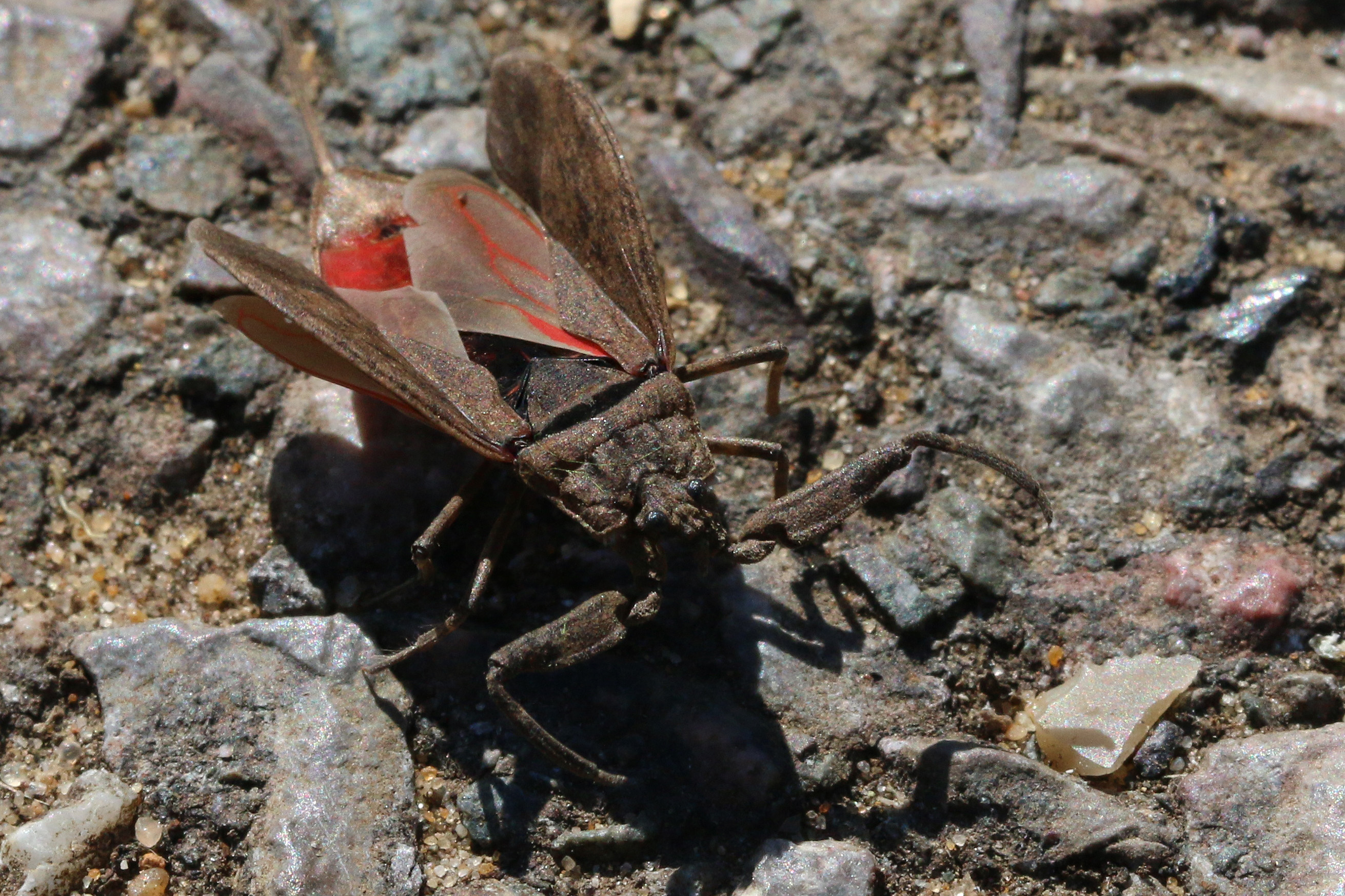
Nepa cinerea with open forewings, revealing its usually hidden hindwings and red abdomen

== See also ==
- Eurypterid: unrelated, extinct arthropods that are commonly called sea scorpions
