= Movile Cave =

Cave in Constanța County, Romania

- Romanian: Peștera Movile
- Interactive map of Movile Cave
- Location: Near Mangalia, Constanța County, Romania
- Coordinates: 43.825694°N 28.560556°E
- Discovery: 1986
- Entrances: 1 (artificial)
- Hazards: Hypoxic atmosphere, with dangerous levels of carbon dioxide, hydrogen sulfide, and ammonia
- Features: Naturally sealed cave containing unique ecosystem supported by chemosynthesis

Movile Cave (Romanian: Peștera Movile) is a cave near Mangalia, Constanța County, Romania discovered in 1986 by Cristian Lascu during construction work a few kilometers from the Black Sea coast. It is notable for its unique subterranean groundwater ecosystem abundant in hydrogen sulfide and carbon dioxide, but low in oxygen. Life in the cave has been separated from the outside for the past 5.5 million years and it is based completely on chemosynthesis. Due to its extreme environment, access to Movile Cave is strictly controlled, and a limited number of researchers have permission to study its conditions.

Location of Movile Cave within Europe
Location of Movile Cave within Romania

Similar caves where life partly or fully depends on chemosynthesis have been found in Ein-Nur Cave and Ayalon Cave (Israel), Frasassi Caves (Italy), Melissotrypa Cave (Elassona municipality, Greece), Tashan Cave (Iran), caves in the Sharo-Argun Valley in the Caucasus Mountains, Lower Kane Cave and Cesspool Cave (Wyoming and Alleghany County, VA, USA), and Villa Luz Cave (Mexico).

== Description ==
Movile Cave is a network of paths in limestone that are approximately 200 metres (660 ft) long, with portions that are partially or fully submerged by hydrothermal waters. The temperature of the air and water is a constant 21 °C (70 °F) and the relative humidity is about 100%. Access to the cave is limited to a few researchers per year, to minimize external impact on the delicate ecosystem.

The air in the cave is extremely different from the outer atmosphere. The level of oxygen is only a third to half of the concentration found in open air (7–10% O_{2} in the cave atmosphere, compared to 21% O_{2} in air), and about 100 times more carbon dioxide (2–3.5% CO_{2} in the cave atmosphere, versus 0.04% CO_{2} in air). It also contains 1–2% methane (CH_{4}) and both the air and waters of the cave contain high concentrations of hydrogen sulfide (H_{2}S) and ammonia (NH_{3}). The lake waters only contain as little as 9–16 μM dissolved oxygen at the surface; <1 μM below 3–4 cm. As depth increases in the lake, the water becomes completely anoxic.

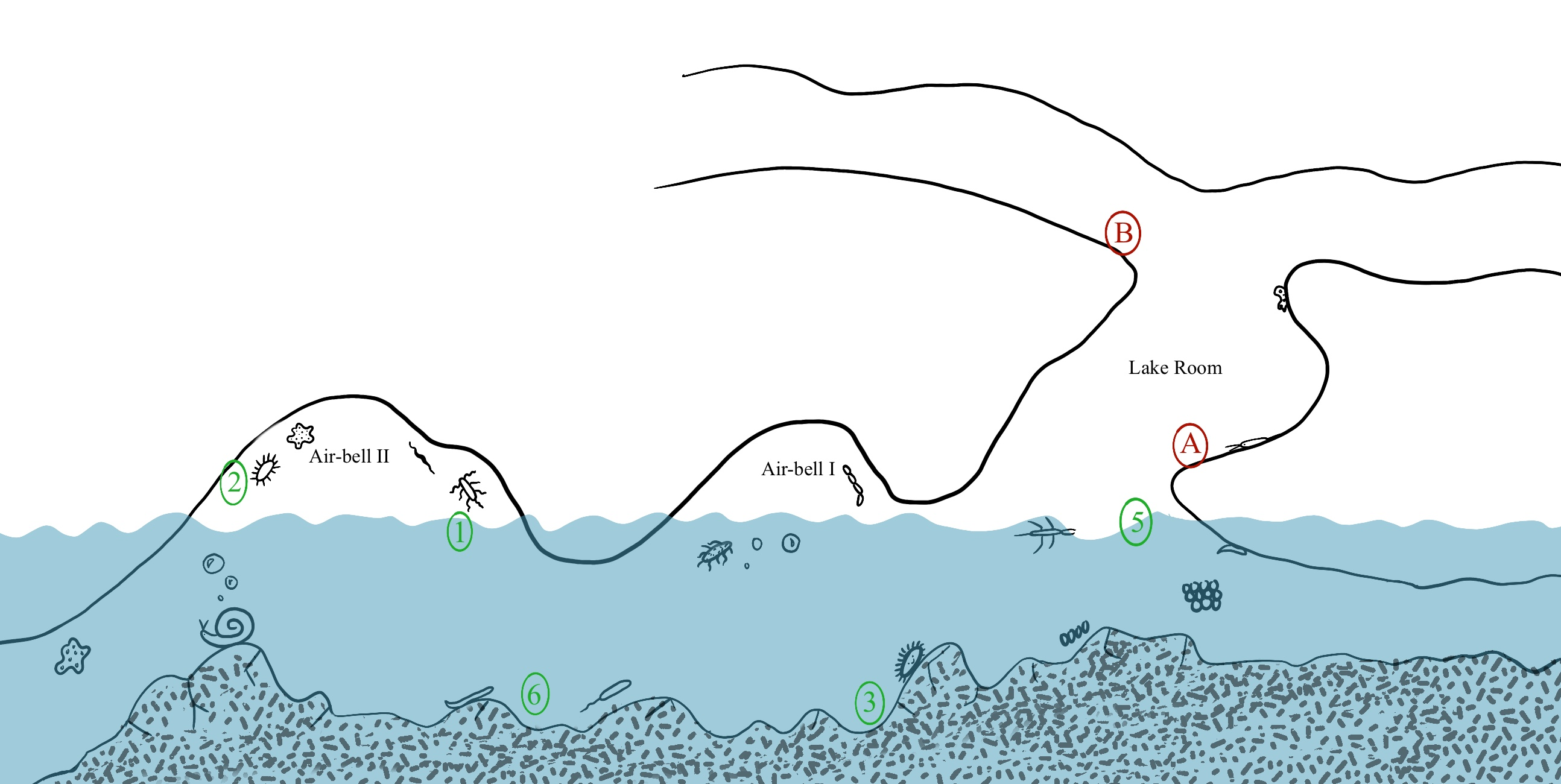
Schematic illustration of Movile Cave. Numbers in green indicate sampling sites from Aerts et al. (2023), while letters in red represent sampling sites from Chicludean et al. (2022).

== Biogeochemical cycling ==
Movile Cave is chemically characterized by high concentrations of sulfide, with levels reaching up to 500 μM. This highly anaerobic, sulfur-rich environment shares several similarities with deep-sea hydrothermal vents, where sulfur oxidation plays a central role in energy production. The cave's biochemical processes are driven by aerobic elemental sulfur-oxidizing bacteria, which serve as the primary producers of biomass for the ecosystem.

Though they are less abundant, methylotrophs and diazotrophs are also important primary producers that feed on methane and contribute to the cave's carbon and nitrogen cycling.

== Geology ==
Movile Cave is classified as a karst cave that formed through weathering and dissolution of carbonate rocks in view of acidic groundwater over millennia. A term for this is hypogene speleogenesis, which would allow the formation of an entire system of caves isolated from surface influences for about 5.5 million years. Most caves have at least some surface exposure, but Movile Cave is sealed, establishing an extreme but stable ecosystem. Such geological isolation is what sustains a chemosynthesis-based ecosystem, which is unique.

== Biology ==
Movile Cave supports a complex ecosystem built upon chemosynthetic bacteria. These bacteria derive energy from oxidizing hydrogen sulfide and methane, forming the base of the food web. This makes the cave one of the few known ecosystems that do not rely on sunlight as a source of primary production. Similar chemosynthetic ecosystems have been found in Ayalon Cave and Villa Luz Cave.

The cave is known to contain 57 animal species, among them leeches, spiders, pseudoscorpions, woodlice, centipedes (Cryptops speleorex), water scorpions (Nepa anophthalma), and also snails. Of these, 37 are endemic. While animals have lived in the cave for 5.5 million years, not all of them arrived simultaneously. One of the most recent animals recorded is the cave's only species of snail, Heleobia dobrogica, which has inhabited the cave for slightly more than 2 million years.

=== Adaptations to extreme environment ===
The organisms within Movile Cave have gained unique adaptations in order to survive its extreme chemosynthetic environment. Many of these species lack functional eyes, as vision is not necessary in complete darkness. As a replacement, many species develop enhanced mechanosensory and chemosensory awareness that enables species to detect food and move in the darkness.

Due to the high concentration of toxic gases, many organisms have developed physiological mechanisms in order to tolerate the elevated carbon dioxide and hydrogen sulfide levels. Some species exhibit specialized respiratory adaptations that increase the efficiency of oxygen extraction from the cave's low oxygen atmosphere.

=== Key species and food web ===
Among the key species found in Movile Cave are leeches, troglobitic (species that only live in caves and have fully adapted to it) centipedes, and cave-adapted spiders. Many of these organisms are reliant on the microbial production of chemosynthetic bacteria, with grazers feeding on bacterial biofilms and higher level consumers preying on the primary consumers.

==== Aquatic fauna ====
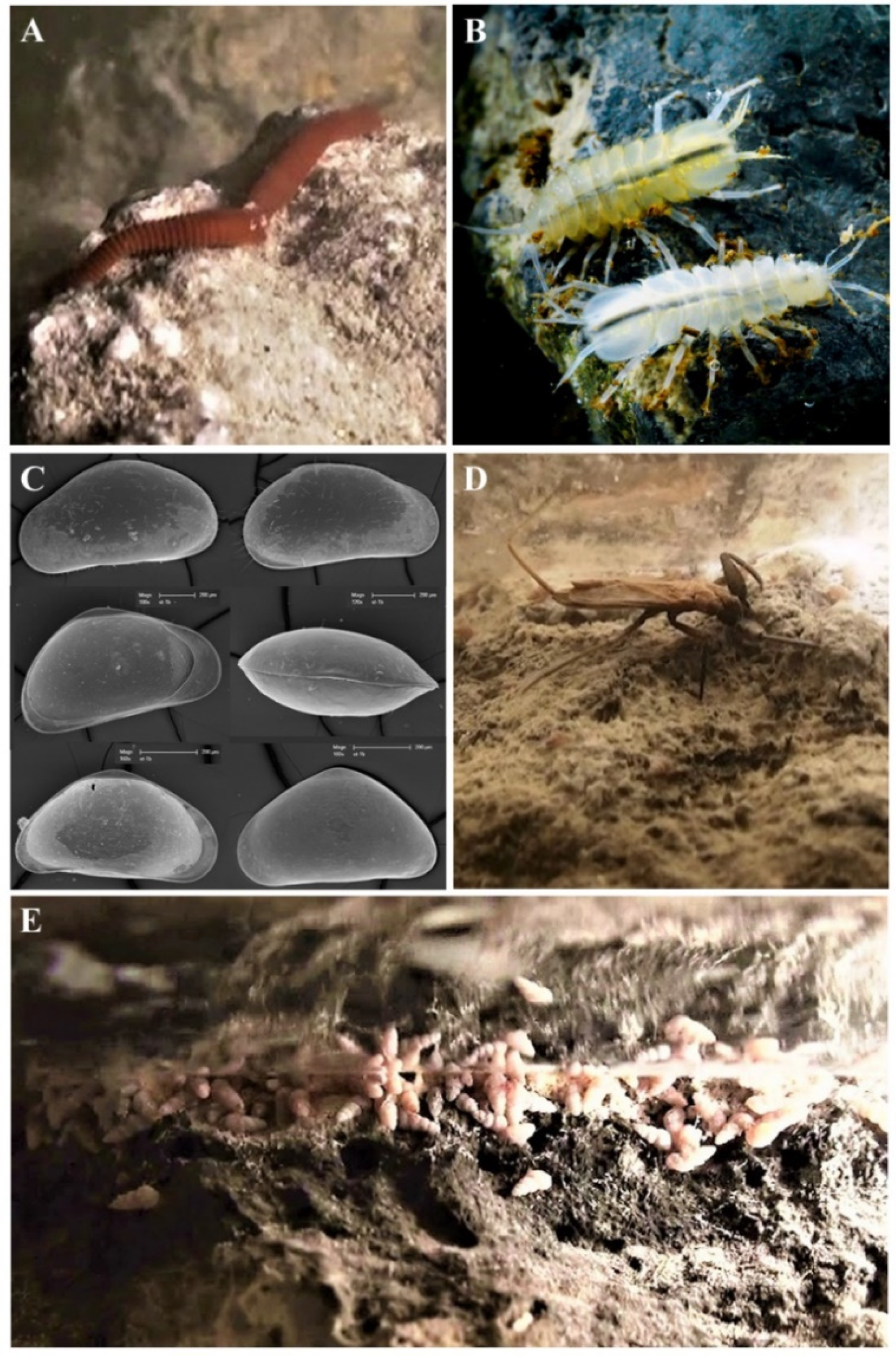
Various aquatic invertebrates from Movile Cave, including Haemopis caeca (A), Asellus aquaticus infernus (B), Pseudocandona sp. (C), Nepa anophthalma (D), and Heleobia dobrogica (E).

Aquatic invertebrates in Movile Cave include:

- Meiofauna species: rotifers, nematodes, polychaetes.
- Crustaceans: copepods, ostracods, amphipods, and isopods.
- Gastropods: Heleobia dobrogica from family Moitessieriidae.
- True bugs: Nepa anophthalma from family Nepidae (water scorpions) – the only cave-adapted water scorpion in the world.
- Leeches: Haemopis caeca.
- Earthworms: Helodrilus sp.
- Flatworms: Dendrocoelum obstinatum

Due to the sealed environment of the cave, trophic chains present are extremely simple in comparison to comparable food webs aboveground. Its base is made up of bacterial biofilms, which are taken up by

- Terrestrial – Archiboreoiulus serbansarbui, Trachelipus troglobius, Armadillidium tabacarui,
- Aquatic – Helodrilus sp., Niphargus racovitzai, Niphargus dancaui.

These primary consumers are then predated on by secondary consumers and top predators, including:

- Terrestrial – Medon dobrogicus, Agraecina cristiani, Cryptops speleorex
- Aquatic – Nepa anophthalma, Haemopis caeca

==== Terrestrial fauna ====
The terrestrial ecosystem present within the cave is composed of a variety of isopod, spider, pseudoscorpions, acarian, chilopods, millipedes, springtails, dipluran, and beetle species. The largest invertebrate and top predator in the cave is the centipede Cryptops speleorex, which constantly roams the cave for prey, from collembolan or coleoptera species to isopods. Other centipedes (Geophilus sp., Clinopodes carinthiacus) are also amongst the top predators in the cave.

The largest species diversity and density within the cave is found within the "Lake Room", containing many species of millipedes (Archiboreoiulus serbansarbui, Strongylosoma jaqueti), isopods (Trachelipus troglobius), and water scorpions (Nepa anophthalma), likely due to the presence of O_{2} in the chamber. In contrast, primarily isopods (Caucasonethes vandeli pygmaeus, Armadillidium tabacarui) are found in oxygen absent chambers.

== Microbiology ==
The Movile Cave represents a distinct habitat that shelters a multidisciplinary community of microbial eukaryotes adapted to very specific low-oxygen, high-sulfide, and methane-saturated environments. Their significance in ecosystem stability is as a result of their communities and association with chemosynthetic bacteria and archaea.

=== Prokaryotes ===
The Movile Cave's unique groundwater system supports a complex community of chemoautotrophic primary producers. The different "rooms" of the cave have distinctive chemo-physiological conditions, allowing for the cultivation of unique bacterial genera in each environment.

==== Biofilm-associated bacterial community ====
The surface waters and most of the cave walls are covered in varying sizes of bacterial biofilms ranging from small, white floating patches in the Lake Room and Air-bell I to yellowish biofilms up to 2 cm (3/4 in) thick found in Air-bell II.

Because of differing atmospheric conditions throughout the cave, the sizes and community compositions of biofilms differ significantly by location, resulting in metabolically-related microbial communities forming at specific cave sites. Preliminary studies of cave microbial mats revealed metabolically active methylotrophs and sulfur oxidizers, suggesting a lithotrophy-dominated ecosystem.

Kumaseran et al. discovered the representative species Ca. Methylomas sp. LWB in microbial mats, presenting evidence for aerobic methylotrophy in the cave.

Similar studies by Aerts et al. found complex groups of unique genera in biofilm samples collected at 3 sub-locations:

- (1) from floating (surface) biofilms in Air-bell II
- (2) from wall biofilms in Air-bell II
- (3) from submerged biofilms on rocks below Air-Bell I

The identified microbial community from those samples are dominated by unique chemoautotrophic genera:

- (1) Air-bell II surface (floating) biofilm:
  - Aquimonas – promotes denitrification, keystone genus to determine biofilm stability
  - Methylophilaceae – methanol and methylamine reducer
  - Rhodomicrobium – iron oxidizing purple non-sulfur bacteria, using HS^{-} as an alternate electron acceptor
- (2) Air-bell II wall biofilm:
  - Woodsholea – halophilic bacteria, unclear metabolism
- (3) Air-bell I submerged biofilm:
  - Nitrospiraceae – genus of ammonia and nitrite oxidizers

==== Cave water-associated bacterial community ====
Cave lake water samples reveal an equally complex microbial ecosystem of methanotrophs and sulfur-oxidizers, providing substrates to support life for microbes and invertebrates. Methanotrophic strains belonging to genera Methylomonas, Methylococcus, Methylocystis/Methylosinus were found to be dominant methanotrophs in water samples and encode key methane monooxygenase genes, pmoA and mmoX. Members of the sulfur-oxidizer genera Thiovulum were much more abundant and more metabolically active in Air-bell II than the Lake Room, but are dominant in both hypoxic and normoxic cave lake waters. The newly proposed species Ca. Thiovulum stygium is found to possess nitrate reduction operons (nar and nap) as well as polysulfide reductase and sulfite exporter genes (nrfD and tauE respectively), suggesting its multifunctionality as an aerobic and anaerobic sulfide oxidation. Surface waters in the Lake Room had a diverse community of genera Sphingobacterium, Stenotrophomonas and Thiovirga, while deep waters between Air-bell I and II had a high concentration of acidophilic species, mostly related to the genus Acinetobacter.

==== Sediment-associated bacterial community ====
Although Movile Cave sediments were initially thought to be mostly anoxic, recent metagenomic analyses reveal potential for microoxic sedimentary environments, primarily driven by chemolithoautotrophic processes and microbial commensalism. High abundances of microorganisms belonging to the aerobic iron-oxidizing bacterial family Gallionellaceae were found in sediment samples, specifically members of the genera Sideroxydans and Gallionella. This discovery, along with the detection of methane monooxygenase genes, suggested the possibility of proteobacterial aerobic methylotrophy as a relevant metabolic pathway for sedimentary bacterial communities.

Sedimentary microbial communities can differ depending on their proximity to Movile Cave lakewater and cultivates microniches with varying metabolic relationships. Sulfur oxidation is found to be dominant processes in lakeside sediments, evidenced by complete pathways present in the order Thiohalomonadales and family Arcobateraceae.

Products of sulfur respiration coupled with hydrogen sulfide were found in lake-distant samples, however a full oxidation pathway could not be metagenomically assembled. Nitrogen respiration and denitrification are also key metabolic drivers in Movile Cave sediments, though most pathways are incomplete. In lake-proximal samples, genes encoding ammonia monooxygenase subunits were related to the order Methylococcales. Genes for the first and second steps of dissimilatory nitrogen reduction to ammonia (DNRA) were found in lake-proximal and -distal samples, and closely associated with phyla Acidobacteriota, Planctomycetota, and Gammaproteobacteria.

Genes associated with methane (CH_{4}) and carbon dioxide (CO_{2}) fixation have been found at both lake-distal and lake-proximal sediments. All subunits of particulate methane monooxygenase (pMMO) could be encoded from genes related to the family Methylococcales, thus suggesting the potential of methanotrophy occurring in the cave.

Predictive gene associations have also linked CO_{2} fixation processes with several taxonomic classes:

- Chloroflexota – phylum comprising mainly thermophiles
- Micrarchaeota – phylum of acidophilic archaea (Kadnikov et al., 2020)
- Methylocella – genus of class Alphaproteobacteria comprising facultative acidophilic methanotrophs (Dedysh et al., 2005)
- Order Dongiales, formerly known as family Rhodospirillaceae, a group of non-sulfur purple bacteria(Baldani et al., 2014)
- Thiohalomonadales – order of class Gammaproteobacteria comprising mainly moderate halophiles (Sorokin et al., 2007)

=== Eukaryotes ===
Movile Cave hosts a wide range of eukaryotic organisms such as fungi and protists, which are the key eukaryotic groups within microbial mats. Protists are mainly involved as decomposers and oxygen producers within the Movile cave. The most dominant eukaryotic supergroups in Movile cave include alveolates (e. ciliates, stramenopiles (e. g. bicosoecids) and Excavata (e. g. jakobids). Within these groups, Alveolata and Strameophiles is revealed to be more abundant in microbial mats, while Excavata primarily dominated the plankton fraction of the oxygen-depleted water column.

==== Alveolata ====
Alveolata are abundant in the microbial mats and plankton as keystone grazers in Movile cave, regulating bacterial populations and promoting organic matter turnover. Alveolate sequences found in the cave were mostly associated with ciliates, with few that belonged to phylum Apicomplexa. Within Apicomplexa, the most dominant group found were gregarines, namely Ancora spp. Dinoflagellates and a small number of parasitic perkinsids were present, but not as abundant. Interestingly, some sequences were related to photosynthetic species, but considering the anoxic conditions within the cave, they may be feeding on bacteria instead. The majority of the alveolate sequences were spread across different classes of ciliates, with three abundant classes—Armophorea, Phyllopharyngea and Oligohymenophorea. Armophorea mainly includes ciliates that thrive in anaerobic or microaerophilic environments, with sequences linked to anaerobic metopids and some may have parasitic lifestyles. A novel clade under class Phyllopharyngea was the most abundant in cave ecosystems, and represents a new possible ciliate group. The class Oligohymenophorea had the greatest diversity, having numerous genetic sequences resembling anoxic or suboxic species.

==== Stramenopiles ====
Stramenopiles (also known as heterokonts) are another dominant group that include primary bicosoecids associated mainly with microbial mats and are crucial to organic matter decomposition and nutrient recycling. Stramenophiles found in the Movile Cave were also very diverse, and clustered into three abundant groups—Bicosoecids, Labyrinthulids, and Chrysophytes. Most abundant and diverse clades found within these groups were Bicosoecids, including 156 sequences while also sharing similarities with another environmental sequence from a shallow subtropical lake. Consistent with the cave's low-oxygen conditions, the environmental sequences most closely related to the Movile OTUs were sourced from oxygen-deprived habitats or species that thrive in microaerophilic or anaerobic conditions. Furthermore, diatom clades such as MOV-ST-4 and MOV-ST-5 that were found along Chrysophytes, are depicted to be heterotrophic lineages that are adapted to the cave ecosystem. Additional heterotrophic groups identified include Opalomonadea and MAST-3 clades, along with saprophytic Labyrinthulids and bicosoecids all adapted to the nutrient-poor and anoxic cave environment.

==== Excavata ====
Excavates in the Movile Cave were very diverse, with gene sequence similarities that averaged around 70-75%. Most sequences were related to the Stygiellidae family, including the genera Stygiella and Velundella, mainly inhabiting anoxic, sulfide- and ammonium-rich marine environments. However, the most abundant and diverse clade, MOV-EX-3 formed a distinct lineage to jakobids, and some raised a possibility of a new jakobid family.

==== Fungi ====
A total of 123 microfungal species have been identified within the Movile Cave ecosystem, with a notably high occurrence of microfungal spores. Of these, 96 species were detected exclusively inside the cave. 90 species were found in the dry sections, including 51 from cave air, 42 from cave sediments, and 41 from various substrates such as dead invertebrates, corroded cave walls, and isopod feces. Airbell II contained 28 fungal species in which 23 species were present in sediments and 9 in the floating microbial mat. While most fungal species were widely distributed across the cave's underground habitats, two species including an undescribed species of Aspergillus sect. Candidisa and Talaromyces ruber were found exclusively in the sediments of Airbell II, while one species was found exclusively in the microbial mat in Airbell II. Due to a lack of fungal surveys following the cave's initial discovery in 1986, it remains uncertain whether these fungi are native or were introduced through contamination by researchers.

== Symbiotic relationships ==
Some organisms in Movile Cave, including some invertebrate species, are dependent on symbiotic associates with chemosynthetic microorganisms. Some species, including cave-adapted isopods and leeches directly feed on microbial biofilms via their mouths, while others host endosymbiotic bacteria in their guts which aid both digestion and nutrient absorption.

=== Microbe-microbe symbiosis ===
Resident microorganisms of Movile Cave have both mutualistic and competitive interactions that balance the ecosystem equilibrium. Mutualism is evident between certain microbial populations, mainly the chemosynthetic bacteria, with these organisms being primarily involved in nutrient cycling. For example, the sulfur-oxidizing bacteria such as Beggiatoa and Thiobacillus oxidize hydrogen sulfide to sulfate, providing materials needed by other microbial communities. Similarly, Methanotrophic bacteria like Methylomonas oxidize methane and contribute organic carbon to heterotrophic microorganisms. These cooperative interactions create stable microbial mats, the high-energy foundation of the cave food web.

=== Microbe-invertebrate symbiosis ===
Two species of the groundwater amphipod genus Niphargus have been observed in Movile Cave. One specimen of the species Niphargus cf. stygius found in Movile Cave was observed in an ectosymbiotic relationship with sulfur-oxidizing Thiothrix bacteria, a genus of bacteria known to thrive in inverse sulfur-oxygen gradients, and have been observed in ectosymbiotic relationships with invertebrates in hydrothermal vent locations. Thiothrix was found primarily attached to the hairs and spines on the amphipods' legs and antennae. These epibionts were discovered through genetic sequencing to be genetically different from the free-living Thiothrix found in microbial mats within Movile Cave, suggesting the epibionts have adapted to living on Niphargus cf. stygius. This association suggests an ecological interaction, where the bacteria may play a role in nutrient acquisition or protection against pathogens in the nutrient-poor, sulfur-rich cave environment.

== Evolutionary significance ==
The long-term isolation of Movile Cave has led to unique evolutionary adaptations of its microorganisms and eukaryotic communities. They have undergone genetic divergence in small isolated populations and established novel symbioses, such as those between invertebrates and sulphur-oxidizing bacteria. Studying these systems provides insights into the early evolution of eukaryotes with an interest in protists adapted to anoxic conditions. In this respect, Movile Cave also provides an excellent terrestrial analogue for deep-sea hydrothermal vents and extraterrestrial ecosystems, favouring the scenario of life existing subsurface beneath moons like Europa or Enceladus.

== See also ==
- Ophel biome, proposed worldwide biome supporting similar ecosystems
- Hydrothermal vent microbial communities
- Subterranean fauna
  - Troglofauna, small animals living in caves
  - Stygofauna, fauna living in groundwater and aquifers

== Bibliography ==
- Balthazar, Jean (2003). Grenzen unseres Wissens (in German). München: Orbis Verlag. p. 268. ISBN 3-572-01370-4.
- Sarbu, Serban M.; Kane, Thomas C.; Kinkle, Brian K. (28 June 1996). "A Chemoautotrophically Based Cave Ecosystem". Science. 272 (5270): 1953–1955. Bibcode:1996Sci...272.1953S. doi:10.1126/science.272.5270.1953. PMID 8662497. S2CID 23842700.
- Wischer, Daniela; Kumaresan, Deepak; Johnston, Antonia; El Khawand, Myriam; Stephenson, Jason; Hillebrand-Voiculescu, Alexandra M; Chen, Yin; Colin Murrell, J (January 2015). "Bacterial metabolism of methylated amines and identification of novel methylotrophs in Movile Cave". The ISME Journal. 9 (1): 195–206. Bibcode:2015ISMEJ...9..195W. doi:10.1038/ismej.2014.102. PMC 4274414. PMID 25050523.
