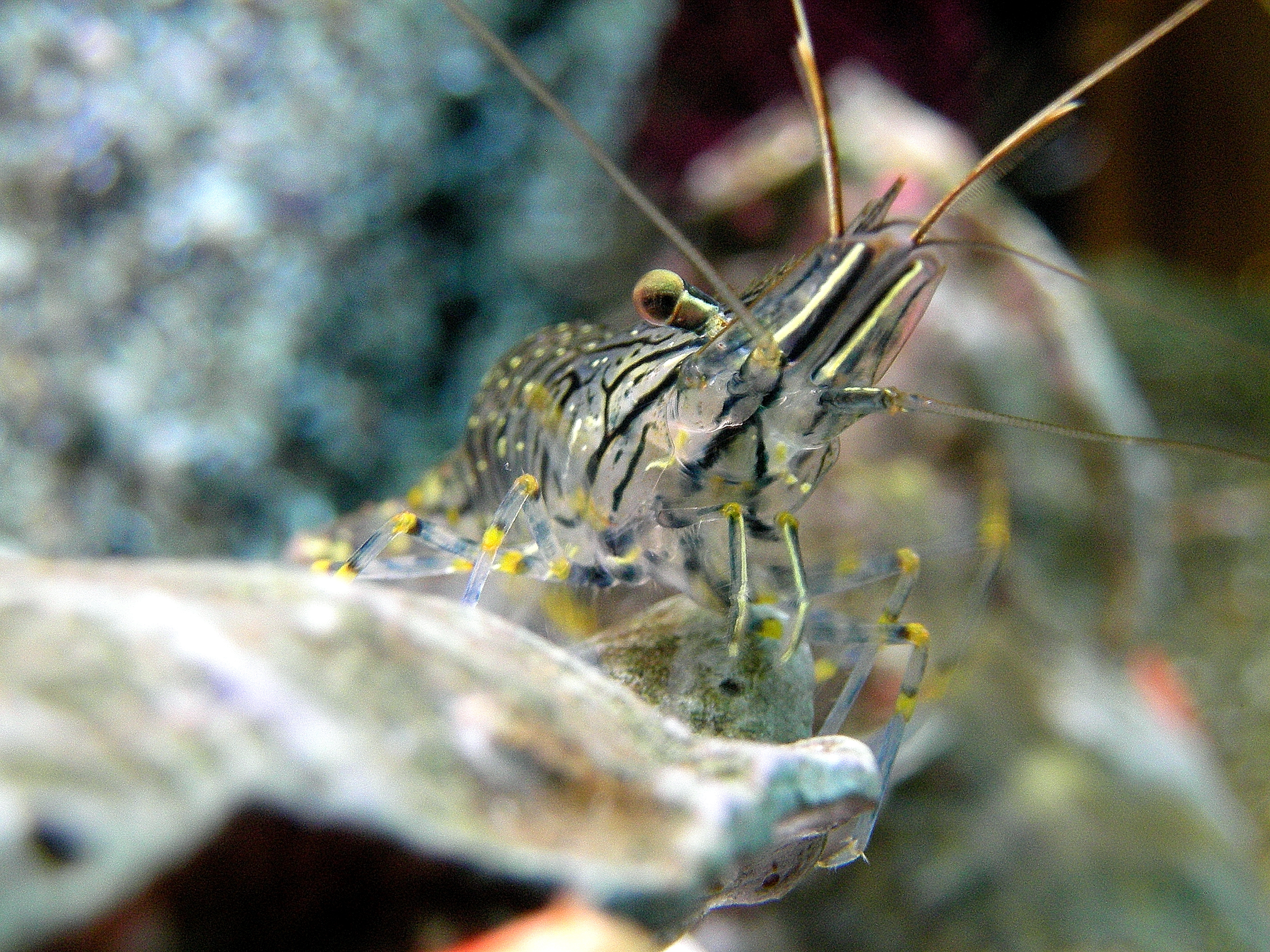
- Palaemon elegans (Palaemonidae)

Scientific classification
- Kingdom: Animalia
- Phylum: Arthropoda
- Clade: Pancrustacea
- Class: Malacostraca
- Order: Decapoda
- Suborder: Pleocyemata
- Infraorder: Caridea
- Superfamily: Palaemonoidea; Rafinesque, 1815

Families
- See text

= Palaemonoidea =

Superfamily of shrimp

Palaemonoidea is a large superfamily of shrimp, containing nearly 1,000 species. The position of the family Typhlocarididae is unclear, although the monophyly of a group containing the remaining seven families is well supported.

- Anchistioididae Borradaile, 1915
- Desmocarididae Borradaile, 1915
- Euryrhynchidae Holthuis, 1950
- Gnathophyllidae Dana, 1852
- Hymenoceridae Ortmann, 1890
- Kakaducarididae Bruce, 1993
- Palaemonidae Rafinesque, 1815
- Typhlocarididae Annandale & Kemp, 1913
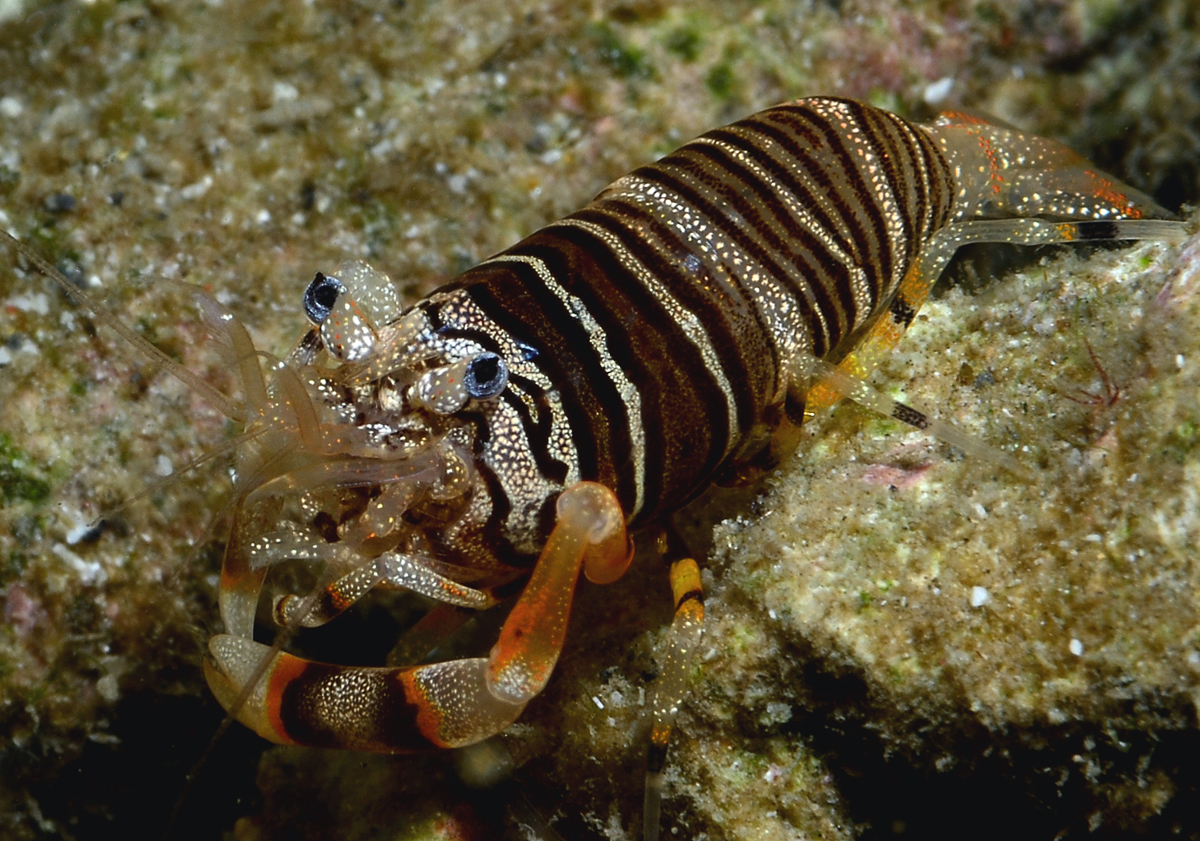
Gnathophyllum americanum, a Palaemonidae

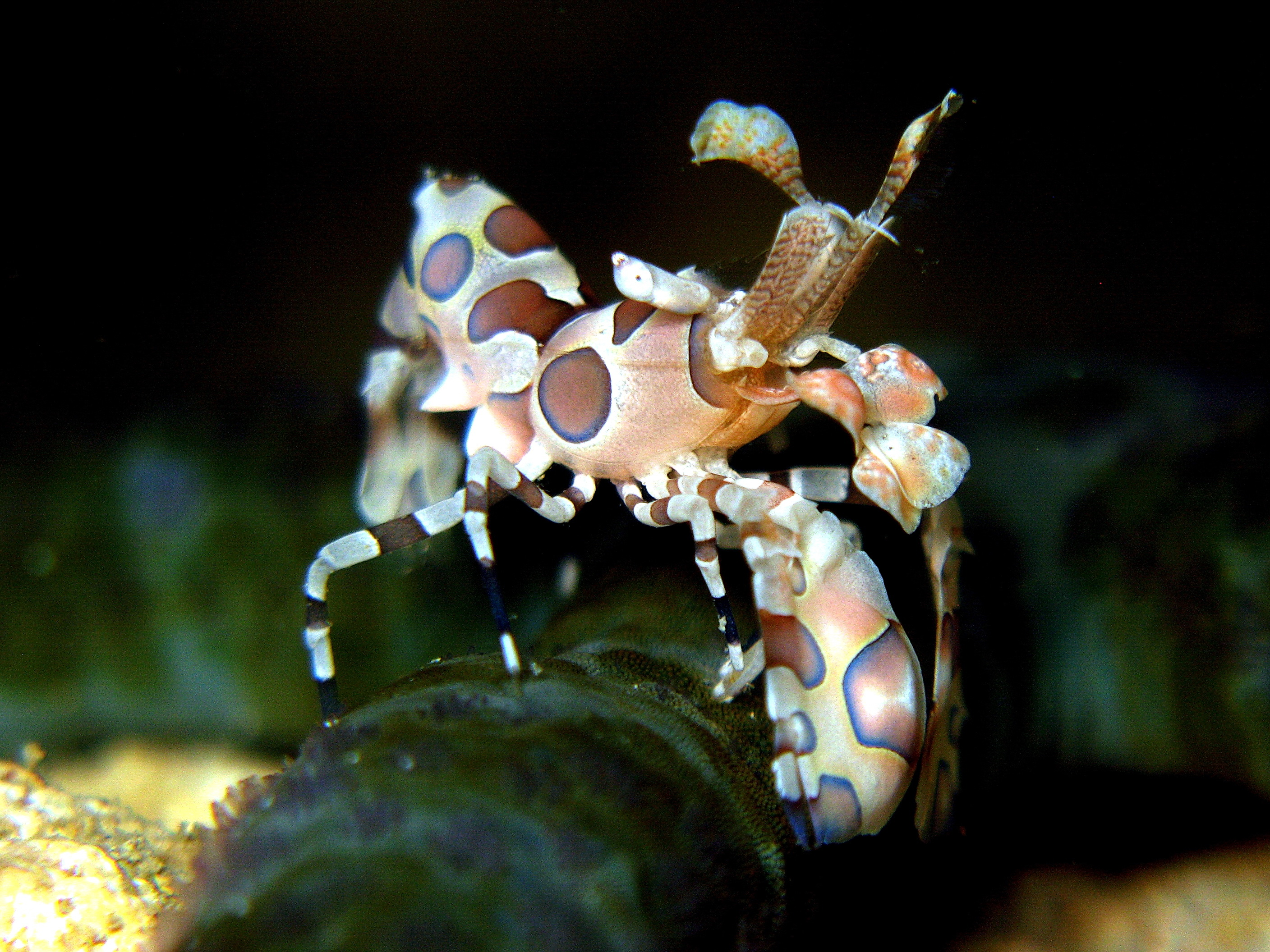
Hymenocera picta, the only Hymenoceridae

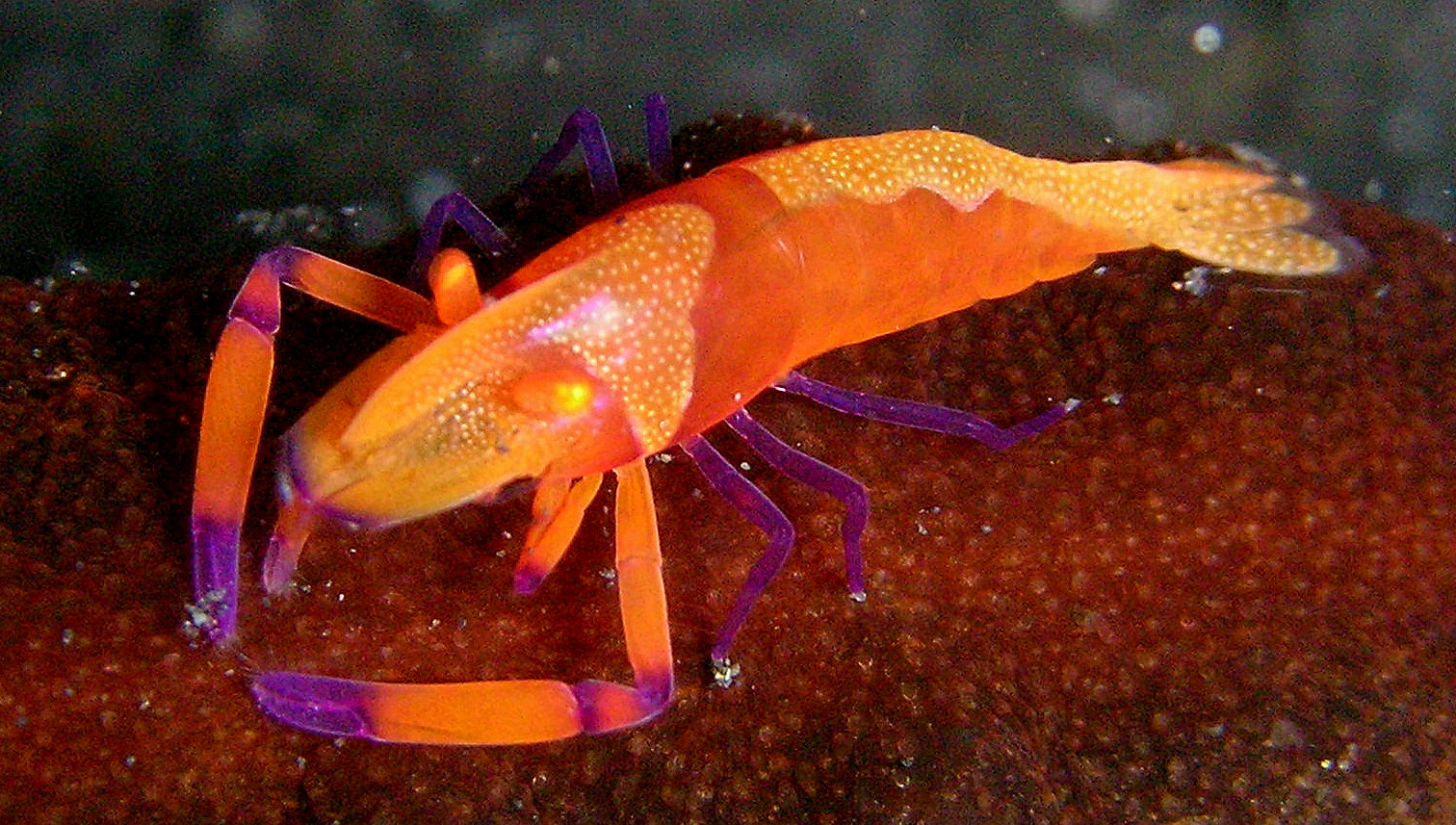
Periclimenes imperator, a Palaemonidae

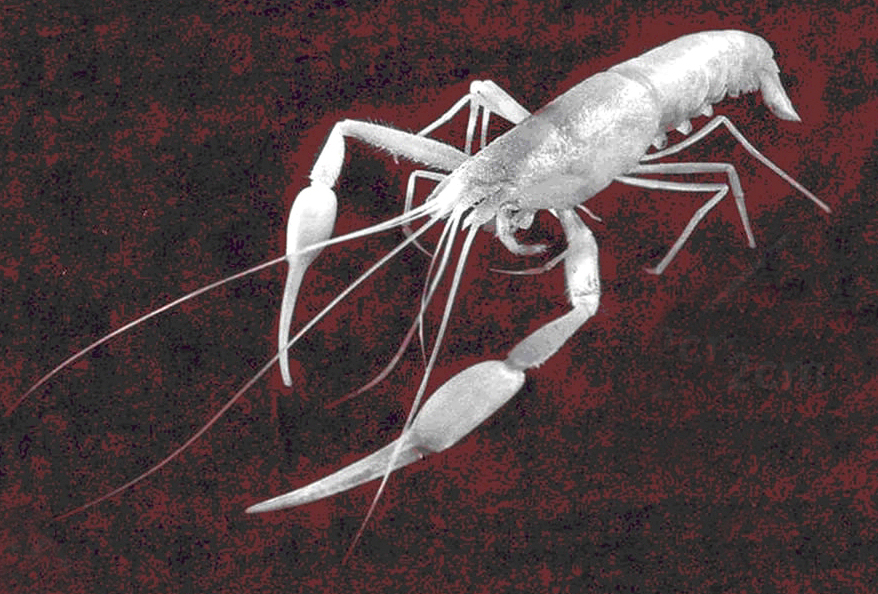
Typhlocaris ayyaloni, a Typhlocarididae

== See also ==
- Palaemon modestus
