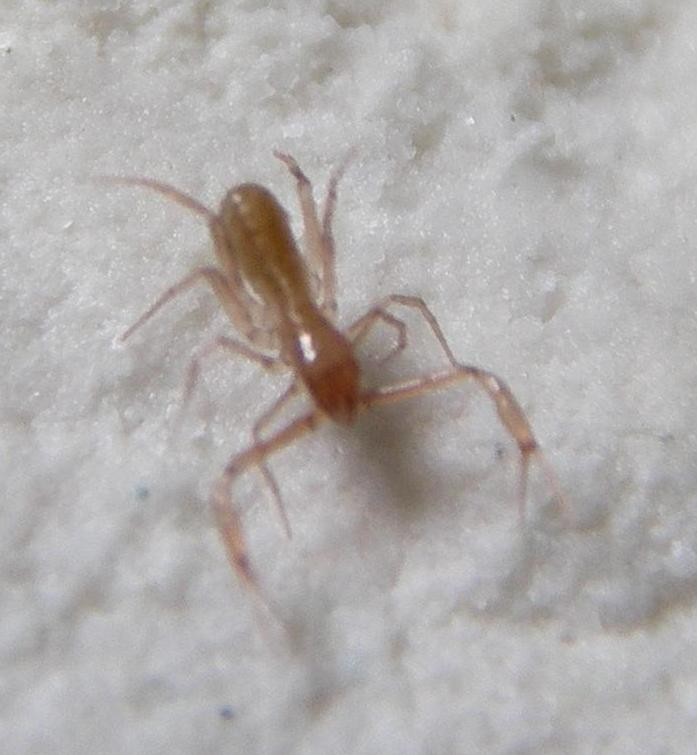

Scientific classification
- Kingdom: Animalia
- Phylum: Arthropoda
- Class: Arachnida
- Order: Pseudoscorpionida
- Family: Chthoniidae
- Genus: Ayyalonia
- Species: Ayyalonia dimentmani

Binomial name
- Ayyalonia dimentmani Ćurčić, 2008

= Ayyalonia dimentmani =

Species of pseudoscorpion

Ayyalonia dimentmani is a species of pseudoscorpion in the Chthoniidae family that is endemic to Israel.

It is an eyeless pseudoscorpion living inside karstic voids in the Ayyalon Cave system Ramla.

== See also ==
- Akrav israchanani
- Typhlocaris ayyaloni
