= Glycocaulis abyssi =

Scientific classification
- Domain: Bacteria
- Kingdom: Pseudomonadati
- Phylum: Pseudomonadota
- Class: Alphaproteobacteria
- Order: Caulobacterales
- Family: Maricaulaceae
- Genus: Glycocaulis
- Species: G. abyssi

Binomial name
- Glycocaulis abyssi Abraham et al. 2013

Species of bacterium

Glycocaulis abyssi is a bacterium from the genus Glycocaulis which has been isolated from a deep-sea hydrothermal vent near the Vancouver Island in Canada.
