= Villa Luz Cave =

Cave in Mexico

Coordinates: 17.4437°N 92.7648°W

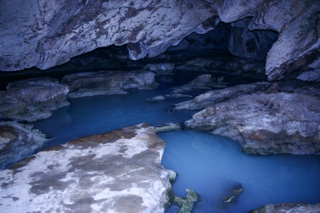
Inside the cave

Villa Luz Cave, Spanish name Cueva de Villa Luz (lit. Cave of the Lighted Town), also known as Cueva del Azufre and Cueva de las Sardinas, is a cave near Tapijulapa in the southern Mexican state of Tabasco. The springs within the cave are rich in hydrogen sulfide, a gas that is a potent respiratory toxicant and smells like rotten eggs. Within the water sulfide is oxidized to colloidal sulfur which gives the water a milky appearance, and creates sulfuric acid. The cave is essentially a maze about two kilometers in length and primarily etched out of limestone by the sulfuric acid in the water. Hydrogen sulfide is also used by chemoautotrophic bacteria, which form the base of the food web.

The cave is a popular tourist destination and visited by many, partly because it is easily accessible. It has been featured on the BBC's series Planet Earth, and Wonders of the Solar System.

== See also ==
- Ophel biome, proposed worldwide biome supporting similar ecosystems
  - Similar caves where life partly or fully depends on chemosynthesis: Movile Cave in Romania, the first one identified, Ein-Nur Cave and Ayalon Cave (Israel), Frasassi Caves (Italy), Melissotrypa Cave (Elassona municipality, Greece), Tashan Cave (Iran), caves in the Sharo-Argun Valley in the Caucasus Mountains, Lower Kane Cave, Cesspool Cave (Wyoming and Alleghany County, VA, USA).
