= Yovel Cave =

Karst cave in Ofra, Israel

- מערת היובל
- Interactive map of Yovel Cave
- Location: Near Ofra, Benjamin Region
- Coordinates: 31°57′28″N 35°15′28″E
- Length: 88 m (289 ft)
- Discovery: Late 2025
- Geology: Karst

Yovel Cave (Hebrew: מערת היובל, romanized: Mearat HaYovel, lit. 'Jubilee Cave') is a massive karst cave located near the Israeli settlement of Ofra in the Benjamin region. It is recognized as the largest natural underground site in Israel.

The cave was named "Yovel" (Jubilee) because it was revealed at the time the settlement of Ofra marked its 50th anniversary.

== Discovery ==
The cave was discovered in late 2025 by the Israel Cave Research Center (ICRC) at the Hebrew University of Jerusalem. The exploration was carried out by a team of divers led by Vladimir Buslov, Ran Ben Yair, Reuven Zakai, Yuri Lisobets, and Yoav Negev.

According to Amos Frumkin, director of the Cave Research Center at the Institute of Earth Sciences at the Hebrew University, no humans had ever entered the cave prior to its discovery. However, the presence of a snake skeleton found on the cave floor indicates that living creatures had occasionally fallen inside.

== Conservation concerns ==
Despite its geological and scientific importance, the cave is currently under threat due to its location. According to the Society for the Protection of Nature in Israel (SPNI), ongoing widening works on Route 60 near Ofra endanger the structural integrity of the cave and the sinkholes above it, raising the risk of collapse and of construction vehicles falling into the cavern. Matan Nachum, an SPNI nature conservation coordinator for the Jerusalem and Judea and Samaria area, said that road-widening works in the region are not preceded by the preliminary surveys legally required elsewhere in Israel, which has led to the unexpected exposure of significant finds such as Yovel Cave.

Plans for a dedicated "caves park" near Ofra, intended to protect the area's karst formations, have reportedly been pending approval by the head of the Civil Administration for several years. Until such approval is granted, the Israel Nature and Parks Authority, the SPNI, the Cave Research Center, and the local council of Ofra have been working together to preserve the site.

== Characteristics ==
- Type: Karst / Stalactite cave
- Length: 88 meters
- Width: 75 meters
