= Glycocaulis profundi =

Scientific classification
- Domain: Bacteria
- Kingdom: Pseudomonadati
- Phylum: Pseudomonadota
- Class: Alphaproteobacteria
- Order: Caulobacterales
- Family: Maricaulaceae
- Genus: Glycocaulis
- Species: G. profundi

Binomial name
- Glycocaulis profundi Sun et al. 2020

Type strain
- ZYF765

Species of bacterium

Glycocaulis profundi is a Gram-negative, strictly aerobic and rod-shaped bacterium from the genus Glycocaulis which has been isolated from seawater from a depth of 4000 meter from the Mariana Trench.
