= Marinicauda pacifica =

Scientific classification
- Domain: Bacteria
- Kingdom: Pseudomonadati
- Phylum: Pseudomonadota
- Class: Alphaproteobacteria
- Order: Caulobacterales
- Family: Maricaulaceae
- Genus: Marinicauda
- Species: M. pacifica

Binomial name
- Marinicauda pacifica Zhang et al. 2013

Type strain
- P-1 km-3

Species of bacterium

Marinicauda pacifica is a Gram-negative and aerobic bacterium from the genus of Marinicauda which has been isolated from deep seawater.
