= Glycocaulis alkaliphilus =

Scientific classification
- Domain: Bacteria
- Kingdom: Pseudomonadati
- Phylum: Pseudomonadota
- Class: Alphaproteobacteria
- Order: Caulobacterales
- Family: Maricaulaceae
- Genus: Glycocaulis
- Species: G. alkaliphilus

Binomial name
- Glycocaulis alkaliphilus Geng et al. 2015

Type strain
- 6B-8

Species of bacterium

Glycocaulis alkaliphilus is a Gram-negative, aerobic and dimorphic bacterium from the genus Glycocaulis which has been isolated from crude oil from the Daqing oilfield in China.
