= Marinicauda salina =

Scientific classification
- Domain: Bacteria
- Kingdom: Pseudomonadati
- Phylum: Pseudomonadota
- Class: Alphaproteobacteria
- Order: Caulobacterales
- Family: Maricaulaceae
- Genus: Marinicauda
- Species: M. salina

Binomial name
- Marinicauda salina Zhai et al. 2019

Type strain
- WD6-1

Species of bacterium

Marinicauda salina is a Gram-negative and aerobic bacterium from the genus of Marinicauda which has been isolated from a marine solar saltern.
