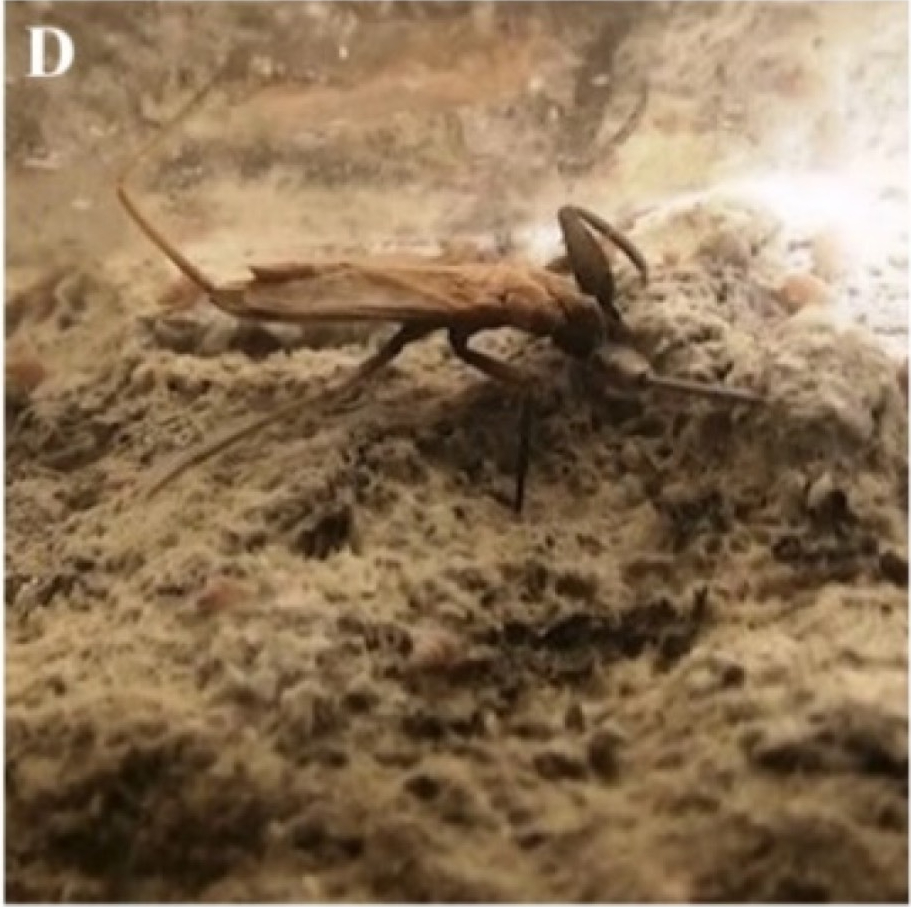
- Nepa anophthalma specimen found in Movile cave

Scientific classification
- Kingdom: Animalia
- Phylum: Arthropoda
- Class: Insecta
- Order: Hemiptera
- Suborder: Heteroptera
- Family: Nepidae
- Genus: Nepa
- Species: N. anophthalma

Binomial name
- Nepa anophthalma Decu et al., 1994

= Nepa anophthalma =

Species of insect

Nepa anophthalma is a species of troglofaunal insect in the Nepidae family (water scorpions), and in the genus Nepa. It holds the distinction of being the only known cave-adapted water scorpion so far discovered. Like with most troglobites, this genus has a limited distribution range, with it only being found in Movile cave, a cave in Romania known for its unique ecosystem supported by chemosynthesis, and with little oxygen. It is often considered a top predator within the aquatic environments of this cave, with very little competition with other animals.

== Discovery ==
Movile cave was first discovered in 1986 by a team of workers looking for an appropriate spot to build a power plant. Less than a hundred or so have actually been allowed inside the cave due to the number of hazards inside (lack of a natural opening, high levels of carbon dioxide and sulfur, hydrogen sulfide, etc.). The cave also has very high humidity and temperatures, but also has very low levels of oxygen, with some of the deeper water levels in the cave being completely anoxic. Despite these daunting conditions, the cave boasts very high levels of biodiversity, with dozens of species having been discovered, with about 75% only living in this system. Nepa anophthalma was first described in 1994 based on eleven or so specimens, and at the time was one of twelve or so species known from the cave. The species name roughly translates to "without eyes", which is after this species lacking eyes due to its troglobitic ecology.

== Evolution ==
The fauna of Movile cave are notable due to being cut off from the rest of the world for about 5.5 million years, and thus are important for looking into the evolution of various groups. Despite this, not all of the fauna are that old, with some species appearing to be more recent additions to the caves ecosystem, with N. anophthalma being among these. It has been proposed that the ancestors of this water scorpion first arrived to Movile Cave sometime during the Pleistocene epoch, potentially through microfissures located in water-filled sinkholes in the region that were cut off once large amounts of clay were deposited in the area towards the end of the Riss glaciation. This is not unheard of, as another denizen of Movile cave, Heleobia dobrogica, the cave's sole gastropod, is thought to have inhabited the cave for slightly more than 2 million years.

== Description ==
Males of the species are known to reach around 17.0 to 19.1 millimeters in length, while the females are around 17.0 to 20.3 millimeters. Like with most other troglobites, this insect is entirely blind. However, this species still has intact optic nerves, and pigment. Known specimens are either brown-yellow brown in color, and the body is elongated, and flattened on the dorsal plane. Known specimens also possess bi-segmented antennae, usually around 0.8 to 1.0 millimeters long. This species also has brachyptery, a condition in animals that indicates short, or at very least reduced wings, which is not that surprising considering its entirely aquatic lifestyle. The hemelytral membranes are also reduced, a contrast to most other water scorpions.

== Ecology ==
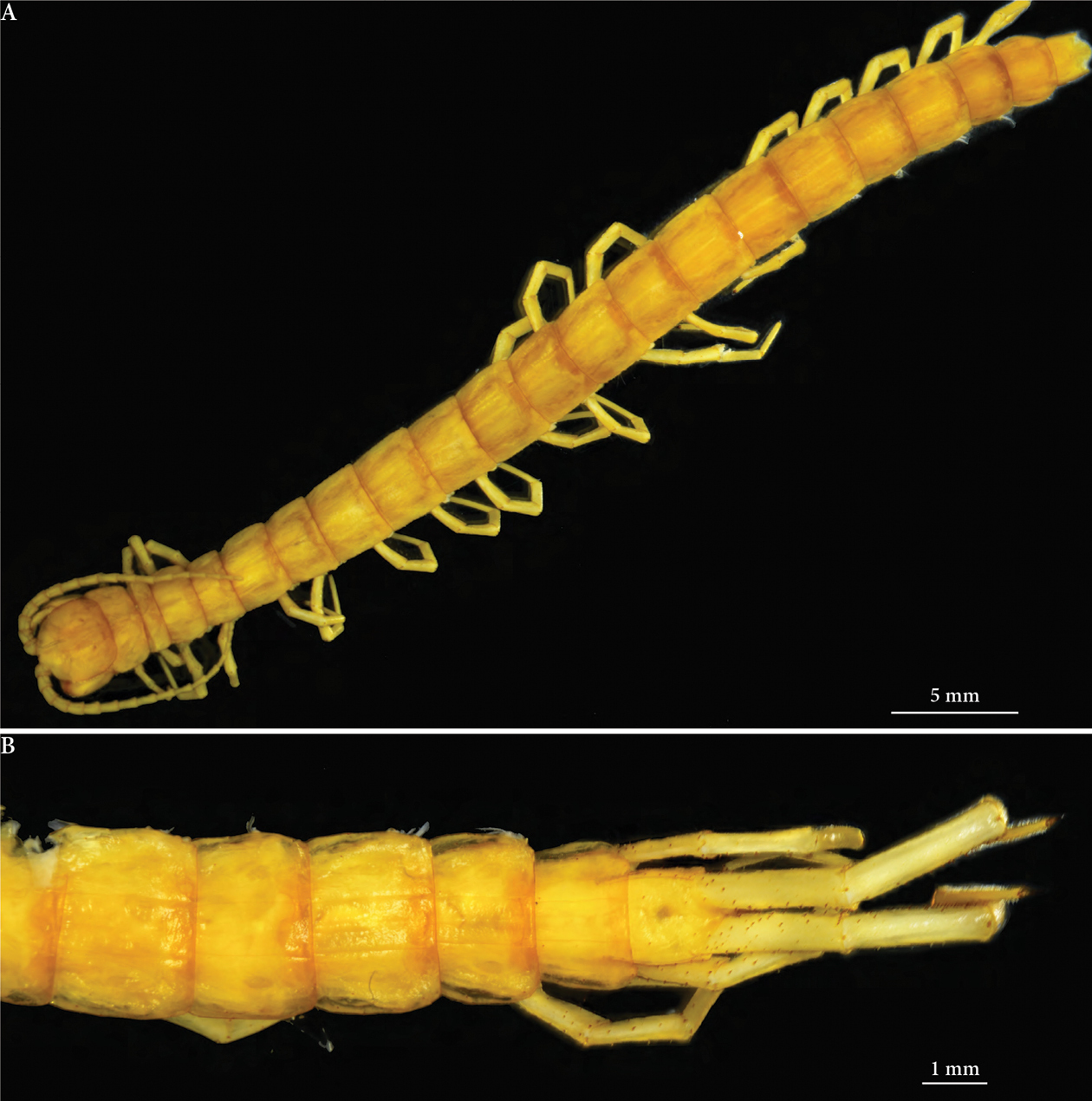
Holotype specimen of Cryptops speleorex, a troglofaunal centipede, and is not only one of Movile Cave's largest terrestrial predators, but also the largest invertebrate from the cave.

This species is known only from the margins of a water body in Movile cave, as well as air pockets below the surface. This species therefore seems to only inhabit the upper depths of the lake, as no other animals have been found living below five centimeters. The water itself reaches a temperature of around 8 to 10 degrees Celsius, and contains not only sulfur, but also bacteria that have evolved to oxidize the sulfur. These microorganisms appear to form the base of Movile cave's food web, in the place of the sun, bat guano, and other sources. N. anophthalma shares the cave's waterways with a plethora of wildlife including "ciliates, turbellarians, nematodes, oligochaetes, hirudineans, gastropods, ostracods, copepods, amphipods, and isopods", however, there are also terrestrial troglobites including a centipede (Cryptops speleorex), Isopods, pseudoscorpions, and spiders. This water scorpion fills the role of top predator in the cave's waterways, alongside undescribed members of the Dendrocoelum and Haemopis genera.
