= Marinicauda algicola =

Scientific classification
- Domain: Bacteria
- Kingdom: Pseudomonadati
- Phylum: Pseudomonadota
- Class: Alphaproteobacteria
- Order: Caulobacterales
- Family: Maricaulaceae
- Genus: Marinicauda
- Species: M. algicola

Binomial name
- Marinicauda algicola Jeong et al. 2017

Species of bacterium

Marinicauda algicola is a Gram-negative bacterium from the genus of Marinicauda which has been isolated from the alga Rhodosorus marinus from Korea.
