= Glycocaulis albus =

Scientific classification
- Domain: Bacteria
- Kingdom: Pseudomonadati
- Phylum: Pseudomonadota
- Class: Alphaproteobacteria
- Order: Caulobacterales
- Family: Maricaulaceae
- Genus: Glycocaulis
- Species: G. albus

Binomial name
- Glycocaulis albus Lv et al. 2014

Species of bacterium

Glycocaulis albus is a Gram-negative, aerobic, mesophilic, moderately halophilic and motile bacterium from the genus Glycocaulis which has been isolated from saline soil which was contaminated with petroleum from the Shengli Oilfield in China.
