= Glycocaulis =

Scientific classification
- Domain: Bacteria
- Kingdom: Pseudomonadati
- Phylum: Pseudomonadota
- Class: Alphaproteobacteria
- Order: Caulobacterales
- Family: Maricaulaceae
- Genus: Glycocaulis; Abraham et al. 2013

Species
- Glycocaulis abyssi Glycocaulis albus Glycocaulis alkaliphilus Glycocaulis profundi

Genus of bacteria

Glycocaulis is a genus of bacteria from the family Maricaulaceae.
