= Salt cave =

Cave formed within rock salt

A salt cave is a cave formed within rock salt by the dissolution of this very soluble rock by water. As with other soluble rocks, a distinctive set of landscape features can arise from the solutional process; in this case it is known as salt karst or 'halite karst'. The three key areas of salt karst are those in Iran, Israel and Spain, together with an example in Romania. Malcham cave in Israel is the longest salt cave in the world with a measured length of over 10km. It is located at Mount Sodom. There are significant salt caves on Qeshm Island in Iran including Tri Nahacu Cave and Namakdan Cave. This cave was listed in October 2022 by the International Union of Geological Sciences in their 'First 100 IUGS Geological Heritage Sites' as being of global significance for the understanding of tectonics and ongoing geological processes. Amongst the caves developed within the several salt karsts in Spain are Cova dels Meandres de Sales which at 4.3km in length is the world's third longest. The fourth longest is Pestera 6S de la Mânzălesti, in România, at 3.1km in length.

A notable salt cave in Turkey is the Çankırı Salt Cave (Çankırı Tuz Mağarası), located near the city of Çankırı. The cave forms part of one of the world's oldest known rock salt mining areas, with salt extraction dating back approximately 5,000 years to the Hittite period. Today, portions of the cave are open to visitors and are used for tourism and recreational purposes.
