= Euryrhynchidae =

Scientific classification
- Domain: Eukaryota
- Kingdom: Animalia
- Phylum: Arthropoda
- Class: Malacostraca
- Order: Decapoda
- Suborder: Pleocyemata
- Infraorder: Caridea
- Superfamily: Palaemonoidea
- Family: Euryrhynchidae; Holthuis, 1950

Family of crustaceans

Euryrhynchidae is a family of crustaceans belonging to the order Decapoda.

Genera:

- Eurindicus De Grave, Arjun & Raghavan, 2018
- Euryrhynchina Powell, 1976
- Euryrhynchoides Powell, 1976
- Euryrhynchus Miers, 1878
