= Maricaulis =

Scientific classification
- Domain: Bacteria
- Kingdom: Pseudomonadati
- Phylum: Pseudomonadota
- Class: Alphaproteobacteria
- Order: Caulobacterales
- Family: Maricaulaceae
- Genus: Maricaulis; Abraham et al. 1999

Species
- Maricaulis maris (Poindexter 1964) Abraham et al. 1999; Maricaulis parjimensis Abraham et al. 2002; Maricaulis salignorans Abraham et al. 2002; Maricaulis virginensis Abraham et al. 2002; Maricaulis washingtonensis Abraham et al. 2002

Synonyms
- Marinocaulobacter

Genus of bacteria

Maricaulis is a genus of bacteria in the family Maricaulaceae.
