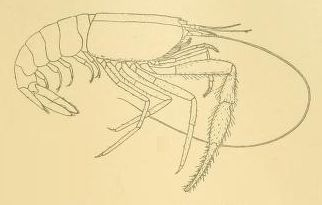
- Male. Plate from Calman, 1909

Scientific classification
- Kingdom: Animalia
- Phylum: Arthropoda
- Clade: Pancrustacea
- Class: Malacostraca
- Order: Decapoda
- Suborder: Pleocyemata
- Infraorder: Caridea
- Family: Typhlocarididae
- Genus: Typhlocaris
- Species: T. galilea

Binomial name
- Typhlocaris galilea Calman, 1909

= Typhlocaris galilea =

Species of crustacean

Typhlocaris galilea is a species of troglobitic shrimp in the genus Typhlocaris, and is endemic to one pool and spring that feeds it, at Tabgha in Israel. The species is critically endangered and a conservation programme to conserve the species has begun.

== Description ==
The relict species was first described in 1909, by William Thomas Calman.

The shrimp are semi-transparent and blind. Adult specimens are approximately 3 inches (7.6 cm) long. Their diet probably consists mainly of a small red tubificid worm, Isochaeta israelis.

== Distribution ==
The shrimp is endemic to one chamber of a Roman cistern, Ein-Nur octagonal pool (the private property of a monastery, at 32.8736°N 35.5493°E), and a warm (27 °C or 81 °F), sulphuric, saline subterranean spring that feeds it, at Tabgha, on the north shore of the Sea of Galilee in Israel.

== Conservation ==
The species is now critically endangered, as the extraction of ground water has allowed foreign water into the pool, changing its composition and temperature. It is legally protected (Section 5, paragraphs D and E, of the Fisheries Rules of 1937 as amended).

In 2013, the Israel Nature and Parks Authority approached the Jerusalem Biblical Zoo to develop a captive breeding programme for the species, with a view to later reintroduction.

== See also ==
- Ayyalon Cave - a similar ecological niche where a related species lives
