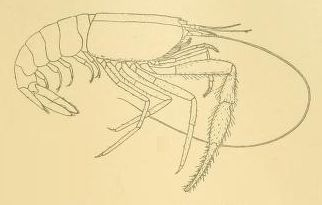
- T. galilea (male). Plate from Calman, 1909

Scientific classification
- Domain: Eukaryota
- Kingdom: Animalia
- Phylum: Arthropoda
- Class: Malacostraca
- Order: Decapoda
- Suborder: Pleocyemata
- Infraorder: Caridea
- Superfamily: Palaemonoidea (?)
- Family: Typhlocarididae; Annandale & Kemp, 1913
- Genus: Typhlocaris; Calman, 1909

Type species
- Typhlocaris galilea Calman, 1909

= Typhlocaris =

Genus of crustaceans

Typhlocaris is a genus of blind cave-dwelling shrimp, placed in its own family, Typhlocarididae. It contains 4 species:

- Typhlocaris ayyaloni Tsurnamal, 2008 – Israel
- Typhlocaris galilea Calman, 1909 – Israel
- Typhlocaris lethaea Parisi, 1920 – Libya
- Typhlocaris salentina Caroli, 1923 – Apulia (Italy)
