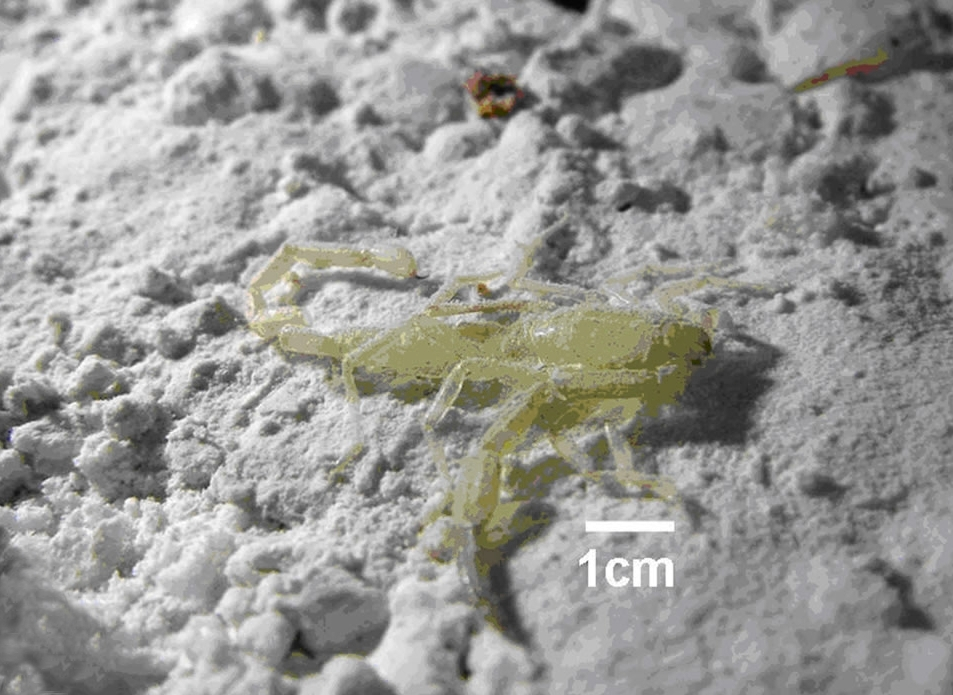

Scientific classification
- Kingdom: Animalia
- Phylum: Arthropoda
- Subphylum: Chelicerata
- Class: Arachnida
- Order: Scorpiones
- Superfamily: Chactoidea
- Family: †Akravidae; Levy, 2007
- Genus: †Akrav; Levy, 2007
- Species: †A. israchanani

Binomial name
- †Akrav israchanani Levy, 2007

= Akrav =

Extinct species of scorpion

Akrav israchanani (from Hebrew עקרב (akráv) 'scorpion') is an extinct species of scorpions from the Ayalon Cave in Israel. It is the only species in the genus Akrav and the family Akravidae.

== Description ==
Akrav israchanani was an eyeless, brown, troglobitic scorpion of about 50mm in length first described from only 20 dry, cuticular remains of hollow carcasses. The combinations of characteristics was unusual enough for the scorpion to be placed in its own, monotypic family, however this has been called into question by later researchers.

The name Akrav israchanani combines the Hebrew word for scorpion, "akrav", with the names of the researchers who identified it, Israel Naaman and Hanan Dimentman.

== Habitat and distribution ==
The scorpion was originally known only from the Ayalon Cave in Israel, a deep limestone cave, isolated from rainwater and the surface by a layer of chalk. The extinction of the scorpion is inferred from the lack of live or recently dead specimens. In December 2015, more scorpion remains were found in the nearby Levana Cave.

== See also ==
- Wildlife of Israel
- Typhlocaris ayyaloni
- Ayyalonia dimentmani
