= Marinicauda =

Scientific classification
- Domain: Bacteria
- Kingdom: Pseudomonadati
- Phylum: Pseudomonadota
- Class: Alphaproteobacteria
- Order: Caulobacterales
- Family: Maricaulaceae
- Genus: Marinicauda; Zhang et al. 2013

Species
- M. algicola M. pacifica M. salina

Genus of bacteria

Marinicauda is a genus of bacteria from the family of Maricaulaceae.
