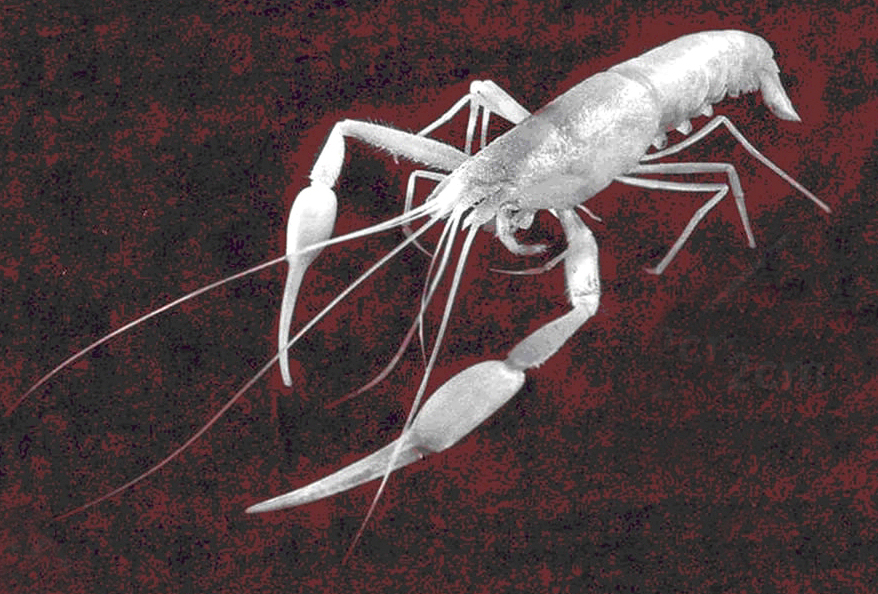

Conservation status
- Endangered (IUCN 3.1)

Scientific classification
- Kingdom: Animalia
- Phylum: Arthropoda
- Clade: Pancrustacea
- Class: Malacostraca
- Order: Decapoda
- Suborder: Pleocyemata
- Infraorder: Caridea
- Family: Typhlocarididae
- Genus: Typhlocaris
- Species: T. ayyaloni

Binomial name
- Typhlocaris ayyaloni Tsurnamal, 2008

= Typhlocaris ayyaloni =

Species of crustacean

Typhlocaris ayyaloni is a species of troglobitic shrimp in the family Typhlocarididae.

== Description ==
This species grows to 4 to 5 cm in length and is blind.

== Distribution ==
Typhlocaris ayyaloni species was discovered in 2008 in the Ayalon Cave in Israel, 100 meters below ground, with no natural access to the surface. It was found living in a small pool of sulphide-rich, brackish water. It is one of eight new species recently discovered in the area, the others being Tethysbaena ophelicola, Metacyclops longimaxillis, Metacyclops subdolus, Akrav israchanani (a land species, only found dead and also in other parts of the cave), Ayyalonia dimentmani (land species), Lepidospora ayyalonica (land species), and a still-unnamed species in the genus Collembola.

== Threats ==
This species is endangered as it is known only in the Yarkon-Taninim Aquifer, which is experiencing diminishing water levels. It is one of the main sources of water in Israel.

== See also ==
- Akrav israchanani
- Ayyalonia dimentmani
