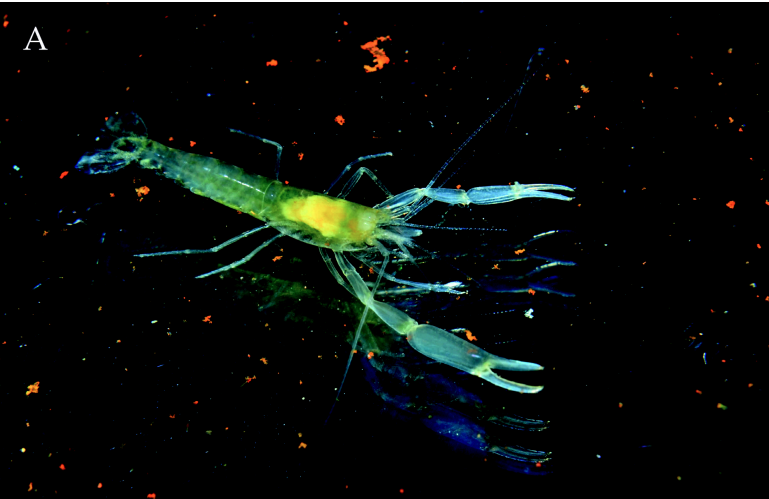

Scientific classification
- Kingdom: Animalia
- Phylum: Arthropoda
- Clade: Pancrustacea
- Class: Malacostraca
- Order: Decapoda
- Suborder: Pleocyemata
- Infraorder: Caridea
- Family: Euryrhynchidae
- Genus: Eurindicus
- Species: E. bhugarbha

Binomial name
- Eurindicus bhugarbha de Grave et al. 2018
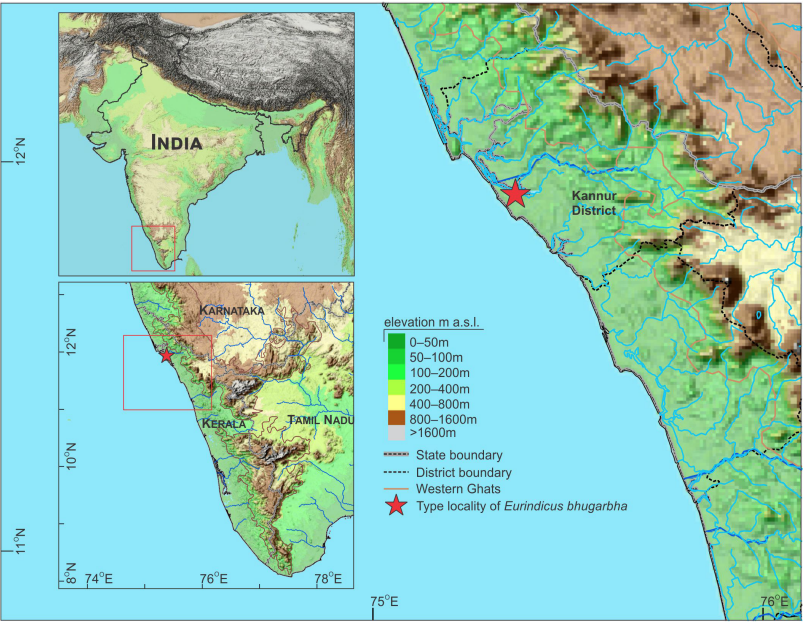
- Type locality

= Eurindicus =

Genus of shrimp

Eurindicus is a genus of subterranean shrimp in the family Euryrhynchidae. Its only species is Eurindicus bhugarbha, known from a single location in Kerala. It is the only member of its family found in Asia. The species is related to Troglindicus phreaticus, found in the Ratnagiri caves of Maharashtra.
