= Ayalon Cave =

Cave near Ramla, Israel

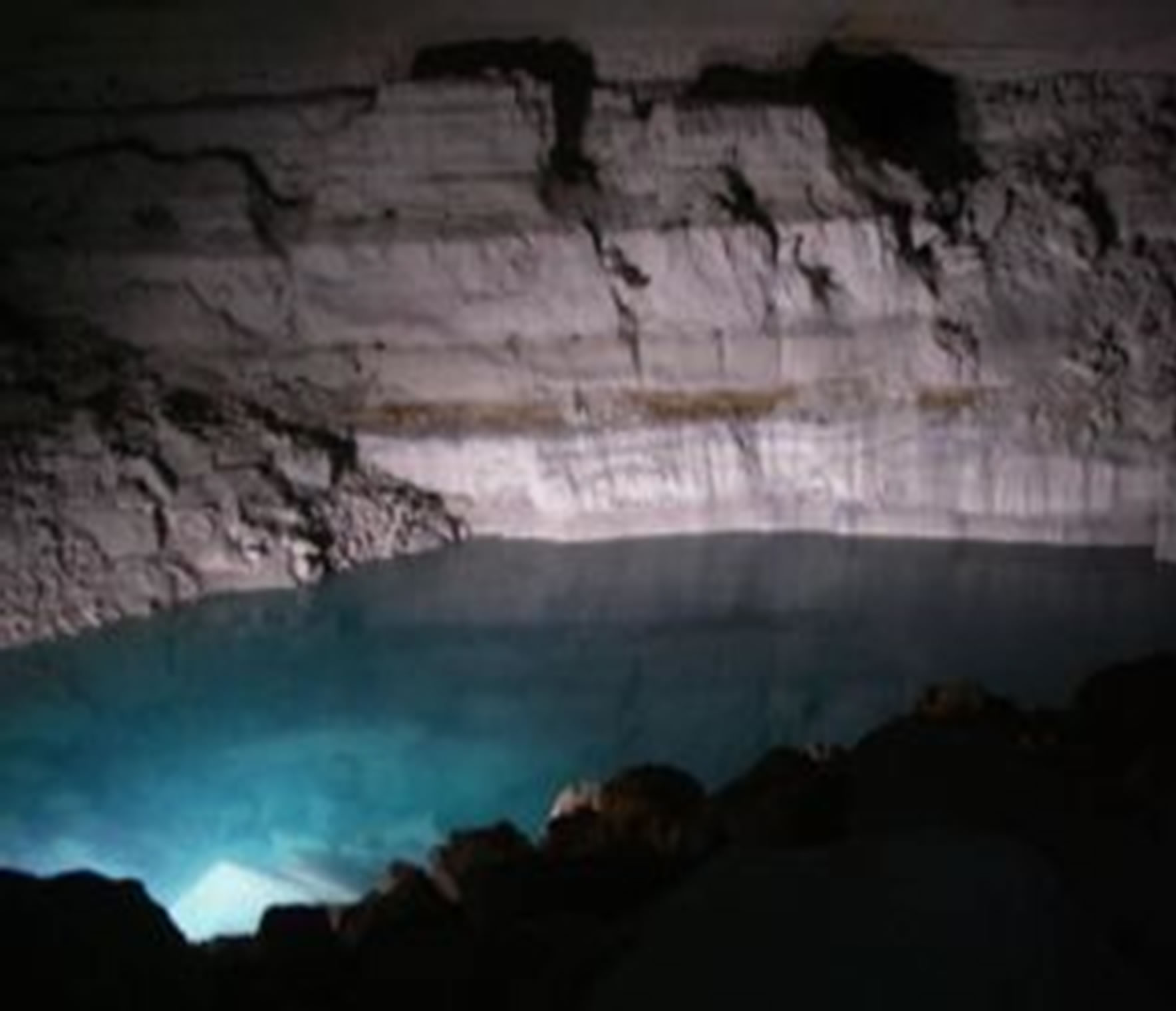
- Large chamber with cave lake in Ayalon Cave

- Location within Central Israel
- Location: Ramla, Israel
- Coordinates: 31°54′37″N 34°55′39″E
- Depth: 100 metres (330 ft)
- Length: 2,700 metres (8,900 ft)
- Discovery: 2006
- Geology: Limestone

The Ayalon Cave, in academic papers spelled Ayyalon Cave (Hebrew: מערת איילון), is a large limestone cave near Ramla, Israel, with a worldwide unique ecosystem. As photosynthesis is not possible inside the completely dark cave, the food chain that developed inside is solely based on bacteria capable of chemosynthesis: the bacteria are consuming the inorganic matter available in the groundwater, and then themselves become the organic food source for the rest of the food chain. As of 2021, Ayalon Cave was one of less than 10 such subterranean ecosystems known in the world, with each of them being distinctly different from the rest. Eight new invertebrate species were discovered there in April 2006 - four seawater and freshwater crustaceans along with four terrestrial animals, one of them a species of blind scorpion – with many more expected to be discovered.

== Arabic name of the area ==
The fact that the general site which includes the cave has a significant number of caves and caverns was, according to Israeli historian Roy Marom, already known to the ancients. In 2022 he interpreted the fact that the wider site was recorded in the 16th century as Mazraʽat šīḥa (Mazra'at Shikha), a term derived from the Aramaic word šyḥ’ and resulting in the meaning of "the farm of the pit, cavity, ditch", as a consequence of the transmission of toponyms and topographic knowledge over centuries. This is, however, not the only interpretation: In the 19th century, the wider site was known as muġur šīḥa ("Shikha Caves"), which was seen by John Edward Dinsmore and Gustaf Dalman in their 1911 article on the flora of Palestine, as referring to a shrub, šīḥ (shikh), the Arabic nomen unitatis of Artemisia herba-alba (white wormwood), the resulting name translating to "Farm of the white wormwood".

== Significance ==
According to Professor Amos Frumkin of the Hebrew University, the cave is unique in that a thick layer of limestone left it impermeable to any water coming from the surface. It has been studied for its complex food web, which survived for millions of years without light or organic food coming in from the surface, being based solely on a type of bacterium which feeds on sulfur which serves as the only organic matter available for the next higher level of organisms to feed on. The cave has offered an ecological refuge for species whose relatives living at the surface have been wiped out by climatic changes and catastrophic events over millions of years, and offers a unique sample for the study of long-term ecological changes in the area.

== Discovery and description ==
The cave itself was discovered in 2006 when a small opening was discerned in the quarry.

The cave, 100 metres (330 ft) deep, extends 2,700 metres (8,900 ft) including its branches, which makes it the third-largest limestone cave in Israel.

Various species found in the Ayalon Cave

Million years ago (the popular Times of Israel newspaper mentions the figure of five million years), the cave was cut off from the surface, forcing the creatures caught up inside to adapt to its specific conditions, characterised by complete darkness and the presence of sulfurous waters. The cave was geologically covered by a ca. 100 m thick layer of chalk. The almost impermeable rock isolated the cave from the photosynthetic surface, precluding percolation of water, organic matter, and nutrients. This only changed in 2006, when quarrying activities truncated the insulating cap rock.

== Ecosystem ==
=== Photosynthesis-free food chain ===
As the cave was completely cut off from the outside environment, it sustained an independent ecosystem; this ecosystem relied for an energy source neither on sunlight and photosynthesis, nor on an external source of organic compounds. Rather, energy was extracted by chemotrophic bacteria, living in a film on top of the water of an underground lake. These bacteria produce energy by oxidizing the sulfide compounds in the water, and derive organic compounds using carbon dioxide from the air. These compounds form the basis of the cave's ecosystem.

The temperature and salt content of the cave's water indicates that it originates from sources deep underground. Although this cave is part of an aquifer fed by rain falling in the mountains to the east, which happens to be one of the main potable water sources for Israel and the Palestinian territories, chemically more complex sources can create local pockets with very specific water composition.

=== New species ===
Researchers announced that they had discovered eight species previously unknown to science, all without eyes, comprising four aquatic crustacean species and four other species of terrestrial crustaceans and springtails.

A species of eyeless troglobitic scorpion representing an unknown taxonomic family was discovered only a decade or so after its extinction. This was probably caused by overpumping of the ground water, which has led the underground lake to shrink, and with it the food supply to dwindle. The ten specimen found dead in the cave are exceptionally well preserved and allowed the conclusion that they used a motion detecting organ situated on their abdomen for orientation. The species was given the name Akrav israchanani, from the Hebrew word for scorpion, "akrav", and honouring the researchers who identified it, Israel Naaman and Hanan Dimentman.

== 2021 destruction threat averted ==
The cave is located on the premises of a limestone quarry owned by the cement manufacturing Nesher Industries. As of 2021, a new railway line required that the Ayalon River valley be narrowed, and the National Infrastructure Committee together with the Water Authority were planning to divert runoff water in winter so as to avoid flooding by the Ayalon River, the quarry with the Ayalon Cave having been proposed as a possible catchment pool. Various scientists and the Israel Nature and Parks Authority have been opposed to the idea, with an online public signature collection supporting their position.

Scientists argued that a massive influx of surface runoff water, which is totally different from the groundwater on which the unique cave ecosystem is based, would be sure to destroy it. The intervention by Israeli and foreign researchers and the public petition has saved the cave's ecosystem, the authorities deciding for a different technical solution.

== Access ==
The cave is not accessible to the public. Only a small number of researchers are allowed to enter.

== See also ==
- Ophel biome, proposed worldwide biome supporting similar ecosystems
  - Similar caves where life partly or fully depends on chemosynthesis: Movile Cave in Romania, the first one identified, Ein-Nur Cave (Israel), Frasassi Caves (Italy), Melissotrypa Cave (Elassona municipality, Greece), Tashan Cave (Iran), caves in the Sharo-Argun Valley in the Caucasus Mountains, Lower Kane Cave, Cesspool Cave (Wyoming and Alleghany County, VA, USA), and Villa Luz Cave (Mexico).
  - Typhlocaris galilea, cave-dwelling blind shrimp and relative of one of the Ayalon Cave species, found only in Ein-Nur Cave
- Subterranean fauna
  - Troglofauna, small animals living in caves
  - Stygofauna, fauna living in groundwater and aquifers
- Nesher Ramla Homo, hominin population whose fossils were discovered in the same area
- Nesher-Ramla hiding complexes (1st century BCE-1st c. CE; 55 of them) also discovered within the Nesher quarry
- Soreq Cave, relatively nearby show cave
- Geography of Israel
- Wildlife of Israel
