= Euryhalocaulis =

Scientific classification
- Domain: Bacteria
- Kingdom: Pseudomonadati
- Phylum: Pseudomonadota
- Class: Alphaproteobacteria
- Order: Caulobacterales
- Family: Maricaulaceae
- Genus: Euryhalocaulis; Deng et al. 2013

Species
- E. caribicus

Genus of bacteria

Euryhalocaulis is a Gram-negative, chemoorganotrophic and aerobic genus of bacteria from the family of Maricaulaceae with one known species (Euryhalocaulis caribicus). Euryhalocaulis caribicus has been isolated from surface water of the Caribbean Sea.
