= Malcham Cave =

Salt cave in Israel

- מערת מלח"ם (Hebrew)
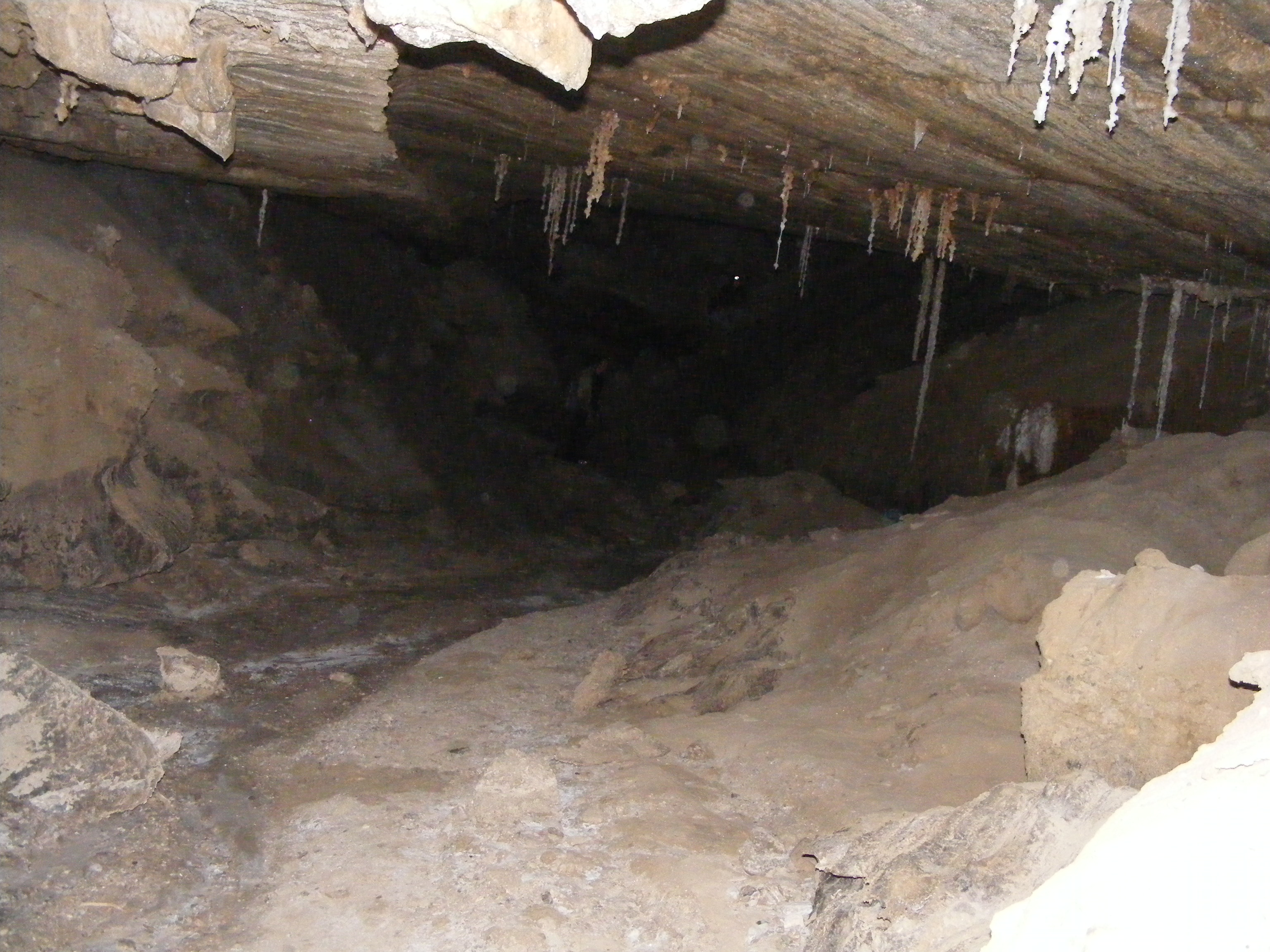

- Location within Northern Negev region of Israel
- Location: Tamar Regional Council
- Coordinates: 31°07′19″N 35°23′00″E
- Length: 10 km (6.2 mi)
- Discovery: 2019
- Geology: Salt cave
- Entrances: 24
- Access: Restricted
- Features: Stalactites, stalagmites

Malcham Cave (Hebrew: מערת מלח"ם) is the longest salt cave in the world, located in Mount Sodom, by the Dead Sea, Israel.

== History ==
In March 2019 it has been revealed, by an international team, led by the Israeli geologist professor Amos Frumkin, after a second measurement that its length is almost two times longer than was measured back in the 1980s.

== Structure ==
The cave was measured over a period of two years and has a length of over 10 km (6.2 mi) that will continue to increase as more salt dissolves. The salt cave that was previously thought to be the longest was the 6.85 km (4.26 mi)-long Cave of the Three Nudes, located on Qeshm Island in Iran.

== See also ==
- Geology of Israel
- List of longest caves by country
