= Oceanicaulis =

Scientific classification
- Domain: Bacteria
- Kingdom: Pseudomonadati
- Phylum: Pseudomonadota
- Class: Alphaproteobacteria
- Order: Caulobacterales
- Family: Maricaulaceae
- Genus: Oceanicaulis; Strömpl et al. 2003

Species
- Oceanicaulis alexandrii Strömpl et al. 2003; Oceanicaulis stylophorae Chen et al. 2012

Genus of bacteria

Oceanicaulis is a genus of bacteria in the family Maricaulaceae.
