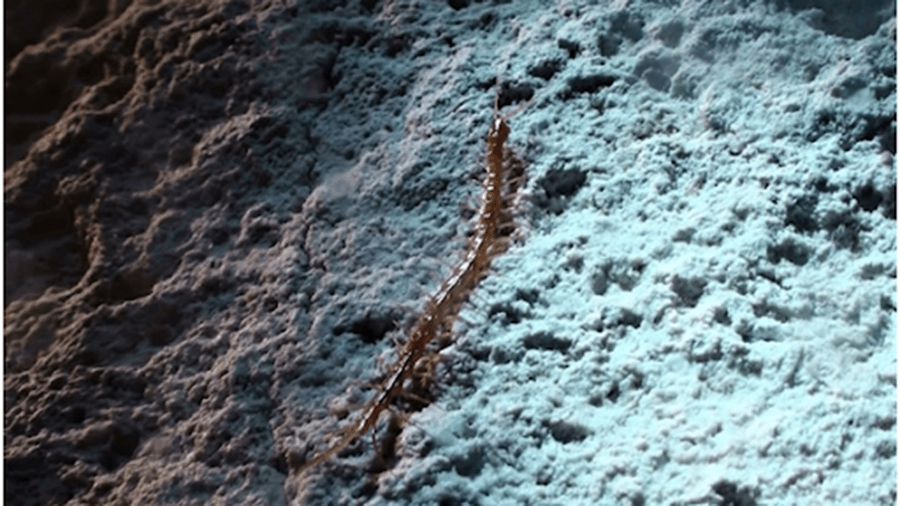

Scientific classification
- Domain: Eukaryota
- Kingdom: Animalia
- Phylum: Arthropoda
- Subphylum: Myriapoda
- Class: Chilopoda
- Order: Scolopendromorpha
- Family: Cryptopidae
- Genus: Cryptops
- Species: C. speleorex

Binomial name
- Cryptops speleorex Vahtera, Stoev & Akkari, 2020

= Cryptops speleorex =

Species of cave-dwelling centipede

Cryptops speleorex is a species of troglobitic centipede in the family Cryptopidae. It is endemic to the Movile Cave, Romania, where it was discovered in 2020.

== Appearance ==
C. speleorex grows to roughly 52 millimetres (2.0 in).

== Ecology ==
C. speleorex is the largest invertebrate animal that lives in Movile Cave. It feeds on other arthropods, such as isopods, spiders, small beetles, and diplura.
