= Desmocaris =

Scientific classification
- Domain: Eukaryota
- Kingdom: Animalia
- Phylum: Arthropoda
- Class: Malacostraca
- Order: Decapoda
- Suborder: Pleocyemata
- Infraorder: Caridea
- Family: Desmocarididae
- Genus: Desmocaris; Sollaud, 1911

Genus of crustaceans

Desmocaris, also referred to as Nigerian Floating Shrimp, is a genus of crustaceans belonging to the monotypic family Desmocarididae.

The species of this genus are found in Central Africa and in the forest zone of West Africa.

Species:

- Desmocaris bislineata Powell, 1977
- Desmocaris bisliniata Powell, 1977
- Desmocaris trispinosa (Aurivillius, 1898)
