= Woodsholea =

Scientific classification
- Domain: Bacteria
- Kingdom: Pseudomonadati
- Phylum: Pseudomonadota
- Class: Alphaproteobacteria
- Order: Caulobacterales
- Family: Maricaulaceae
- Genus: Woodsholea; Abraham et al. 2004

Species
- M. maritima

Genus of bacteria

Woodsholea is a genus of bacteria from the family of Maricaulaceae with one known species (Woodsholea maritima).
