= Amos Frumkin =

Israeli geologist and speleologist

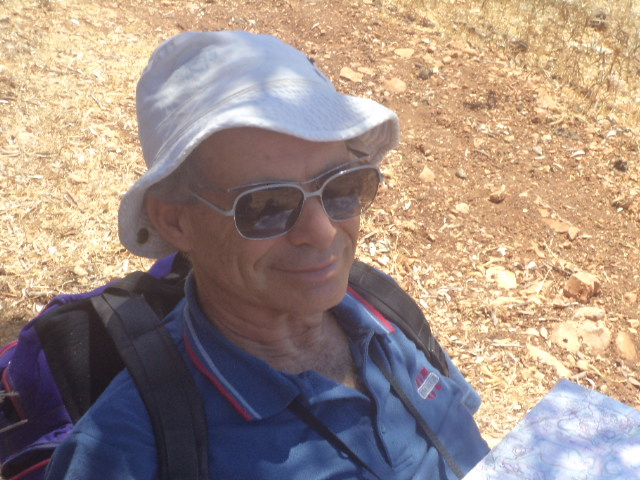
Amos Frumkin

Amos Frumkin (Hebrew: עמוס פרומקין; born in 1953) is an Israeli geologist, speleologist, and professor of geology at the Hebrew University of Jerusalem.

Frumkin was born in Tel Aviv, Israel, in 1953. His expertise is the geology of caves. As an active speleologist, he founded and directs the Cave Research Center of the Hebrew University in Jerusalem.

== Research ==
Frumkin's research fields cover karst, cave morphology, environment, and sediments, as indicators of palaeoclimate, palaeohydrology, geological history, tectonics, karst aquifers and human evolution. He also studies underground ancient water supply systems. He uses earth-sciences methods, such as radiometric dating and stable isotopes, collaborating with archaeologists, biologists and karstologists around the globe. He has authored or co-authored over 100-refereed articles and seven books.

Frumkin's Ph.D. thesis on "The karst system of the Mount Sedom salt diapir" focused on karst geomorphology and hydrology of this salt diapir, and its palaeoclimatic implications. This was the first karst research performed in salt.

Most of Frumkin's studies are performed on karst terrains in diverse fields of research, comprising palaeoclimate, geomorphology, hydrology, palaeohydrology, geoarchaeology, human impact on the environment and ancient water systems. The research is mostly associated with underground (speleological) features studied using earth-sciences methods. He studies the underground interface between geoscience, geography, environment, and archaeology. An interdisciplinary and trans-disciplinary view of the sub-surface is achieved by wide-scale interaction and cooperation with scientists in various fields. The research has been performed mainly in Israel, complemented with research in other countries such as Jordan, United Emirates, and Bulgaria. Additional collection of data is done over the globe, resulting in a global karst geomorphology volume. Some of the research is performed in underground laboratories in which measuring equipment was installed. Within an underground laboratory in Sedom Cave, salt cave speleogenetic processes are monitored for since 1980’s. Much of the data collection is performed by graduate students.

Caves are treated as living organisms, with birth (initiation, inception), complex life history involving hydrogeologic, palaeoclimatic, biologic and anthropogenic processes, culminating in cave 'death' during which the cave is obliterated by filling or erosion. All these stages and processes are tackled in Frumkin’s studies.

His data and interpretation often changed the previously accepted paradigm, becoming the new, widely accepted 'common knowledge'. For example: (a) Oxygen isotopes fluctuations over glacial/interglacial periods in Levantine speleothems are dominated by 'source effect', consequently glacials were wetter than interglacials (rather than drier as was thought earlier, according to oxygen isotopes); (b) Hypogenic source of the 'Ayyalon salinity anomaly' (rather than an upper source); (c) Salt dissolution as the major undermining source of Dead Sea sinkholes (rather than earlier piping concept); (d) Natural caves have been widely used for refuge in the Mediterranean zone of Israel (rather than only in the desert); (e) Speleothems have been used in Israel in the past for production of 'calcite alabaster' luxury items (rather than only imported from Israel).

=== Karst ===
Frumkin studies the recharge vadose zone at the mountains in central Israel, concentrating on recharge through karst shafts and cave drips injecting water and potentially pollution into the aquifer. The integration of recharge over catchment areas is studied using spring monitoring and models. Much of the research is focused in the phreatic, confined and hypogenic parts of the aquifers. It is found that most 's carbonate caves have initiated and developed to full size under such conditions. Aging and dying stages of cave life are studied through excavations in filled caves.

Caves preserve unique records of the geological history of their region. They form along structural lines, they are deformed and uplifted with the rock, and they preserve ancient sediments with geological records. Frumkin studied such features of tectonics, diapir rising rates and morphostructure of the Dead Sea basin and its shoulders.

=== Palaeoclimate ===
Frumkin has obtained detailed well-dated climatic records for the mid-late Quaternary in Israel. The results solve some important questions on climate change during the Quaternary in the Levant and other regions, and how it could/would influence humans, and the nature of climatic belts migration during glacial/interglacial cycles. The answers obtained have direct impact on understanding present and future climatic change. The palaeoclimatic studies were extended to lava tubes in Jordan, ancient wood preserved in caves, and to stromatolite caves in the Dead Sea basin. Paleoclimate records were obtained for various climatic regions, from Mt. Hermon, where freezing and thawing periods were reconstructed, through the northern-central Dead Sea catchment, where glacials were shown to be wetter than interglacials. The last interglacial was shown to be extreme in several ways, indicating possible scenarios of future warming. Environmental catastrophes during the Holocene received particular attention, due to their relevance to present and future global change.

=== Geoarchaeology ===
Among the co-authored studies are: Dating of early Paleolithic cave inhabitants; evidence for habitual use of fire at the end of the Lower Paleolithic; paleoclimatic corridors for human migration out of Africa; dating ancient Jerusalem water supply system; technical innovations to bring water into ancient cities; Extending the knowledge on Bar-Kokhba Revolt, ~1900 yr ago, through remains including papyrus documents and hoards of coins from caves; Comparing field evidence with historic and archaeologic records. In 2003, Frumkin led a team that radiometrically-dated Siloam Tunnel. He is the author of the generally accepted explanation of how a tunnel dug by two teams working from opposite ends was engineered by the ancient Israelites before the development of trigonometry. He found for the first time that calcite-alabaster was produced in Israel and not only imported from Egypt.

== Published works ==
=== Books ===
- Frumkin, A. 1984, Karst Shafts in a Mediterranean Environment (Hebrew): Jerusalem, The Hebrew University of Jerusalem and the Society for the Protection of Nature in Israel, Jerusalem, 141 pp.
- Frumkin, A., 1992. The karst system of . (Hebrew):, The Hebrew of and the Society for the Protection of Nature in Israel, 216 pp.
- Donini, G., Rossi, A., Forti, P., Buzio, A., Calandri, G. and Frumkin, A., 1985, Monte Sedom, Societa Speleologica Italiana, Milano, 135 p.
- Rubin, R., Frumkin, A. and Felsenstein, D., 1999, Multifaces of Geography (Hebrew): Ariel v. 140-141, 383 p.
- Frumkin, A., 2006, Proceedings of the Geographical Society Conference (Hebrew), 116 p.
- Frumkin, A., ed., Shroder J.F. ed. in chief, 2013, Karst Geomorphology, Volume 6, in: Treatise on Geomorphology, San Diego, Elsevier, Academic Press, 483 p.
- Frumkin, A., ed., 2015, Atlas of the Holey Land - Judean Desert Caves. Magnes, 458 pp (Hebrew).
- Chavez, T., Reehling, P., Johnston, C., Klimchouk, A., Frumkin, A., eds., 2016: Proceedings of deepkarst 2016: origins, resources, and management of hypogene karst. National cave and karst research institute Symposium 6 Carlsbad, NM, USA

=== Refereed journal papers ===
- Frumkin, Amos and Shimron, Aryeh, Tunnel engineering in the Iron Age: Geoarchaeology of the Siloam Tunnel, Jerusalem, Journal of Archaeological Science, vol. 33, no. 2, February 2006, Pages 227-237.
- Frumkin, A., Magaritz, M., Carmi, I. and Zak, I., 1991, The Holocene climatic record of the salt caves of Mount Sedom, Israel: Holocene, v. 1, 3, p. 191-200.
- Frumkin, A., 1993, Karst origin of the upper erosion surface in the Northern Judean Mountains, Israel: Israel Journal of Earth Sciences, v. 41, p. 169-176.
- Frumkin, A., 1994, Hydrology and denudation rates of halite karst: Journal of Hydrology, v. 162, 1-2, p. 171-189.
- Frumkin, A., 1994, Morphology and development of salt caves: Journal of Caves and Karst Studies (NSS Bull.), v. 56, p. 82-95.
- Frumkin, A., Schwarcz, H. P. and Ford, D. C., 1994, Evidence for isotopic equilibrium in stalagmites from caves in a dry region: Jerusalem, Israel: Israel Journal of Earth Sciences, v. 43, 3-4, p. 221-230.
- Frumkin, A. and Ford, D. C., 1995, Rapid entrenchment of stream profiles in the salt caves of Mount Sedom, Israel: Earth Surface Processes and Landforms, v. 20, p. 139-152.
- Frumkin, A., 1996, Determining the exposure age of a karst landscape: Quaternary Research, v. 46, p. 99-106.
- Frumkin, A., 1996, Structure of northern Mount Sedom salt diapir (Israel) from cave evidence and surface morphology: Israel Journal of Earth Sciences, v. 45, p. 73-80.
- Frumkin, A., 1996, Uplift rate relative to base level of a salt diapir (Dead Sea, Israel), as indicated by cave levels, in Alsop, I., Blundell, D. and Davison, I., eds., Salt Tectonics, Geological Society of London SP v. 100, p. 41-47.
- Frumkin, A., 1998, Salt cave cross-sections and their paleoenvironmental implications: Geomorphology, v. 23, p. 183-191.
- Frumkin, A., Shimron, A. E. and Miron, Y., 1998, Karst morphology across a steep climatic gradient, southern Mount Hermon, Israel: Zeitschrift für Geomorphologie Supplementband, v. 109, p. 23-40.
- Frumkin, A., 1999, Interaction between karst, water, and agriculture over the climatic gradient of Israel: International Journal of Speleology, v. 28B, 1, p. 99-110.
- Frumkin, A., Carmi, I., Gopher, A., Ford, D.C., Schwarcz, H.P. and Tsuk, T., 1999. A Holocene millennial-scale climatic cycle from a speleothem in Nahal Qanah Cave, Israel. The Holocene, 9(6), pp. 677–682.
- Frumkin, A., Ford, D. C. and Schwarcz, H. P., 1999, Continental oxygen isotopic record of the last 170,000 years in Jerusalem: Quaternary Research, v. 51, 3, p. 317-327.
- Frumkin, A., Ford, D. C. and Schwarcz, H. P., 2000, Paleoclimate and vegetation of the last glacial cycles in Jerusalem from a speleothem record: Global Biogeochemical Cycles, v. 14, 3, p. 863-870.
- Frumkin, A., 2001, The Cave of the Letters sediments — Indication of an early phase of the Dead Sea depression?: Journal of Geology, v. 109, 1, p. 79-90.
- Frumkin, A. and Elitzur, Y., 2001, The Rise and Fall of the Dead Sea: Biblical Archaeology Review, v. 27, 6, p. 42-50.
- Frumkin, A., Kadan, G., Enzel, Y., and Eyal, Y., 2001, Radiocarbon chronology of the Holocene Dead Sea: Attempting a regional correlation: Radiocarbon, v. 43, 2C, p. 1179-1190.
- Frumkin, A. and Raz, E., 2001, Collapse and subsidence associated with salt karstification along the Dead Sea: Carbonates and Evaporites, v. 16, 2, p. 117-130.
- Frumkin, A., 2002, The hydrogeology of Israel and the problem of water supply in antiquity: Journal of Roman Archaeology SS, v. 46, p. 21-24 (review).
- Frumkin, A. and Elitzur, Y., 2002, Historic Dead Sea level fluctuations calibrated with geological and archaeological evidence: Quaternary Research, v. 57, p. 334-342.
- Frumkin, A., 2002, The water-supply network of Samaria-Sebaste: The Aqueducts of Israel, Amit, D., Patrich, J., Hirschfeld, Y., Eds., Journal of Roman Archaeology SS, v. 46, p. 267-277.
- Frumkin, A., 2002, Mount Sedom caves: underground drainage of runoff through a salt karst system (Hebrew): Studies in the Geography of Israel, v. 16, p. 339-361.
- Frumkin, A., Shimron, A. and Rosenbaum, J., 2003, Radiometric dating of the Siloam Tunnel, Jerusalem: Nature, v. 425, p. 169-171.
- Frumkin, A., 2003, Maximum downcutting rate of bedrock channels in hyper-arid climates: Horizons in Geography, v. 57-58, p. 242-249 (Hebrew).
- Frumkin, A. and Stein, M., 2004, The Sahara - East Mediterranean dust and climate connection revealed by strontium and uranium isotopes in a Jerusalem speleothem: Earth and Planetary Science Letters v. 217 p. 451-464.
- Frumkin, A., and Fischhendler, I., 2005, Morphometry and distribution of isolated caves as a guide for phreatic and confined paleohydrological conditions. Geomorphology, v. 67, p. 457-471.
- Frumkin, A., and Gvirtzman, H., 2006, Cross-formational rising groundwater at an artesian karstic basin: the Ayalon Saline Anomaly, Israel: Journal of Hydrology, v. 318, 316–333.
- Frumkin, A., Bar-Matthews, M., Vaks, A., 2008, Paleoenvironment of Jawa basalt plateau, Jordan, inferred from calcite speleothems from a lava tube, Quaternary Research, 70, 3, 358-367.
- Fischhendler, I. and Frumkin, A., 2008. Distribution, evolution and morphology of caves in south-western Samaria, Israel. Israel Journal of Earth Sciences; 57: 311–322.
- Frumkin, A., 2009, Formation and dating of a salt pillar in Mount Sedom diapir, Israel: Geological Society of America Bulletin; v. 121; no. 1/2; p. 286–293.
- Frumkin, A., 2009. Stable isotopes of a subfossil Tamarix tree from the Dead Sea region, Israel, and their implications for the Intermediate Bronze Age environmental crisis. Quaternary Research, 71, 319–328.
- Frumkin, A., 2009, How Lot's wife became a pillar of salt. Biblical Archaeology Review 35:3, 38-64.
- Frumkin, A., Karkanas, P., Bar-Matthews, M., Barkai, R., Gopher, A., Shahack-Gross, R., and Vaks, A., 2009, Gravitational deformations and fillings of aging caves: the example of Qesem karst system, Israel: Geomorphology, 106, 154–164.
- Frumkin, A., Bar-Yosef, O., and Schwarcz, H. P. 2011, Possible paleohydrologic and paleoclimatic effects on hominin migration and occupation of the Levantine Middle Paleolithic. Journal of Human Evolution 60:4 437-451.
- Frumkin, A., Ezersky, M., Al-Zoubi, A., Abueladas, A.-R. (2011). The Dead Sea sinkhole hazard: Geophysical assessment of salt dissolution and collapse. Geomorphology 134, 102–117.
- Frumkin, A. Zaidner, Y., Na'aman, I., Tsatskin, A., Porat, N., Vulfson, L., 2015. Sagging and collapse sinkholes over hypogenic hydrothermal karst in a carbonate terrain. Geomorphology 229, 45-57. DOI: 10.1016/j.geomorph.2014.08.001
- Frumkin, A., Langford, B., Marder, O., & Ullman, M. (2016). Paleolithic caves and hillslope processes in south-western Samaria, Israel: Environmental and archaeological implications. Quaternary International, 398, 246-258.
- Frumkin, A., Langford, B., Lisker, S., Amrani, A., 2017, Hypogenic karst at the Arabian platform margins: implications for far-field groundwater systems: Bulletin of the Geological Society of America 129 (11-12): 1636-1659. DOI: 10.1130/B31694.1.
- Frumkin, A. 2017. The underground water systems of Ma'abarta – Flavia Neapolis, Israel. Geoarchaeology, 33:127–140.
- Frumkin, A., Aharon, S., Davidovich, U., Langford, B., Negev, Y., Ullman, M., Vaks, A., Ya‘aran, S., Zissu, B., 2018. Old and recent processes in a warm and humid desert hypogene cave: ‘A’rak Na‘asane, Israel. International Journal of Speleology 47, 307-321. doi.org/10.5038/1827-806X.47.3.2178
- Frumkin A., Naor, R., 2019. Formation and modification of pit craters – example from the Golan volcanic plateau, southern Levant. Zeitschrift für Geomorphologie.
- Frumkin, A., Comay, O., 2019. The last glacial cycle of the southern Levant: Paleoenvironment and chronology of modern humans, Journal of Human Evolution, doi.org/10.1016/j.jhevol.2019.04.007
- Frumkin, A., Barzilai, O., Hershkovitz, I., Ullman, M., Marder, O., 2019. Karst terrain in the western upper Galilee, Israel: Speleogenesis, hydrogeology and human preference of Manot Cave, Journal of Human Evolution, doi.org/10.1016/j.jhevol.2019.05.006

=== Refereed co-authored journal papers ===
- Forti, P., Buzio, A. and Frumkin, A., 1984, Le concrezioni de sale nelle grotte del Monte Sedom (Israele): Rivista Mineralogica Italiana v. 2, p. 45-48.
- Vaks, A., Bar-Matthews, M., Ayalon, A., Schilman, B., Gilmour, M., Hawkesworth, C. J., Frumkin, A., Kaufman, A. and Matthews, A., 2003, Paleoclimate reconstruction based on the timing of speleothem growth, oxygen and carbon isotope composition from a cave located in the rain shadow in Israel: Quaternary Research, v. 59, p. 182-193.
- Elitzur, Y. and Frumkin, A., 2003, The level of the Dead Sea and the Bible: Al Atar, v. 12, p. 83-98 (Hebrew).
- Barkai, R., Gopher, A., Lauritzen, S. E. and Frumkin, A. 2003, Uranium series dates from Qesem Cave, Israel, and the end of the Lower Palaeolithic: Nature, v. 423, p. 977-979.
- Pe'eri, S., Zebker, H. A., Ben-Avraham, Z., Frumkin, A., and Hall, J. K., 2004, Spatially-resolved uplift rate of the Mount Sedom (Dead Sea) salt diapir from InSAR observations: Israel Journal of Earth Sciences, v. 53, no. 2, p. 99-106.
- Weinberger, R., Begin, Z. B., Waldmann, N., Gardosh, M., Baer, G., Frumkin, A., and Wdowinski, S., 2006, Quaternary rise of the Sedom Diapir, Dead Sea basin, in Enzel, Y., Agnon, A., and Stein, M., eds., New frontiers in Dead Sea paleoenvironmental research, GSA Special Paper 401: Boulder, GSA, p. 33-51.
- Vaks, A., Bar-Matthews, M., Ayalon, A., Matthews, A., Frumkin, A., Dayan, U., Halicz, L., Almogi-Labin, A., and Schilman, B., 2006, Paleoclimate and location of the border between Mediterranean climate region and the Saharo–Arabian Desert as revealed by speleothems from the northern Negev Desert, Israel: Earth and Planetary Science Letters, v. 249, 384–399.
- Porat, R., Eshel, H., Frumkin, A., 2006. . Two Groups of Coins from the Bar Kokhba War from Ein-Gedi: Israel Numismatic Journal v. 15, 79-86.
- Lisker, S., Porat, R., Davidovich, U., Eshel, H., Lauritzen, S.E, Frumkin, A., 2007, Late Quaternary environmental and human events at En Gedi, reflected by the geology and archaeology of the Moringa Cave (Dead Sea area, Israel), Quaternary Research, v. 68, 203–212.
- Vaks, A., Bar-Matthews, M., Ayalon, A., Matthews, A., Halicz, L. and Frumkin, A., 2007, Desert speleothems reveal climatic window for African exodus of early modern humans, Geology v. 35:9, 831-834.
- Porat, R., Frumkin, A., Davidovich, U., Shai, I., Eshel, H., 2007, The Moringa Cave at the En-Gedi oasis, Qadmoniot v. 40:133, 27-31 (Hebrew).
- Karkanas, P., Shahack-Gross, R., Ayalon, A., Bar-Matthews, M., Barkai, R., Frumkin, A., Gopher, A., and Stiner, M. C., 2007, Evidence for habitual use of fire at the end of the Lower Paleolithic: Site formation processes at Qesem Cave, Israel: Journal of Human Evolution, 53, 197-212.
- Porat, R., Eshel, H., Frumkin, A., 2007. Finds from the Bar-Kochba revolt from two caves at En Gedi: Palestine Exploration Quarterly, 139, 1, 35–53.
- Porat, R., Eshel, H., Frumkin, A., bronze scribe's case from En Gedi. Israel Museum Studies in Archaeology 6, 3-12.
- Lisker, S., Vaks, A., Bar-Matthews, M., Porat, R., Frumkin, A., 2009 Stromatolites in caves of the Dead Sea Fault Escarpment: implications to latest Pleistocene lake levels and tectonic subsidence, Quaternary Science Reviews, 28, 1-2, 80-92.
- Porat, R., Eshel, H., Frumkin, A., 2009. The 'Caves of the Spear': Refuge caves from the Bar-Kokhba revolt north of 'En-Gedi. Israel Exploration Journal 59,1, 21-46.
- Zissu, B., Eshel, H., Stiebel, G.D., Porat, R., Langford, B., Davidovich, U., Frumkin, A., 2009. Finds from the Bar Kokhba period in the western Jerusalem Hills. (Hebrew) Qadmoniot 42:138, 118-121.
- Sheffer, N., Dafny, E., Gvirtzman, H., Navon, S., Frumkin, A, Morin, E., 2010. Hydrometeorological daily recharge assessment model (DREAM) for the Western Mountain Aquifer, Israel: Model application and effects of temporal patterns. Water Resources Research 46, W05510, 16 pp, doi:10.1029/2008WR007607w.
- Lisker, S., Porat, R., Frumkin, A., 2010. Late Neogene rift valley fill sediments preserved in caves of the Dead Sea Fault Escarpment (Israel): palaeogeographic and morphotectonic implications. Sedimentology 57, 429–445.
- Benami Amiel, R., Grodek, T., Frumkin, A., 2010. Characterization of the hydrogeology of the sacred Gihon Spring, Jerusalem: A deteriorating urban karst spring. Hydrogeology Journal 18, 1465-1479.
- Lisker, S., Vaks, A., Bar-Matthews, M., Porat, R., and Frumkin, A. 2010. Late Pleistocene palaeoclimatic and palaeoenvironmental reconstruction of the Dead Sea area (Israel) based on speleothems and cave stromatolites. Quaternary Science Reviews 29, 1201–1211.
- Gopher, A., Ayalon, A., Bar-Matthews, M., Barkai, R., Frumkin, A., Karkanas, P. and Shahack-Gross, R. 2010. The chronology of the late Lower Paleolithic in the Levant: U-series dates of speleothems from Middle Pleistocene Qesem Cave, Israel. Quaternary Geochronology 5, 644-656.
- Zissu, B., Eshel, H., Langford, B., and Frumkin, A., 2010. Coins from the Bar Kokhba Revolt, hidden in Mearat Ha-Teomim (Mughâret Umm et Tûeimîn), Western Jerusalem Hills. Israel Numismatic Journal 17, 113-147.
- Vaks, A., Bar-Matthews, M., Matthews, A., Ayalon, A. and Frumkin, A., 2010. Middle-Late Quaternary paleoclimate of northern Saharan-Arabian Desert: reconstruction from speleothems of Negev Desert, Israel. Quaternary Science Reviews 29, 1201–1211.
- Zissu, B., Porat, R., Langford, B., and Frumkin, A., (2011), Archaeological Remains of the Bar Kokhba Revolt in the Te’omim Cave (Mŭghâret Umm et Tûeimîn), Western Jerusalem Hills. Journal of Jewish Studies 52,2, 262-283.
- Sheffer, N., Cohen, M., Morin, E., Grodek, T., Gimburg; A., Magal, E., Gvirtzman, H., Nied, M., Isele, D., Frumkin, A., (2011). Integrated Cave Drip Monitoring for Epikarst Recharge Estimation in a Dry Mediterranean Area, Sif Cave, Israel. Hydrological Processes 25, 2837-2845.
- Marder, O., Yeshurun, R., Lupu, R., Bar-Oz, G., Belmaker, M., Porat, N., Ron, H., and Frumkin, A. (2011). Mammal remains at Rantis Cave, Israel, and middle-late Pleistocene human subsistence and ecology in the Southern Levant. Journal of Quaternary Science 26(8) p. 769–780.
- Laskow, M., Gendler, M., Goldberg, I., Gvirtzman, H., and Frumkin, A. (2011). Deep confined karst detection, analysis and paleo-hydrology reconstruction at a basin-wide scale using new geophysical interpretation of borehole logs. Journal of Hydrology 406, p. 158–169.
- Weinstein-Evron, M., Tsatskin, A., Weiner, S., Shahack-Gross, R., Frumkin, A., Yeshurun, R., Zaidner, Y., Window into Early Middle Paleolithic Human Occupational Layers: Misliya Cave, Mount Carmel, Israel. PaleoAnthropology 2012:202−228. doi:10.4207/PA.2012.ART75
- Shimron A. E. and Frumkin, A., (2011). The Why, How, and When of the Siloam Tunnel Reevaluated: A Reply. BASOR 364, p. 53-60.
- Nadel, D., Shtober-Zisu, N., Frumkin, A., Yaroshevich, A., 2012. New Prehistoric Cave Sites in Lower Nahal Oren, Mt. Carmel, Israel. Mitekufat Haeven - Journal of the Israel Prehistoric Society 42:75-114.
- Goder-Goldberger M., Cheng H., Edwards R.L., Marder O., Peleg Y., Yeshurun R., Frumkin A., 2012, Emanuel Cave: the site and its bearing on early Middle Paleolithic technological variability. Paléorient, v. 38.1-2, p. 203-225.
- Ayalon, A., Bar-Matthews, M., Frumkin, A., Matthews, A. (2013). Last glacial warm events on Mount Hermon; the southern extension of the Alpine karst range of the east Mediterranean. Quaternary Science Reviews 59 p. 43-56
- Vaks, A., Woodhead, J., Bar-Matthews, M., Ayalon, A., Cliff, R., Zilberman, T., Matthews, A., and Frumkin, A. (2013). Pliocene-Pleistocene climate of the northern margin of Saharan-Arabian Desert recorded in speleothems from the Negev Desert, Israel. Earth and Planetary Science Letters 368 p. 88–100.
- Por, F. D., Dimentman, C., Frumkin, A., Naaman, I. (2013). Animal life in the chemoautotrophic ecosystem of the hypogenic groundwater cave of Ayyalon (Israel): A summing up. Natural Sciences 5:4A, p. 7-13.
- Ezersky, M., Frumkin A., (2013). Fault — Dissolution front relations and the Dead Sea sinkhole problem, Geomorphology 201, 35–44.
- Frumkin, A., Bar-Matthews, M., Davidovich, U., Langford B., Porat R., Ullman M., Zissu, B., (2014). In-situ dating of ancient quarries and the source of flowstone (‘calcite-alabaster’) artifacts in the southern Levant. Journal of Archaeological Science 41, 749-758.
- Marder, O., Alex, B., Ayalon, A., Bar-Matthews, Bar-Oz, G., Bar-Yosef Mayer, D., Berna, F., Boaretto, E., Caracuta, V., Frumkin, A., Goder-Goldberger, M., Hershkovitz, I., Latimer, B., Ron Lavi, Matthews, A., Weiner, S., Weiss, U., Yas'ur, G., Yeshurun, R., Barzilai, O., 2013. The Upper Palaeolithic of Manot Cave, Western Galilee, Israel: the 2011–12 excavations. Antiquity 087:337.
- Zaidner, Y., Frumkin, A., Porat, N., Tsatskin, A., Yeshurun, R., Weissbrod, L., 2014. A series of Mousterian occupations in a new type of site: The Nesher Ramla karst depression, Israel. Journal of Human Evolution 66, 1-17.
- Matmon, A., Fink, D., Davis, M., Niedermann, S., Rood, D., Frumkin, A., 2014. Unraveling rift margin evolution and escarpment development ages along the Dead Sea fault using cosmogenic burial ages. Quaternary Research 82, 281-295.
- Shivtiel, Y., Frumkin, A., 2014. The use of caves as security measures in the Early Roman Period in the Galilee: Cliff Settlements and Shelter Caves. Caderno de Geografia, 24, 41:77-85.
- Zissu, B., Langford, B., Raviv, D., Davidovich, U., Porat, R., Frumkin, A., 2014. Coins from the Elqana Cave in Western Samaria. The Israel Numismatic Journal 18, 146-154.
- Shtober-Zisu, N., Amasha, H., Frumkin, A. 2015. Inland notches: Implications for subaerial formation of karstic landforms—an example from the carbonate slopes of Mt. Carmel, Israel. Geomorphology 229, 85-99 DOI: 10.1016/j.geomorph.2014.09.004.
- Hershkovitz, I., Marder, O., Ayalon, A., Bar-Matthews, M., Yasur, G., Boaretto, E., Caracuta, V., Alex, B., Frumkin, A., Goder-Goldberger, M., Gunz, P., Holloway, R.L., Latimer, B., Lavi, R., Matthews, A., Slon, V., Bar-Yosef Mayer, D., Berna, F., Bar-Oz, G., Yeshurun, R., May, H., Hans, M.G., Weber, G.W., Barzilai, O., 2015, Levantine cranium from Manot Cave (Israel) foreshadows the first European modern humans. Nature, 520:216-219. doi:10.1038/nature14134.
- Marder, O. Ashkenazy, H. Frumkin, A. Grosman, L. Langford, B. Sharon, G. Ullman, M. Yeshurun, R. Peleg, Y. 2015. El-Hamam Cave: A New Natufian Site in the Samaria Hills. Mitekufat Haeven - Journal of the Israel Prehistoric Society 45, 131 -142
- Yahalom-Mack N., Langgut D., Dvir O., Tirosh O., Eliyahu-Behar A., Erel Y., Langford B., Frumkin A., Ullman M., Davidovich U. The earliest lead object in the Levant. 2015. PLOS One, 10(12), DOI:10.1371/journal.pone.0142948.
- Zissu, B., Langford, B., Porat, R., Frumkin, A., 2016. Coins from the Abud Cave in Southwestern Samaria from the Time of the Jewish Revolts against Rome. The Israel Numismatic Journal Vol. 19, pp 33–44.
- Zaidner, Y., Frumkin, A., Friesem, D., Tsatskin, A., & Shahack-Gross, R. (2016). Landscapes, depositional environments and human occupation at Middle Paleolithic open-air sites in the southern Levant, with new insights from Nesher Ramla, Israel. Quaternary Science Reviews, 138, 76-86.
- Sivan, D., Sisma-Ventura, G., Greenbaum, N., Bialik, O.M., Williams, F.H., Tamisiea, M.E., Rohling, E.J., Frumkin, A., Avnaim-Katav, S., Shtienberg, G. and Stein, M., 2016. Eastern Mediterranean sea levels through the last interglacial from a coastal-marine sequence in northern Israel. Quaternary Science Reviews, 145, pp. 204–225.
- Klein, E., Ullman, M., Porat, R., Langford, B., Frumkin, A., 2017. Kamon Cave: Refuge cave from the Wars of the Diadochi period. Qadmoniot 154, 104-108 (Hebrew).
- Audra, P., Bosák, P., Gázquez, F., Cailhol, D., Skála, R., Lisá, L., Jonásová, S., Frumkin, A., Knez, M., Slabe, T. and Hajna, N.Z., 2017. Bat urea-derived minerals in arid environment. First identification of allantoin, C_{4}H_{6}N_{4}O_{3} in Kahf Kharrat Najem Cave, United Arab Emirates. International Journal of Speleology, 46(1), p. 81-92.
- Shtober-Zisu, N., Amasha, H. and Frumkin, A., 2017. Inland notches: lithological characteristics and climatic implications of subaerial cavernous landforms in Israel. Earth Surface Processes and Landforms 42 1820-1832.
- Ezersky, M.G. and Frumkin, A., 2017. Evaluation and mapping of Dead Sea coastal aquifers salinity using Transient Electromagnetic (TEM) resistivity measurements. Comptes Rendus Geoscience, 349(1), pp. 1–11.
- Zissu, B., Klein, E., Porat, R., Langford, B., and Frumkin, A., 2017. Roman Cult, Jewish rebels, share Jerusalem cave site. Biblical Archaeology Review 43:30-39.
- Alex, B., Barzilai, O., Hershkovitz, I., Marder, O., Berna, F., Caracuta, V., Abulafia, T., Davis, L., Goder-Goldberger, M., Lavi, R. and Mintz, E., Regev, L., Bar-Yosef Mayer, D.E., Tejero, J-M., Yeshurun, R., Ayalon, A., Bar-Matthews, M., Yasur, G., Frumkin, A., Latimer, B., Hans, M.G., Boaretto, E., 2017. Radiocarbon chronology of Manot Cave, Israel and Upper Paleolithic dispersals. Science Advances, 2017; Vol. 3, no. 11, e1701450 DOI: 10.1126/sciadv.1701450.
- Fet, V., Soleglad, M.E., Zonstein, S.L., Naaman, I., Lubaton, S., Langford, B. and Frumkin, A., 2017. The Second Record of a Relict Akrav israchanani Levy, 2007 (Scorpiones: Akravidae) from Levana Cave, Israel. Euscorpius, 2017(247), pp. 1–12.
- Davidovich U., Ullman M., Langford B., Frumkin A., Langgut D., Yahalom-Mack N., Abramov J., Marom N., 2018. Distancing the Dead: complex cave burials in the Northern Negev Desert (Israel) during the Late Chalcolithic period. BASOR 379 (2018): 113–52. www.jstor.org/stable/10.5615/bullamerschoorie.379.0113
- Guy-Haim, T., Simon-Blecher, N., Frumkin, A., Naaman, I. and Achituv, Y., 2018. Multiple transgressions and slow evolution shape the phylogeographic pattern of the blind cave-dwelling shrimp Typhlocaris. PeerJ, 6, p.e5268. doi 10.7717/peerj.5268.
- Keinan, J. Bar-Matthews, M. Ayalon, A. Zilberman, T. Agnon, A. Frumkin, A. 2019. Paleoclimatology of the Levant from Zalmon Cave speleothems, the northern Jordan Valley, Israel. Quaternary Science Reviews 220, 142-153
- Zucker E., Frumkin A., Agnon A., Weinberger R. In press. Internal deformation and uplift-rate of Salt walls detected by a displaced dissolution surface, Dead Sea basin. Journal of Structural Geology.
- Hershkovitz, I., Weber, G.W., Quam, R., Duval, M., Grün, R., Kinsley, L., Ayalon, A., Bar-Matthews, M., Valladas, H., Mercier, N., Arsuaga, J.L., Martinón-Torres, M., de Castro, J.M.B., Fornai, C., Martín-Francés, L., Sarig, R., May, H., Krenn, V.A., Slon, V., Rodríguez, L., García, R., Lorenzo, C., Carretero, J.M., Frumkin, A., Shahack-Gross, R., Bar-Yosef Mayer, D.E., Cui, Y., Wu, X., Peled, N., Groman-Yaroslavski, I., Weissbrod, L., Yeshurun, R., Tsatskin, A., Zaidner, Y., Weinstein-Evron, M., 2018. The earliest modern humans outside Africa. Science, 359(6374), pp. 456–459. DOI: 10.1126/science.aap8369

== See also ==
- Malcham cave - The longest salt cave in the world
