= Sharo-Argun =

Sharo-Argun Шара-Орга
- Selo
- Location within Chechnya Location within Russia
- Coordinates: 42°48′44″N 45°49′05″E
- Country: Russia
- Region: Chechnya
- District: Shatoysky District

Population (2010)
  - Total: 303
- Time zone: UTC+3:00

Sharo-Argun (Russian: Шаро-Аргун; Chechen: Шара-Орга, Şara-Orga) is a rural locality (a selo) in the Shatoysky District in Chechnya, Russia. Population: 303 (2010 census); 243 (2002 census);
