= Maricaulaceae =

Scientific classification
- Domain: Bacteria
- Kingdom: Pseudomonadati
- Phylum: Pseudomonadota
- Class: Alphaproteobacteria
- Order: Caulobacterales
- Family: Maricaulaceae; Kevbrin et al. 2021

Genera
- Alkalicaulis Kevbrin et al. 2021; "Euryhalocaulis" Deng et al. 2013; Glycocaulis Abraham et al. 2013; Hyphobacterium Sun et al. 2017; Maricaulis Abraham et al. 1999; Marinicauda Zhang et al. 2013; Oceanicaulis Strömpl et al. 2003; Woodsholea Abraham et al. 2004

Family of bacteria

Maricaulaceae are a family of bacteria in the order Caulobacterales.
