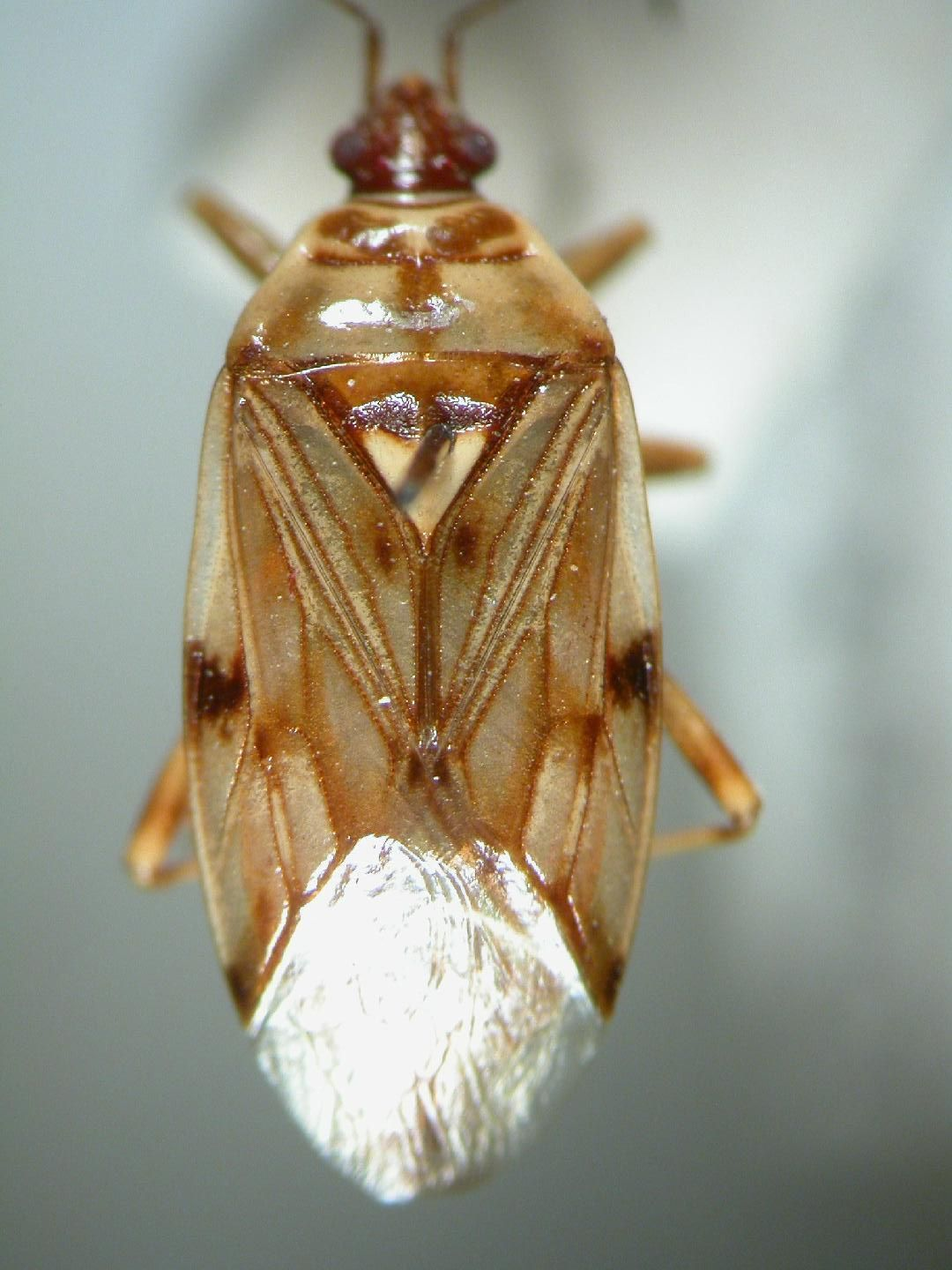
- Trisecus pictus

Scientific classification
- Kingdom: Animalia
- Phylum: Arthropoda
- Clade: Pancrustacea
- Class: Insecta
- Order: Hemiptera
- Suborder: Heteroptera
- Infraorder: Pentatomomorpha
- Superfamily: Idiostoloidea
- Family: Idiostolidae; Scudder, 1962

Genera
- Idiostolus Berg, 1883; Monteithocoris Woodward, 1968; Trisecus Bergroth, 1895

= Idiostolidae =

Family of true bugs

Idiostolidae is a family of true bugs distributed within the southern hemisphere which was formerly placed in the superfamily Lygaeoidea but in 1964 it was placed in the superfamily Idiostoloidea and later included within it as a sister family of the Henicocoridae. It was described in 1962.

- - Aradoidea
  - - Pentatomoidea
    - - Idiostoloidea
        - Idiostolidae
        - Henicocoridae
      - - Coreoidea
        - - Pyrrhocoroidea
          - Lygaeoidea

Relationships within the Pentatomorpha

The Idiostolidae are distributed in southeast Australia, Chile, and Argentina. They have an elongate ovoid body outline and the head is lygaeoid-like and with ocelli. The antennae and labium have 4 segments. The abdominal spiracles are on the underside. The membrane has four longitudinal veins. The hindwing has a hamus (the proximal part of cubital vein has a spur-like side vein that merges into the medial fold). Idiostolus is found in South America. The genera Trisecus and Monteithocoris occur in Australia. They are associated with Nothofagus vegetation. Their relationships to the Lygaeidae was suggested based on morphology and their position within the Pentatomorpha was based on the absence of gonoplacs and the presence of abdominal trichobothria. A molecular phylogenetic based on mitochondrial genes resolved the position of the family within the infraorder pentatomorpha. The separation of the Idiostolidae from the Henicoridae is estimated to have happened around 76 mya in the Late Cretaceous and likely associated with the angiosperm radiation.
