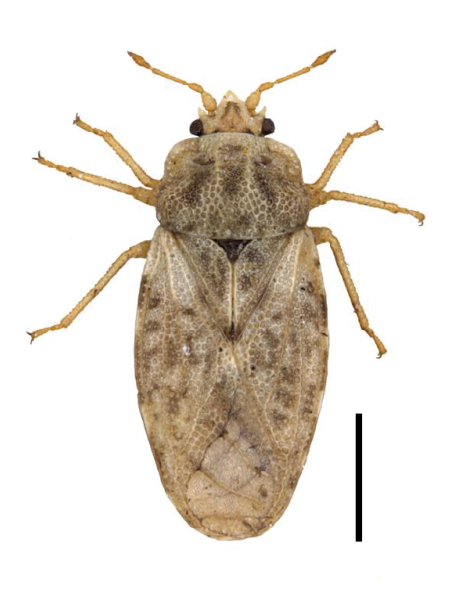

Scientific classification
- Kingdom: Animalia
- Phylum: Arthropoda
- Class: Insecta
- Order: Hemiptera
- Suborder: Heteroptera
- Superfamily: Lygaeoidea
- Family: Piesmatidae
- Subfamily: Piesmatinae
- Genus: Piesma
- Species: P. maculatum

Binomial name
- Piesma maculatum (Laporte, 1833)

= Piesma maculatum =

Species of true bug

Piesma maculatum is a true bug species found from North Africa to southern parts of Scandinavia and the South of the British Isles then across the Palearctic to the Black Sea region to Central Asia, China and Japan. In Central Europe it is widespread and generally the most common species of the family Piesmatidae.

== Ecology ==
Piesma maculatum feeds on (Chenopodiaceae), especially Atriplex and Chenopodium.Macropterous individuals fly considerable distances to suitable overwintering sites where they live in dry ground litter, wood piles, or under loose bark. The animals fly in spring in the search for food plants and are sometimes found in completely atypical habitats, such as raised bogs. The development is just as in Piesma capitatum: mating and egg-laying takes place in April and May, June and adult animals of this generation reproduce again (completely) in the Autumn.
