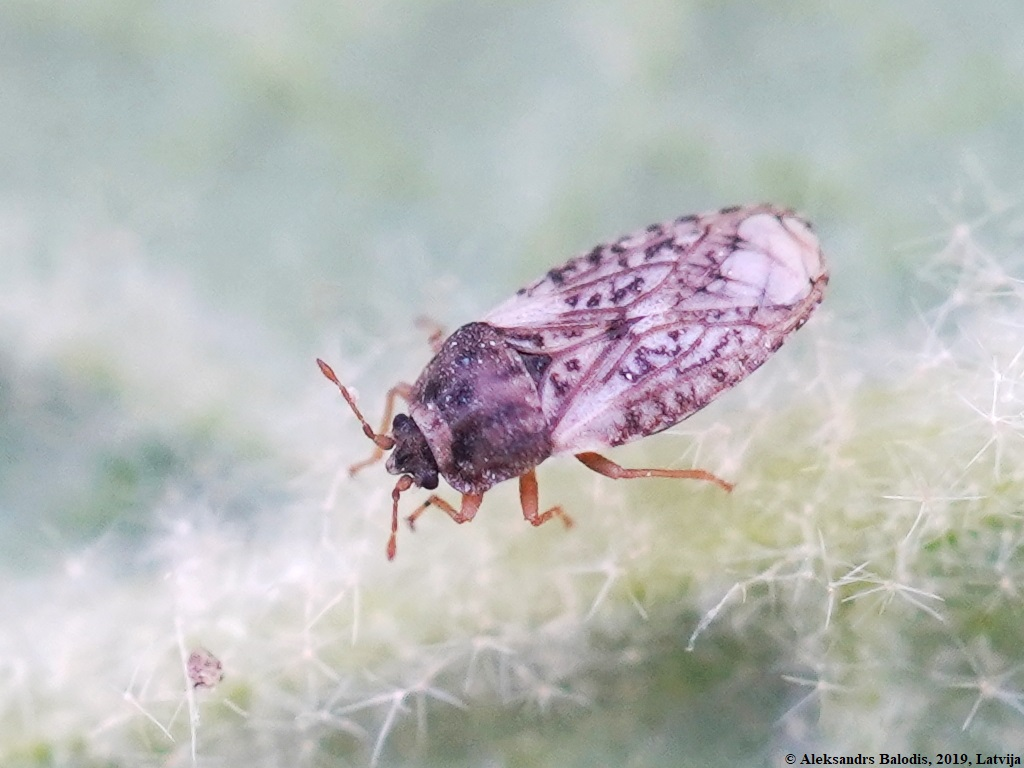
- Piesma maculatum

Scientific classification
- Kingdom: Animalia
- Phylum: Arthropoda
- Class: Insecta
- Order: Hemiptera
- Suborder: Heteroptera
- Family: Piesmatidae
- Subfamily: Piesmatinae
- Genus: Piesma; Lepeletier & Serville, 1825

Type species
- Acanthia capitata Wolff, 1804

Synonyms
- Acanthia Wolff, 1804; Agrammodes Uhler, 1895; Zosmenus Laporte & de Castelnau, 1832

= Piesma =

Genus of true bugs

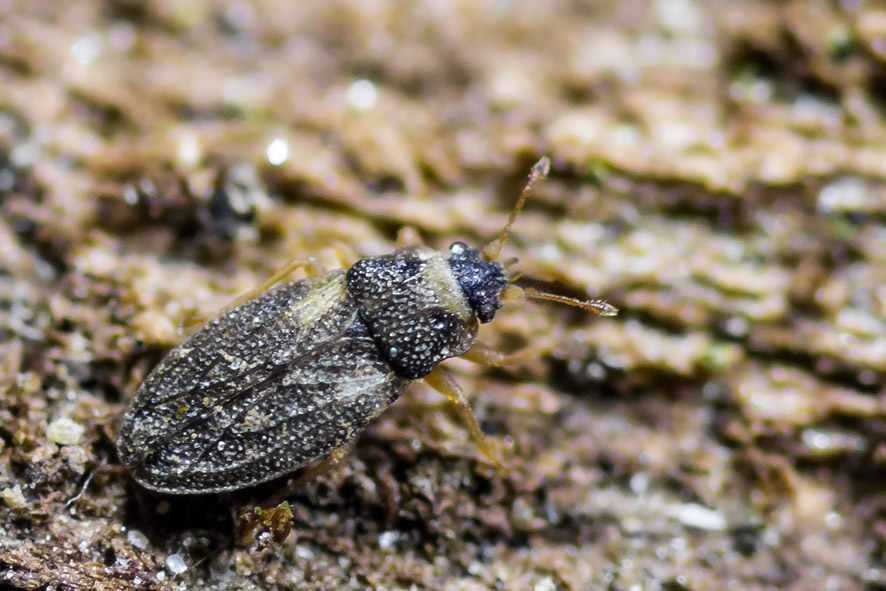
Piesma capitatum

Piesma is a genus of ash-grey leaf bugs, insects of the family Piesmatidae. It is the type genus of the family.

== Description ==
Piesma bugs are less than 4mm long and can be distinguished from the similar genus Parapiesma by the shape of the pronotum: the side margins have a clearly recognizable notch, which the other lacks. These insects are usually macropterous (having fully developed wings), but are sometimes brachypterous.

== Species ==
As of 2021, Lygaeoidea Species File and Fossilworks accept the following species:

1. Piesma brachialis McAtee, 1919 – United States
2. Piesma capitatum (Wolff, 1804) – Asia, Europe
3. Piesma ceramica McAtee, 1919 – United States
4. Piesma costata (Uhler, 1895) – United States
5. Piesma dilutus (Stål, 1855) – Botswana
6. Piesma explanata McAtee, 1919 – United States
7. Piesma linnavuorii – Africa
8. Piesma maculatum (Laporte, 1833) – Europe, Africa
9. Piesma marginepicta – Africa
10. Piesma patruela McAtee, 1919 – United States
11. Piesma protea McAtee, 1919 – United States
12. †Piesma rotunda Scudder 1890 – United States
13. Piesma xishaena Hsiao & Jing, 1979 – China
