= Ceratopachys =

Scientific classification
- Kingdom: Animalia
- Phylum: Arthropoda
- Class: Insecta
- Order: Hemiptera
- Suborder: Heteroptera
- Family: Coreidae
- Subfamily: Coreinae
- Tribe: Homoeocerini
- Genus: Ceratopachys; Westwood, 1842

Synonyms
- Ceratopachis Westwood, 1842

Genus of insects

Ceratopachys is a genus of African seed bugs in the tribe Homoeocerini, erected by John Obadiah Westwood in 1842.

== Species ==
The Coreoidea Species File lists:

- Ceratopachys nigricornis (Germar, 1838)
- Ceratopachys virescens Dallas, 1852
