= Cymoninus notabilis =

Scientific classification
- Domain: Eukaryota
- Kingdom: Animalia
- Phylum: Arthropoda
- Class: Insecta
- Order: Hemiptera
- Suborder: Heteroptera
- Family: Ninidae
- Genus: Cymoninus
- Species: C. notabilis

Binomial name
- Cymoninus notabilis (Distant, 1882)

Species of true bug

Cymoninus notabilis is a species of true bug in the family Ninidae. It is found in the Caribbean Sea, Central America, North America, and South America.
