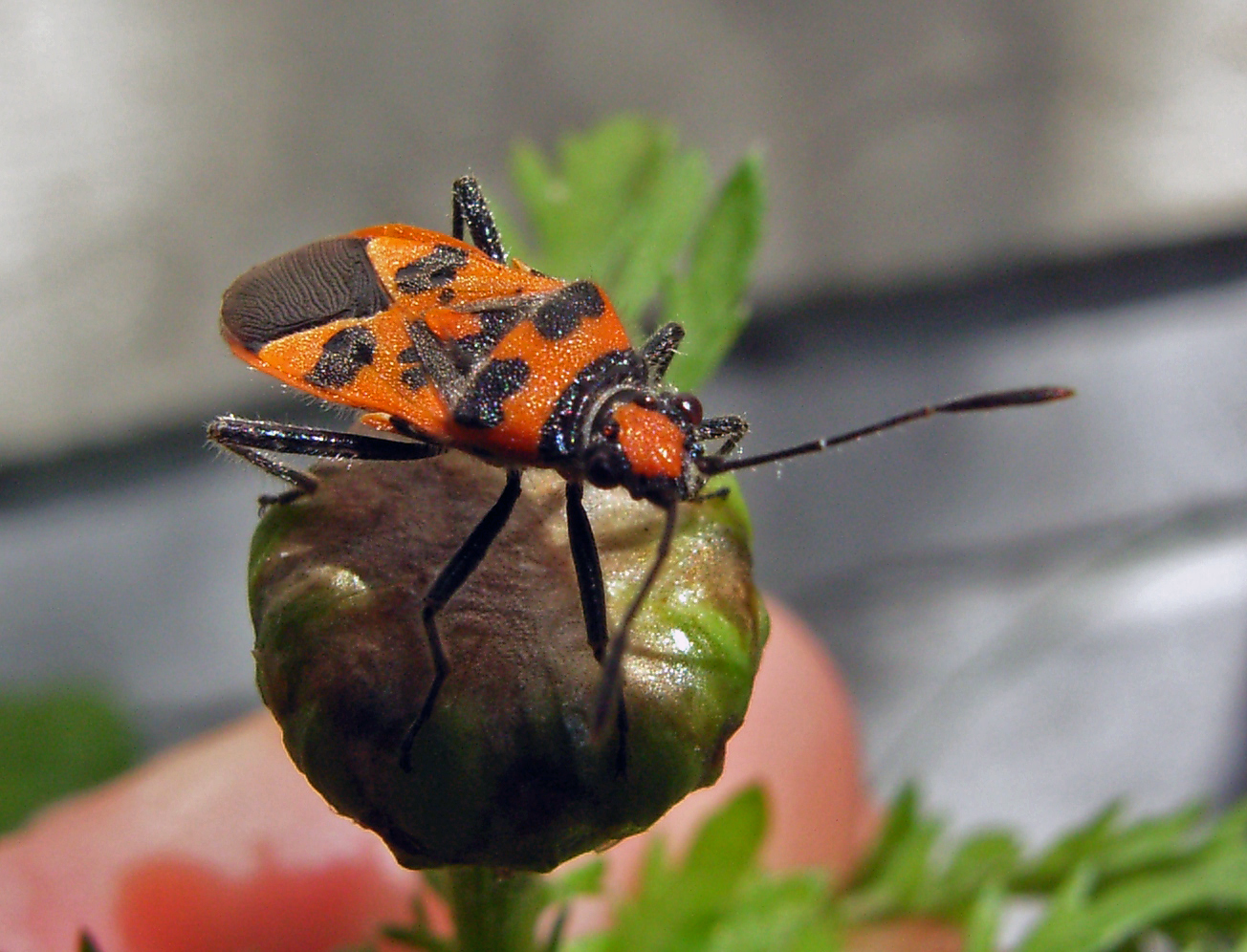
- Corizus hyoscyami of the Rhopalidae

Scientific classification
- Kingdom: Animalia
- Phylum: Arthropoda
- Clade: Pancrustacea
- Class: Insecta
- Order: Hemiptera
- Suborder: Heteroptera
- Infraorder: Pentatomomorpha
- Superfamily: Coreoidea; Reuter 1910

Families
- Five extant, two extinct, see text

= Coreoidea =

Coreoidea Temporal range: Late Triassic–Recent

Superfamily of true bugs

Coreoidea is a superfamily of true bugs in the infraorder Pentatomomorpha which includes leaf-footed bugs and allies. There are more than 3,300 described species in Coreoidea.

There are five extant families presently recognized, but the Coreoidea as a whole are part of a close-knit group with the Lygaeoidea and Pyrrhocoroidea and it is likely that these three superfamilies are paraphyletic to a significant extent; they are therefore in need of revision and redelimitation.

== Families ==
- Alydidae Amyot & Serville, 1843 – broad-headed bugs
- Coreidae Leach, 1815 – leaf-footed bugs and squash bugs
- Hyocephalidae Bergroth, 1906
- Rhopalidae – scentless plant bugs
- Stenocephalidae Amyot & Serville, 1843
- † Trisegmentatidae Zhang, Sun & Zhang, 1994
- † Yuripopovinidae Azar, Nel, Engel, Garrouste & Matocq, 2011
- † Pachymeridiidae Handlirsch, 1906
