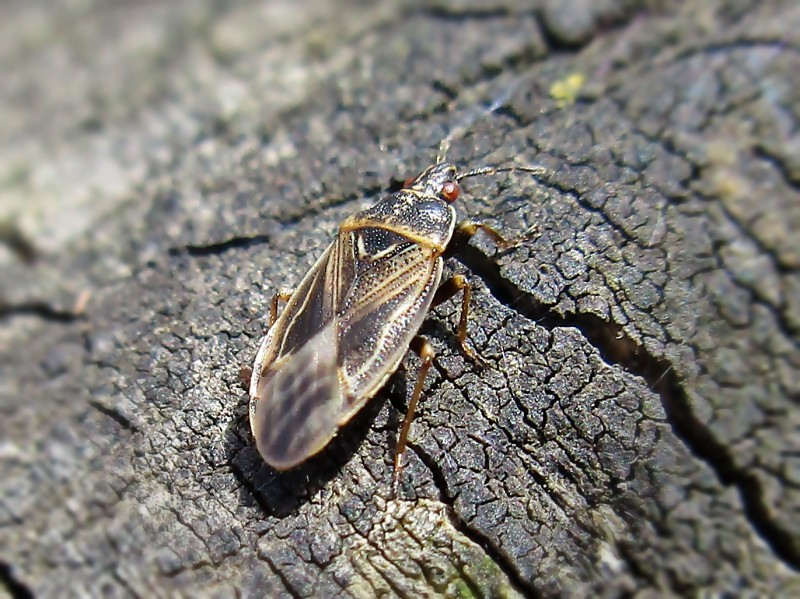

Scientific classification
- Domain: Eukaryota
- Kingdom: Animalia
- Phylum: Arthropoda
- Class: Insecta
- Order: Hemiptera
- Suborder: Heteroptera
- Family: Artheneidae
- Genus: Chilacis
- Species: C. typhae

Binomial name
- Chilacis typhae (Perris, 1857)

= Chilacis typhae =

Species of true bug

Chilacis typhae, the bulrush bug, is a species of true bug in the family Artheneidae. It is found in Europe and Northern Asia (excluding China) and North America.

It is typically associated with greater reedmace and Typha angustifolia; adults can be found pairing on the seed heads between spring and autumn. They often overwinter within the seed heads. At times, they can occur at significant concentrations, with over 1000 individuals found in a single seedhead.

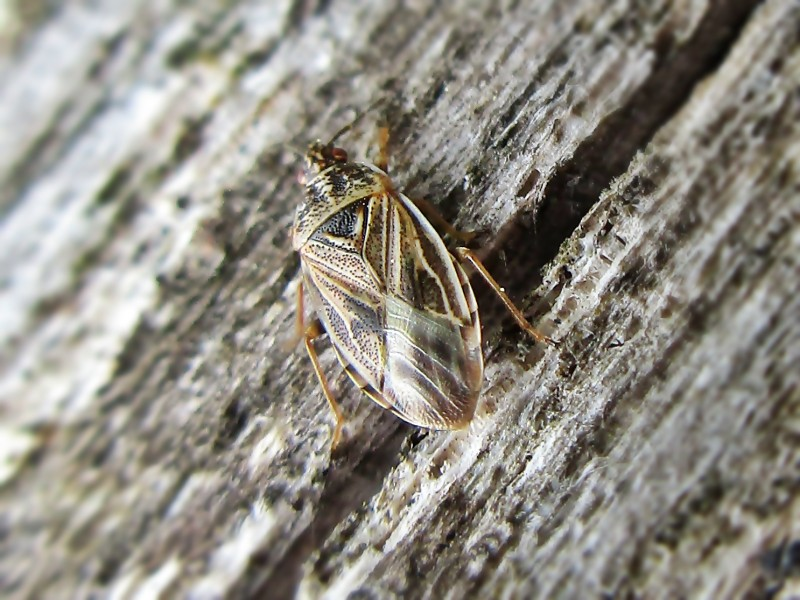
Bulrush bug, Chilacis typhae

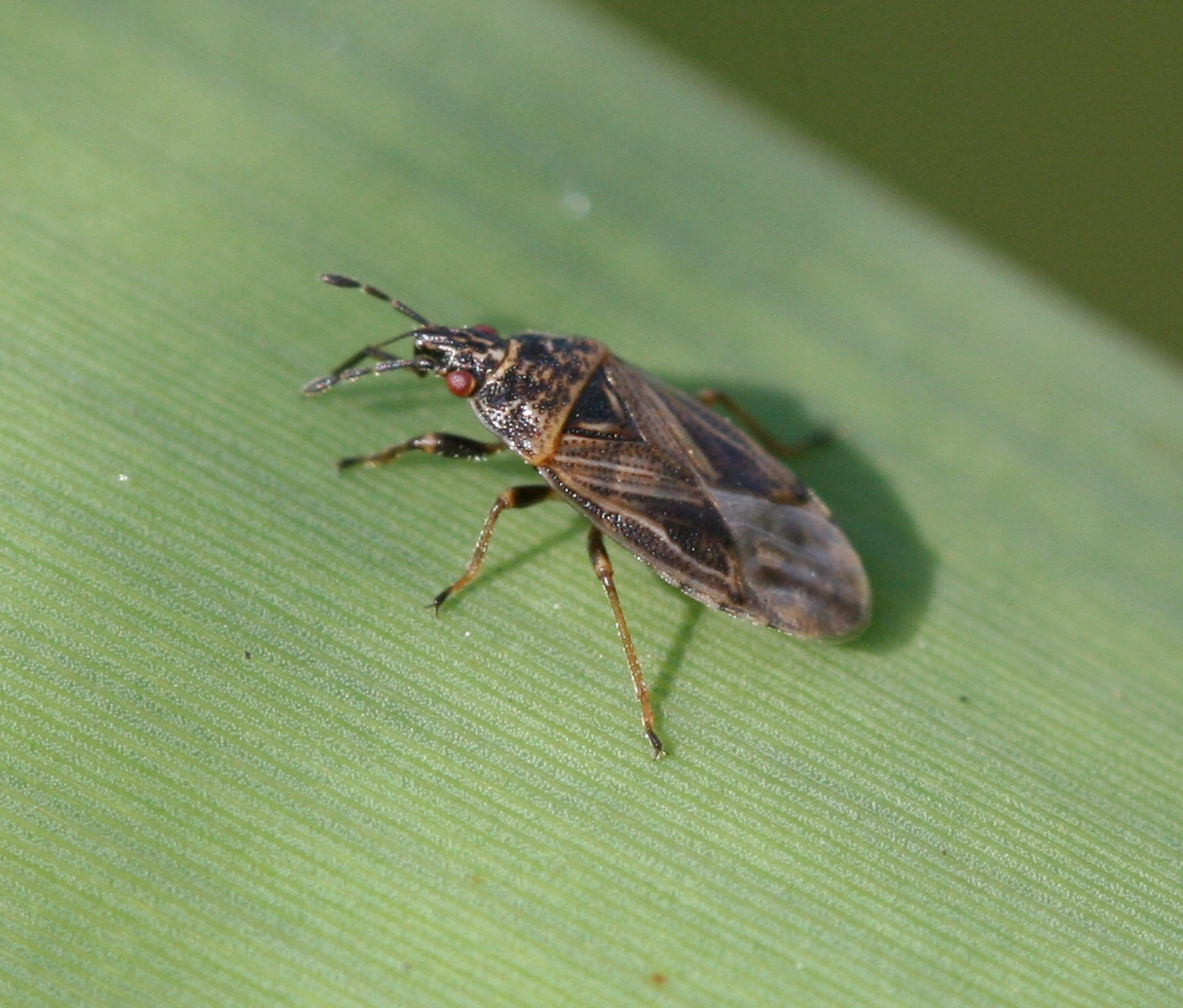
Bulrush bug, Chilacis typhae
