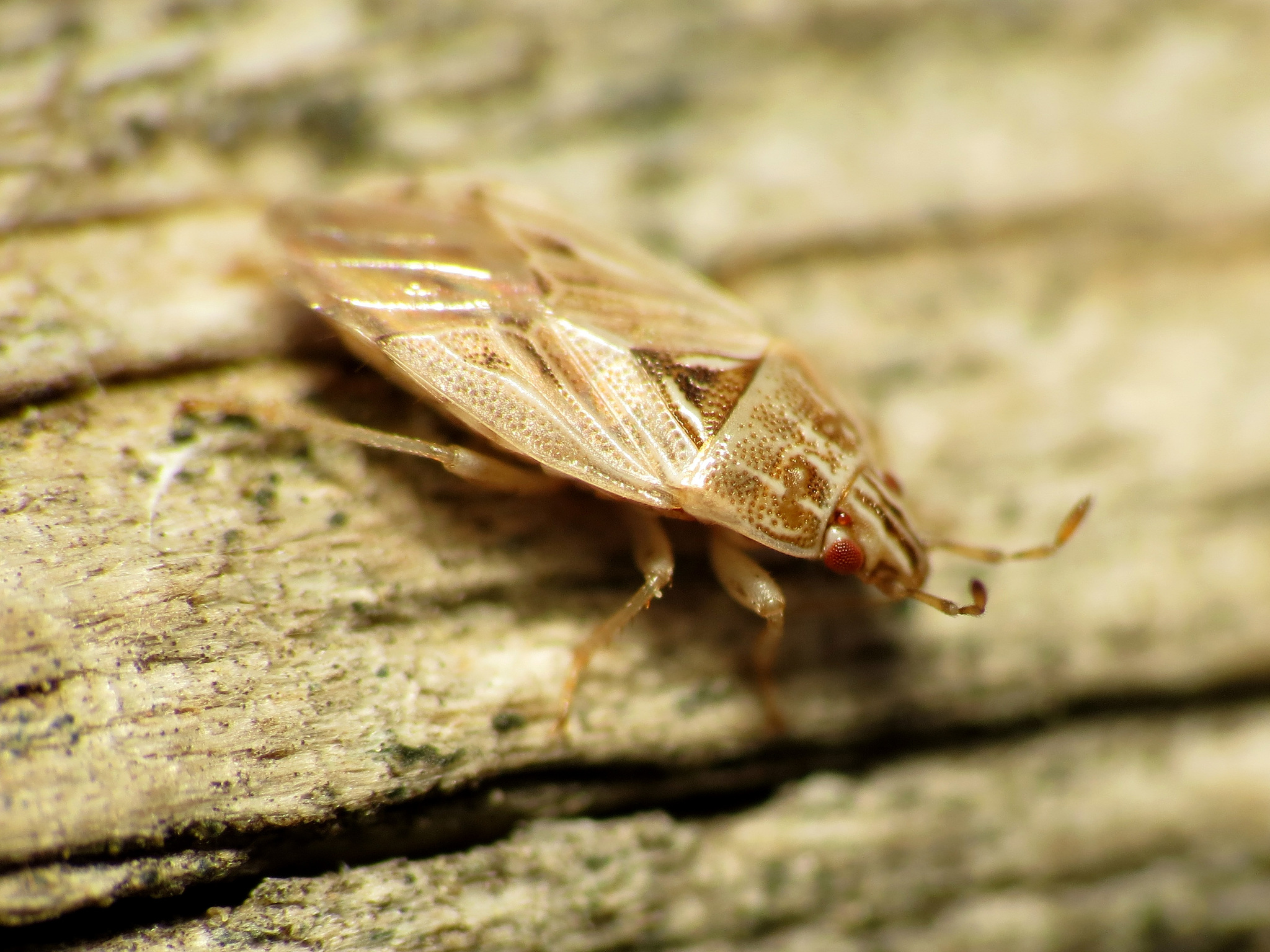
- Heritage Island's Holocranum Saturejae

Scientific classification
- Kingdom: Animalia
- Phylum: Arthropoda
- Clade: Pancrustacea
- Class: Insecta
- Order: Hemiptera
- Suborder: Heteroptera
- Family: Artheneidae
- Genus: Holcocranum
- Species: H. saturejae

Binomial name
- Holcocranum saturejae (Kolenati, 1845)

= Holcocranum saturejae =

Species of true bug

Holcocranum saturejae is a species of true bug in the family Artheneidae. It is native to the Palearctic region, ranging from the Mediterranean basin to western Asia, and has also been found in tropical African countries such as Chad, Ghana, Nigeria and Tanzania, as well as in eastern North America, where it has either spread naturally or as unintentionally introduced species.
