= Cryptorhamphidae =

Scientific classification
- Domain: Eukaryota
- Kingdom: Animalia
- Phylum: Arthropoda
- Class: Insecta
- Order: Hemiptera
- Suborder: Heteroptera
- Infraorder: Pentatomomorpha
- Superfamily: Lygaeoidea
- Family: Cryptorhamphidae; Hamid, 1971

Family of true bugs

Cryptorhamphidae is a family of true bugs in the order Hemiptera. There are at least two genera and four described species in Cryptorhamphidae.

== Genera ==
These two genera belong to the family Cryptorhamphidae:

- Cryptorhamphus Stal, 1859
- Gonystus Stal, 1874
