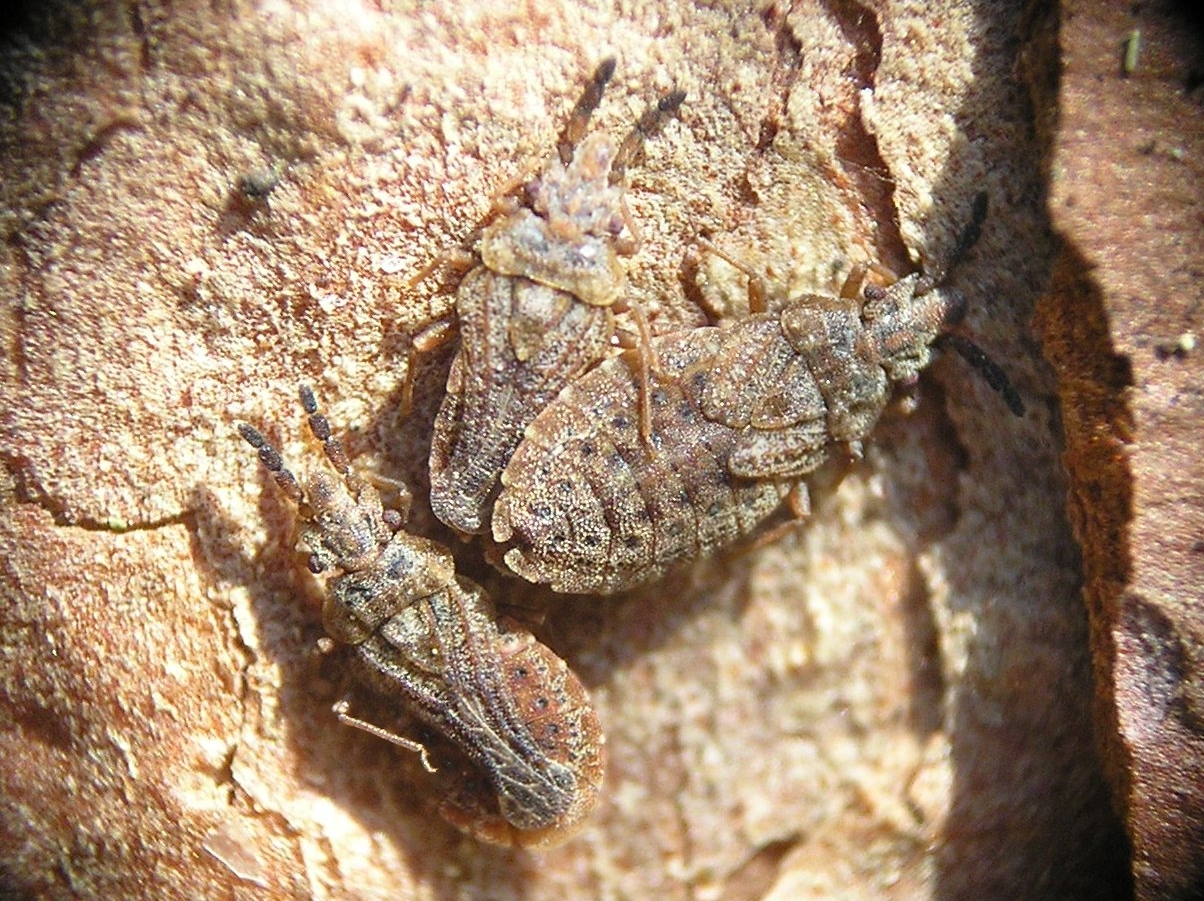
- Mating pair of Aradus cinnamomeus with a second male nearby.

Scientific classification
- Kingdom: Animalia
- Phylum: Arthropoda
- Class: Insecta
- Order: Hemiptera
- Suborder: Heteroptera
- Infraorder: Pentatomomorpha
- Superfamily: Aradoidea

Families
- Aradidae; Termitaphididae; and see text

= Aradoidea =

Aradoidea Temporal range: Aptian–Recent

Superfamily of true bugs

Aradoidea is a superfamily of true bugs. The Piesmatidae, usually placed in the Lygaeoidea, might also belong here.
