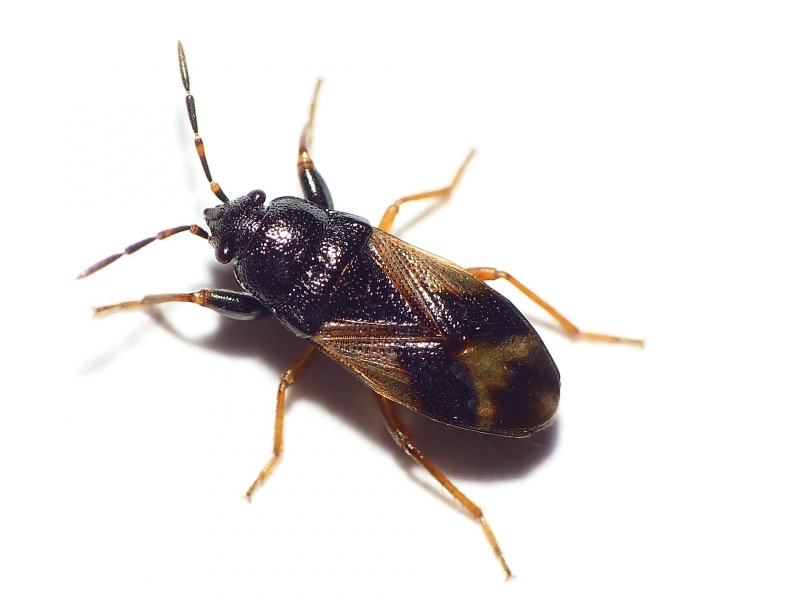
- Megalonotus praetextatus

Scientific classification
- Kingdom: Animalia
- Phylum: Arthropoda
- Class: Insecta
- Order: Hemiptera
- Suborder: Heteroptera
- Family: Rhyparochromidae
- Tribe: Megalonotini
- Genus: Megalonotus; Fieber, 1860

= Megalonotus =

Genus of true bugs

Megalonotus is a genus of seed bugs in the family Rhyparochromidae.

Species are mostly found in the Palaearctic and Nearctic realms; Megalonotus antennatus, M. chiragra (the type species), M. dilatatus, M. emarginatus, M. praetextatus and M. sabulicola are recorded from the British Isles.

== Species ==
The following species (27 in 2025) belong to the genus Megalonotus:

- Megalonotus antennatus (Schilling, 1829)^{c g}
- Megalonotus brevicornis (Puton, A., 1883)^{c g}
- Megalonotus chiragra (Fabricius, 1794) - type species (as Lygaeus chiragra Fabricius, 1794)
- Megalonotus colon Puton, A., 1874^{c g}
- Megalonotus dilatatus (Herrich-Schaeffer, 1840)^{c g}
- Megalonotus dilitatus (Herrich-Schaeffer, 1840)^{g}
- Megalonotus emarginatus (Rey, C., 1888)^{c g}
- Megalonotus hirsutus Fieber, F.X., 1861^{c g}
- Megalonotus lederi (Horvath, G., 1880)^{c g}
- Megalonotus longipilus (Puton, A., 1884)^{c g}
- Megalonotus maximus (Puton, A. & Noualhier, 1895)^{c g}
- Megalonotus merus Seidendstucker, 1979^{c g}
- Megalonotus mixtus (Horvath, G., 1887)^{c g}
- Megalonotus nitidicollis Puton, A., 1874^{c g}
- Megalonotus opaconotum (Lindberg, H., 1953)^{c g}
- Megalonotus parallelus (Horvath, G., 1911)^{c g}
- Megalonotus praetextatus (Herrich-Schaeffer, G.H.W., 1850)^{c g}
- Megalonotus puncticollis (Lucas, 1849)^{c g}
- Megalonotus rugulosus (Linnavuori, R., 1953)^{c g}
- Megalonotus sabulicola (Thomson, 1870)^{i b}
- Megalonotus sabulicolus (Thomson, 1870)^{c g}
- Megalonotus scaurus Seidenstucker, 1973^{c g}
- Megalonotus semela Linnavuori, 1970^{c g}
- Megalonotus setosus Puton, A., 1874^{c g}
- Megalonotus sophenus Seidenstucker, 1973^{c g}
- Megalonotus subtilissimus Roubal, 1961^{g}
- Megalonotus tricolor (Horvath, G., 1895)^{c g}

Data sources: i = ITIS, c = Catalogue of Life, g = GBIF, b = Bugguide.net
