= Mcateella =

Scientific classification
- Kingdom: Animalia
- Phylum: Arthropoda
- Clade: Pancrustacea
- Class: Insecta
- Order: Hemiptera
- Suborder: Heteroptera
- Family: Piesmatidae
- Subfamily: Piesmatinae
- Genus: Mcateella; Drake, 1924

Type species
- Mcateella splendida Drake, 1924

Genus of true bugs

Mcateella is a genus of ash-grey leaf bugs, insects of the family Piesmatidae, first described by Carl John Drake in 1924 The genus name honours Waldo Lee McAtee. The genus is endemic to Australia and is found in all mainland states and territories, with the exception of Victoria and the ACT.

Elias and Cassis state that Mcateella feed not only on Acacias, but on a wide range of plants..

A phylogenetic analysis found that Miespa is a sister taxon of Mcateella, implying a transantarctic relationship.

== Species ==
As of 2022, the Australian Faunal Directory accepts the following species:

- Mcateella austera Elias & Cassis, 2012
- Mcateella coolgardie Elias & Cassis, 2012
- Mcateella elongata Hacker, 1927
- Mcateella esperancensis Elias & Cassis, 2012
- Mcateella exocarposa Elias & Cassis, 2012
- Mcateella gibber Drake, 1958
- Mcateella interioris Hacker, 1928
- Mcateella kwoki Elias & Cassis, 2012
- Mcateella reidi Elias & Cassis, 2012
- Mcateella schuhi Elias & Cassis, 2012
- Mcateella splendida Drake, 1924
