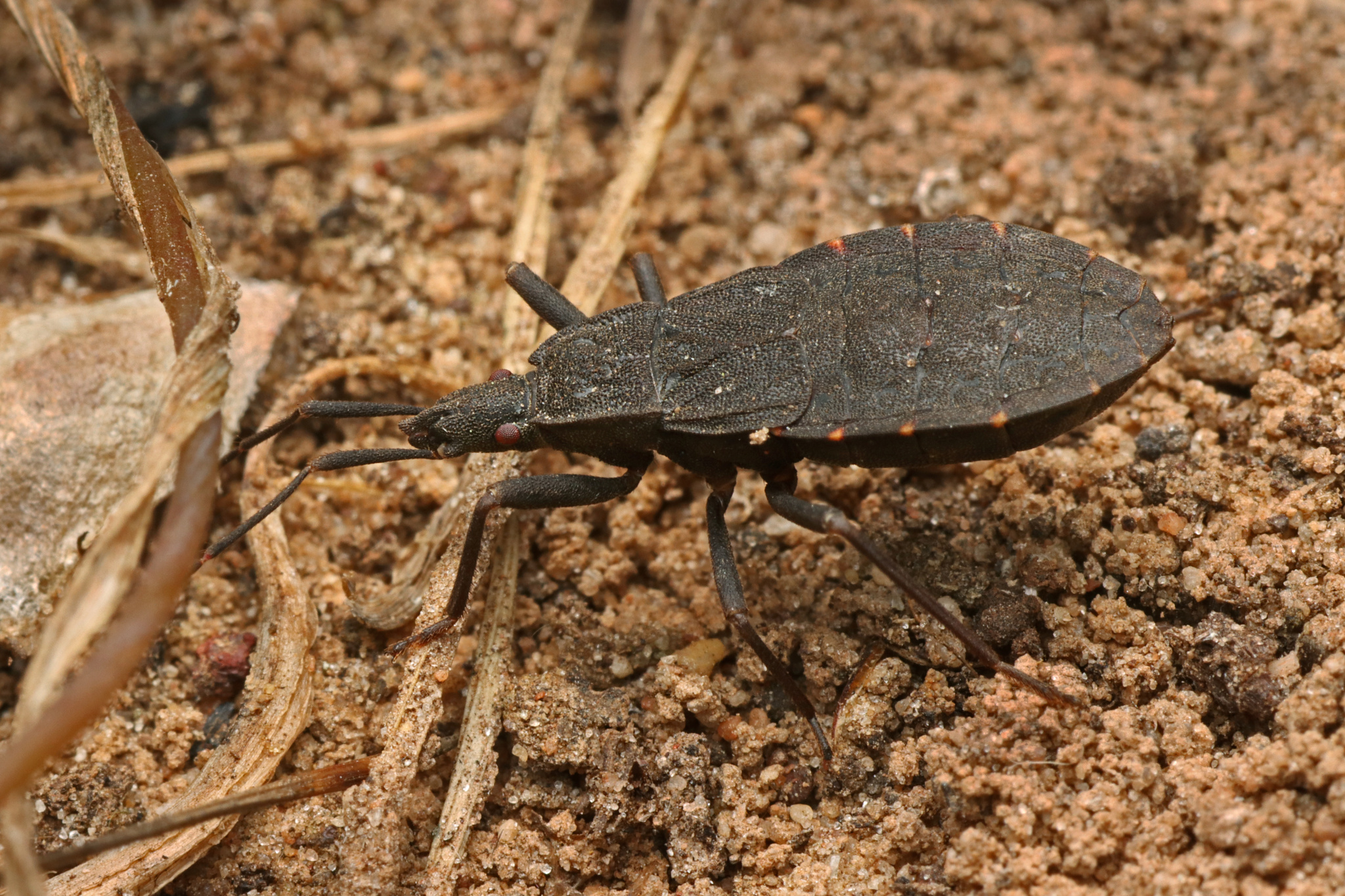
- Hyocephalus aprugnus

Scientific classification
- Kingdom: Animalia
- Phylum: Arthropoda
- Clade: Pancrustacea
- Class: Insecta
- Order: Hemiptera
- Suborder: Heteroptera
- Infraorder: Pentatomomorpha
- Superfamily: Coreoidea
- Family: Hyocephalidae; Bergroth, 1906

= Hyocephalidae =

Family of true bugs

Hyocephalidae are a small family of Heteroptera which are endemic to Australia.

== Genera ==
These two genera make up the family Hyocephalidae.

- Hyocephalus Bergroth, 1906
- Maevius Stål, 1874
