= Fracastorius =

Fracastorius cornutus

Scientific classification
- Domain: Eukaryota
- Kingdom: Animalia
- Phylum: Arthropoda
- Class: Insecta
- Order: Hemiptera
- Suborder: Heteroptera
- Family: Coreidae
- Subfamily: Coreinae
- Tribe: Homoeocerini
- Genus: Fracastorius; Distant, 1901
- Species: F. cornutus

Binomial name
- Fracastorius cornutus Distant, 1902

Genus of Hemiptera

Fracastorius is a genus of Asian seed bugs in the tribe Homoeocerini, erected by William Lucas Distant in 1901. It contains the single species Fracastorius cornutus which was originally recorded from Myanmar.
