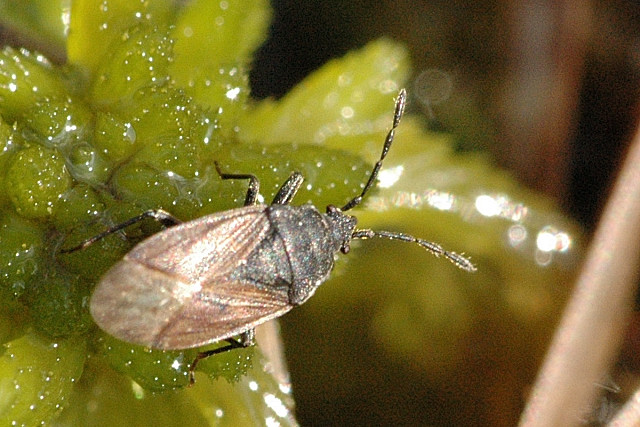
- Drymus brunneus

Scientific classification
- Kingdom: Animalia
- Phylum: Arthropoda
- Class: Insecta
- Order: Hemiptera
- Suborder: Heteroptera
- Family: Rhyparochromidae
- Tribe: Drymini
- Genus: Drymus; Fieber, 1861

= Drymus =

Genus of true bugs

Drymus is a genus of seed bugs in the family Rhyparochromidae and typical of the tribe Drymini. Described species of Drymus are found in Europe, North Africa, North America and Asia.

== Species ==
The Lygaeoidea Species File includes two subgenera:

Drymus Fieber, 1860

1. Drymus bicolor Distant, 1901
2. Drymus chiapensis Brailovsky & Barrera, 2010
3. Drymus crassus Van Duzee, 1910
4. Drymus hidakai Neimorovets, 2007
5. Drymus latus Douglas & Scott, 1871
6. Drymus mexicanus Slater & Brailovsky, 1997
7. Drymus naini (Distant, 1909)
8. Drymus pilicornis (Mulsant & Rey, 1852)
9. Drymus pilipes Fieber, 1861 - type species (by subsequent designation)
10. †Drymus punctatus Statz & Wagner, 1950
11. Drymus scambus Stål, 1872
12. Drymus unus (Say, 1832)

Sylvadrymus Le Quesne, 1956

1. Drymus assimilis Horváth, 1897
2. Drymus brunneus (Sahlberg, 1848)
3. Drymus laeviventris Kerzhner, 1977
4. Drymus marginatus Distant, 1883
5. Drymus orientalis Kerzhner, 1977
6. Drymus parvulus Jakovlev, 1881
7. Drymus pumilio Puton, 1877
8. Drymus ryeii Douglas & Scott, 1865
9. Drymus sylvaticus (Fabricius, 1775)
