= Meschiidae =

Scientific classification
- Kingdom: Animalia
- Phylum: Arthropoda
- Clade: Pancrustacea
- Class: Insecta
- Order: Hemiptera
- Suborder: Heteroptera
- Infraorder: Pentatomomorpha
- Superfamily: Lygaeoidea
- Family: Meschiidae; Malipatil, 2014

Family of true bugs

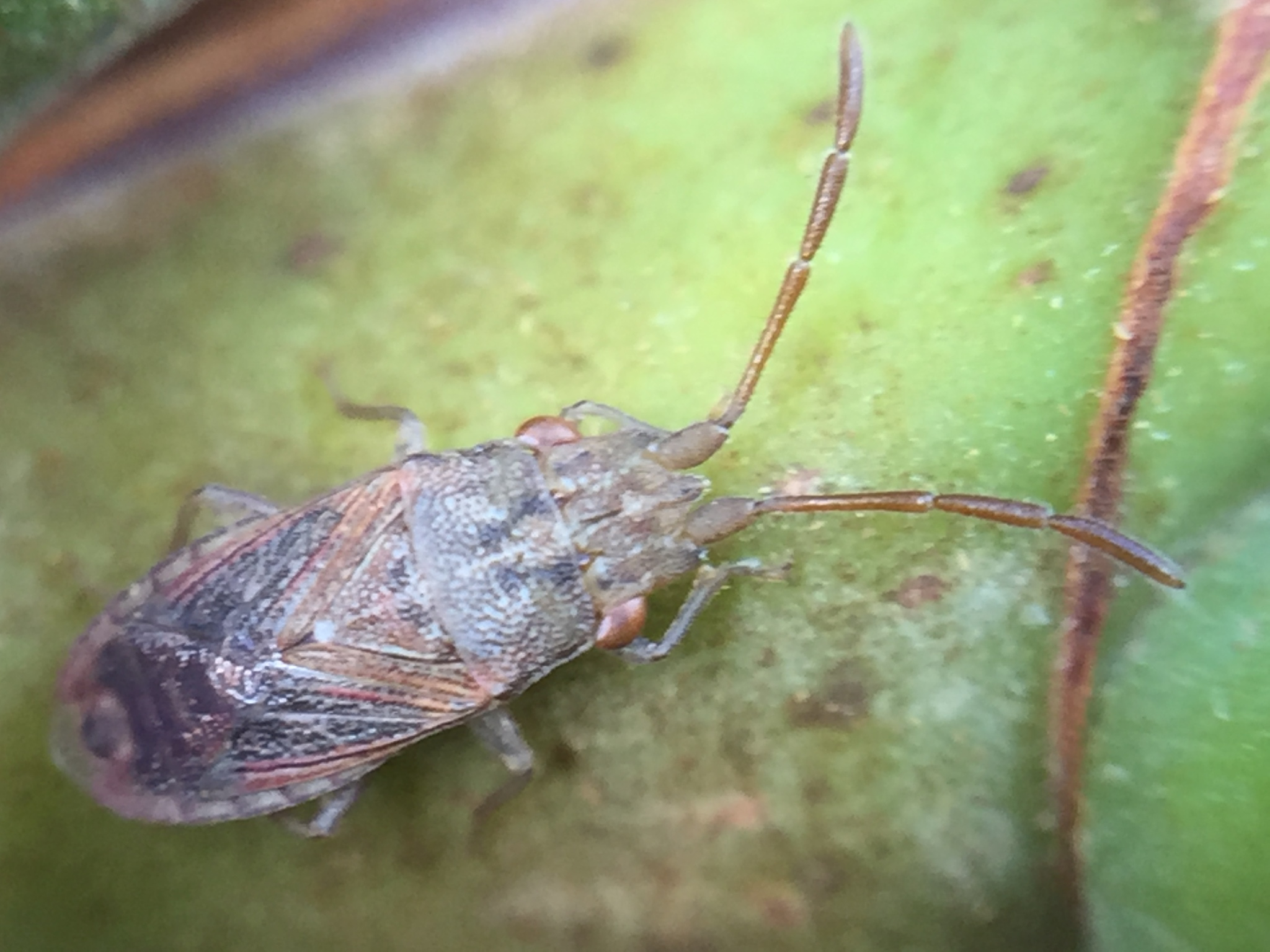
Meschia barrowensis (Heteroptera, Meschiidae), observed by Stephen Thorpe on April 8, 2022 at Auckland University Central Campus & Albert Park, Auckland, New Zealand.

Meschiidae is a family of true bugs in the order Hemiptera. It comprises at least three genera and about five described species within the family.

== Genera ==
These two genera belong to the family Meschiidae:

- Heissothignus Slater & Brailovsky, 2006
- Meschia Distant, 1910
- Neomeschia Malipatil, 2014
