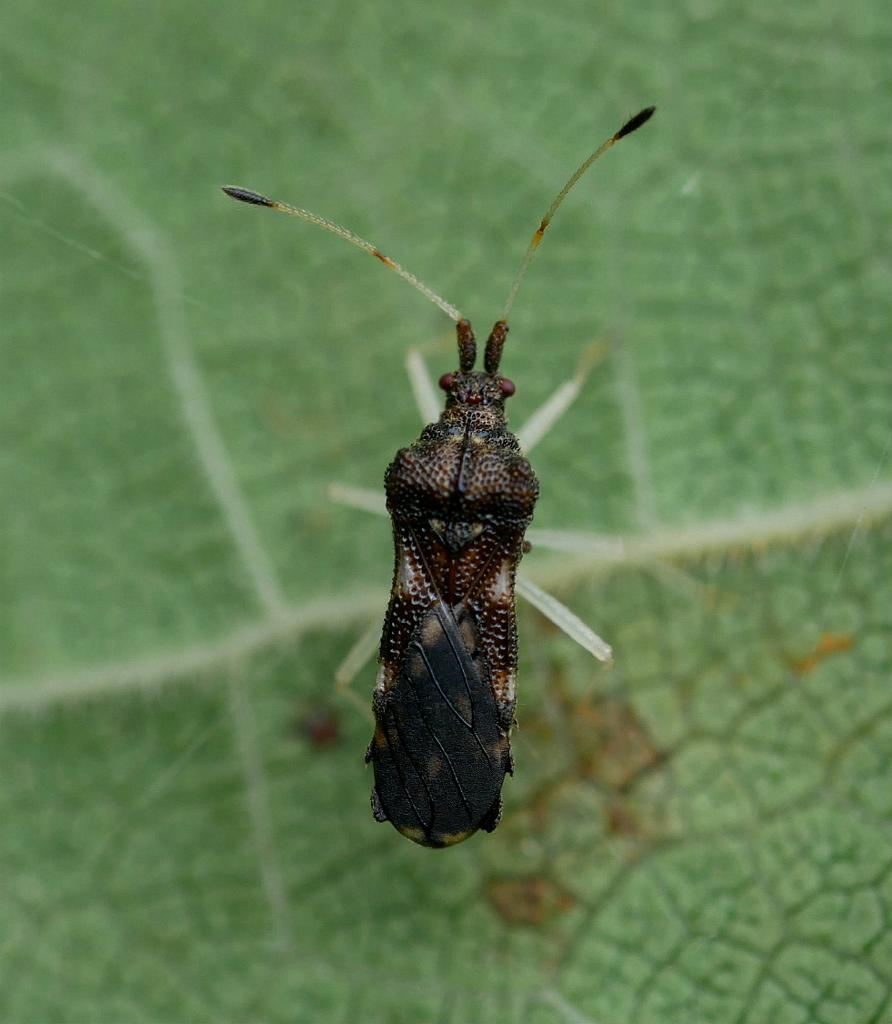

Scientific classification
- Kingdom: Animalia
- Phylum: Arthropoda
- Clade: Pancrustacea
- Class: Insecta
- Order: Hemiptera
- Suborder: Heteroptera
- Infraorder: Pentatomomorpha
- Superfamily: Lygaeoidea
- Family: Malcidae; Stål, 1865

= Malcidae =

Family of true bugs

Malcidae is a family of true bugs in the order Hemiptera. There are at least 4 genera and more than 40 described species in Malcidae.

== Genera ==
These four genera belong to the family Malcidae:

- Chauliops Scott, 1874
- Malcus Stal, 1859
- Neochauliops Stys, 1963
- † Eochauliops Camier, Logghe, Nel & Garrouste, 2019
