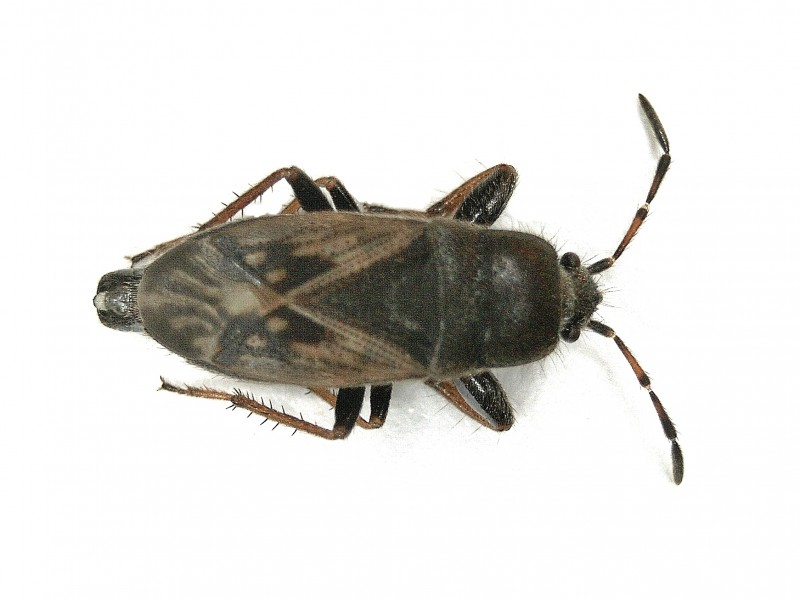

Scientific classification
- Domain: Eukaryota
- Kingdom: Animalia
- Phylum: Arthropoda
- Class: Insecta
- Order: Hemiptera
- Suborder: Heteroptera
- Family: Rhyparochromidae
- Genus: Megalonotus
- Species: M. sabulicola

Binomial name
- Megalonotus sabulicola (Thomson, 1870)

= Megalonotus sabulicola =

Species of true bug

Megalonotus sabulicola is a species of dirt-colored seed bug in the family Rhyparochromidae. It is found in Europe and Northern Asia (excluding China) and North America.
