= List of Homoeocerus species =

These 125 species belong to the genus Homoeocerus, leaf-footed bug.

== Homoeocerus species ==
- Homoeocerus abbreviatus (Fabricius, 1794)
- Homoeocerus abdominalis Distant, 1901
- Homoeocerus adustus Blöte, 1936
- Homoeocerus albiguttulus Stål, 1873
- Homoeocerus albiventris Dallas, 1852
- Homoeocerus angulatus Westwood, 1842
- Homoeocerus annulatus (Thunberg, 1822)
- Homoeocerus atkinsoni Distant, 1901
- Homoeocerus badgleyi Distant, 1908
- Homoeocerus bannaensis Hsiao, 1962
- Homoeocerus bequaerti Schouteden, 1913
- Homoeocerus bicolor Germar, 1838
- Homoeocerus bicoloripes Li, 1981
- Homoeocerus biguttatus Westwood, 1842
- Homoeocerus bipunctatus Hsiao, 1962
- Homoeocerus bipustulatus Stål, 1871
- Homoeocerus borneensis Distant, 1901
- Homoeocerus bredoi Schouteden, 1938
- Homoeocerus breviplicatus Bergroth, 1921
- Homoeocerus cingalensis (Stål, 1860)
- Homoeocerus cleio Linnavuori, 1974
- Homoeocerus cletoformis Hsiao, 1963
- Homoeocerus concisus Walker, 1871
- Homoeocerus concoloratus (Uhler, 1860)
- Homoeocerus dallasi Blöte, 1936
- Homoeocerus dan Villiers, 1950
- Homoeocerus delagoae Distant, 1902
- Homoeocerus dilatatus Horváth, 1879
- Homoeocerus discretus Bergroth, 1893
- Homoeocerus fasciatus Stål, 1871
- Homoeocerus fascifer (Stål, 1860)
- Homoeocerus fasciolatus Stål, 1873
- Homoeocerus fraternus Distant, 1908
- Homoeocerus freynei Schouteden, 1938
- Homoeocerus fuscicornis Horváth, 1893
- Homoeocerus glossatus Ahmad & Perveen, 1994
- Homoeocerus graminis (Fabricius, 1803)
- Homoeocerus gutta Dallas, 1852
- Homoeocerus herbaceus Bergroth, 1921
- Homoeocerus hulstaerti Schouteden, 1938
- Homoeocerus humeralis Hsiao, 1962
- Homoeocerus ignotus Schouteden, 1938
- Homoeocerus immaculatus Stål, 1871
- Homoeocerus immaculipennis Stål, 1873
- Homoeocerus impictus Hsiao, 1962
- Homoeocerus indus Distant, 1918
- Homoeocerus insignis Hsiao, 1963
- Homoeocerus insubidus Germar, 1838
- Homoeocerus javanicus Dallas, 1852
- Homoeocerus karschi Haglund, 1895
- Homoeocerus katangensis Schouteden, 1938
- Homoeocerus lacertosus Distant, 1889
- Homoeocerus laevilineus Stål, 1873
- Homoeocerus laterinotatus Blöte, 1936
- Homoeocerus limbatipennis (Stål, 1860)
- Homoeocerus limbatus Hsiao, 1963
- Homoeocerus lineaticollis Stål, 1873
- Homoeocerus lineaticornis Haglund, 1895
- Homoeocerus lineatus Walker, 1871
- Homoeocerus lucidus Walker, 1871
- Homoeocerus ludovicus Schouteden, 1938
- Homoeocerus luluensis Schouteden, 1938
- Homoeocerus macula Dallas, 1852
- Homoeocerus malayensis Distant, 1901
- Homoeocerus marginatus (Ahmad & Perveen, 1983)
- Homoeocerus marginellus (Herrich-Schäffer, 1840)
- Homoeocerus marginepunctatus Blöte, 1936
- Homoeocerus marginiventris Dohrn, 1860
- Homoeocerus maynei Schouteden, 1938
- Homoeocerus meniscus Hsiao, 1962
- Homoeocerus montanus Distant, 1901
- Homoeocerus nigridorsum Horváth, 1889
- Homoeocerus nota Blöte, 1936
- Homoeocerus ochraceus Blöte, 1936
- Homoeocerus ornaticollis Breddin, 1912
- Homoeocerus ornativentris Breddin, 1900
- Homoeocerus overlaeti Schouteden, 1938
- Homoeocerus pallens (Fabricius, 1781)
- Homoeocerus pallescens Blöte, 1936
- Homoeocerus pallidulus Blöte, 1936
- Homoeocerus pallidus Hesse, 1935
- Homoeocerus perpolitus Distant, 1902
- Homoeocerus perpunctatus Distant, 1902
- Homoeocerus picturatus Schouteden, 1938
- Homoeocerus plebejus (Stål, 1860)
- Homoeocerus ponsi Schouteden, 1913
- Homoeocerus prasinus (Germar, 1838)
- Homoeocerus puncticornis (Burmeister, 1834)
- Homoeocerus punctum Dallas, 1852
- Homoeocerus pupillatus Bergroth, 1921
- Homoeocerus relatus Distant, 1908
- Homoeocerus rubefactus Distant, 1902
- Homoeocerus rubromaculatus (Hsiao, 1963)
- Homoeocerus rufulus Blöte, 1936
- Homoeocerus schoutedeni Villiers, 1950
- Homoeocerus scutellatus Distant, 1902
- Homoeocerus serrifer (Westwood, 1842)
- Homoeocerus shokaensis Matsumura, 1913
- Homoeocerus simiolus Distant, 1902
- Homoeocerus simplex Walker, 1871
- Homoeocerus sinicus Walker, 1871
- Homoeocerus sticheli Bergroth, 1924
- Homoeocerus striicornis Scott, 1874
- Homoeocerus subjectus Walker, 1871
- Homoeocerus sumbawensis Blöte, 1936
- Homoeocerus tangens Blöte, 1936
- Homoeocerus taprobanensis Distant, 1902
- Homoeocerus tenuicornis Stål, 1873
- Homoeocerus tigrinus Hesse, 1925
- Homoeocerus tinctus Distant, 1883
- Homoeocerus trabeatus Hesse, 1925
- Homoeocerus uelensis Schouteden, 1938
- Homoeocerus unicolor Li, 1981
- Homoeocerus unipunctatus (Thunberg, 1783)
- Homoeocerus urbanus Stål, 1873
- Homoeocerus varicolor Xiong, 1987
- Homoeocerus ventriosus Hesse, 1925
- Homoeocerus vicarians Karsch, 1892
- Homoeocerus virescens Villiers, 1973
- Homoeocerus viridis Hsiao, 1962
- Homoeocerus viridulus Ren, 1993
- Homoeocerus walkeri Kirby, 1892
- Homoeocerus walkerianus Lethierry & Severin, 1894
- Homoeocerus wealei Distant, 1893
- Homoeocerus yunnanensis Hsiao, 1962
