= Holcocranum =

Scientific classification
- Kingdom: Animalia
- Phylum: Arthropoda
- Class: Insecta
- Order: Hemiptera
- Suborder: Heteroptera
- Family: Artheneidae
- Subfamily: Artheneinae
- Genus: Holcocranum; Fieber, 1860

Genus of true bugs

Holcocranum is a genus of true bugs in the family Artheneidae. There are at least two described species in Holcocranum.

== Species ==
These two species belong to the genus Holcocranum:

- Holcocranum diminutum Horvath, 1898
- Holcocranum saturejae (Kolenati, 1845)
