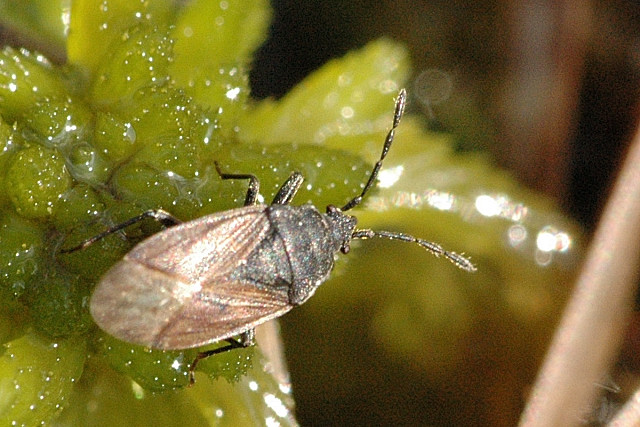
- Drymus brunneus

Scientific classification
- Kingdom: Animalia
- Phylum: Arthropoda
- Clade: Pancrustacea
- Class: Insecta
- Order: Hemiptera
- Suborder: Heteroptera
- Family: Rhyparochromidae
- Subfamily: Rhyparochrominae
- Tribe: Drymini
- Genus: Drymus
- Species: D. brunneus

Binomial name
- Drymus brunneus (R. F Sahlberg, 1848)

= Drymus brunneus =

Species of true bug

Drymus brunneus is a species of dirt-colored seed bug in the family Rhyparochromidae found in the Palearctic. In the West Palearctic it is lacking only in the far north of Northern and Eastern Europe. In the East, the species ranges to the Caucasus and Siberia.

In the Alps it is found up to 1300 meters above sea level. Habitats include shady deciduous and coniferous forests, lowland forests and occasionally more open habitats such as bogs and wet meadows. They are also found on banks by standing and flowing waters. In winter, flooding their habitat seems to be no problem.

Drymus brunneus lives hidden in damp, soil litter with fungus and moss. They suck at seeds of various herbaceous plants and trees, such as Birch (Betula) and Alder (Alnus). At favourable temperatures, the adults are active even in winter. Usually one generation per year occurs in Central Europe. The development cycle is seasonal, but not uniformly, so that the egg-laying can occur at different times of year in different parts of the range; thus overwintering can occur as imago or as egg.
