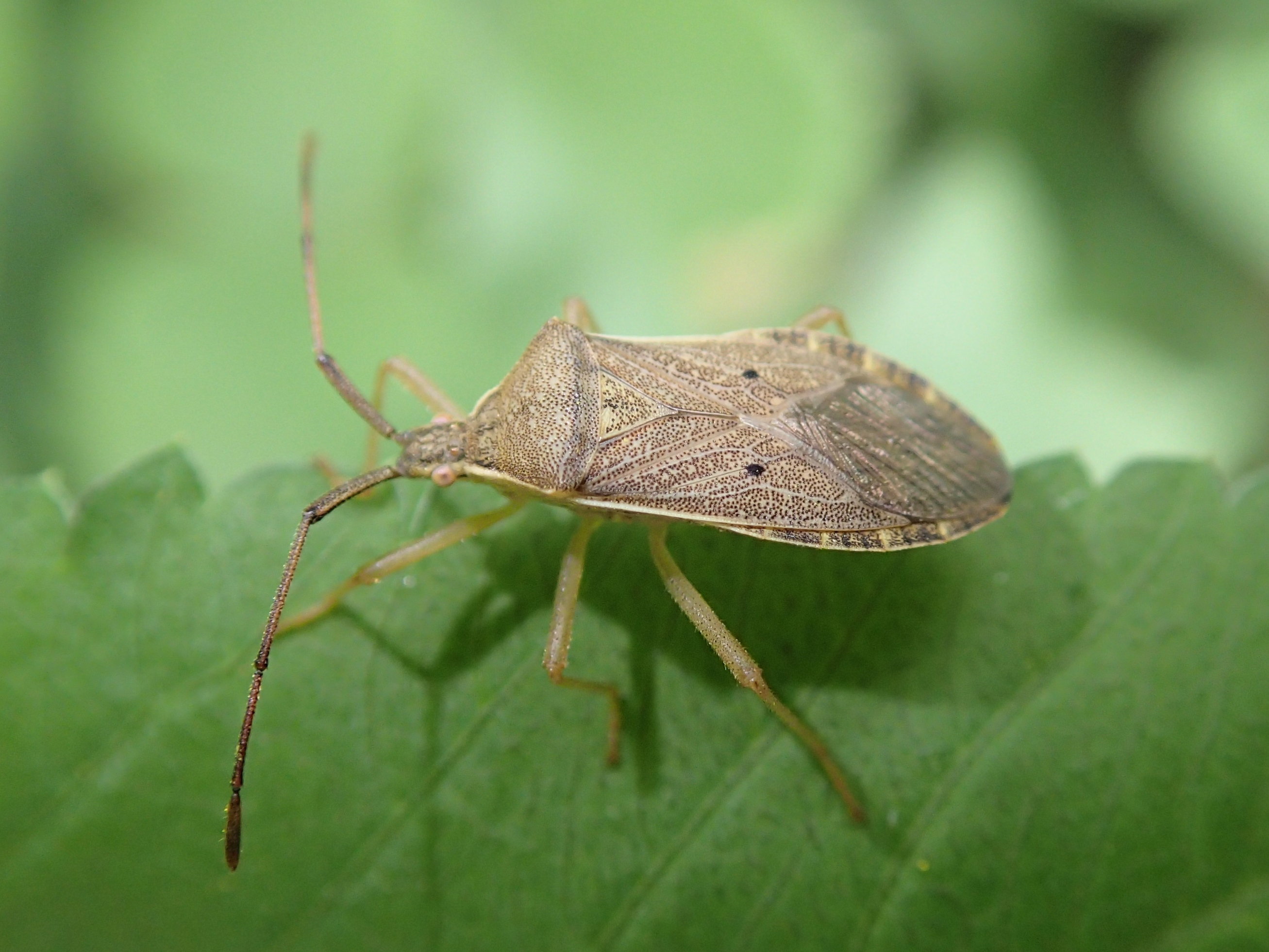
- Homoeocerus unipunctatus

Scientific classification
- Kingdom: Animalia
- Phylum: Arthropoda
- Class: Insecta
- Order: Hemiptera
- Suborder: Heteroptera
- Family: Coreidae
- Subfamily: Coreinae
- Tribe: Homoeocerini
- Genus: Homoeocerus; Burmeister, 1835

Subgenera
- Anacanthocoris; Tliponius

Diversity
- at least 120 species

= Homoeocerus =

Genus of true bugs

Homoeocerus is a genus of leaf-footed bug in the family Coreidae. There are more than 120 described species in Homoeocerus, found in south and east Asia, and Sub-Saharan Africa.

== See also ==
- List of Homoeocerus species
