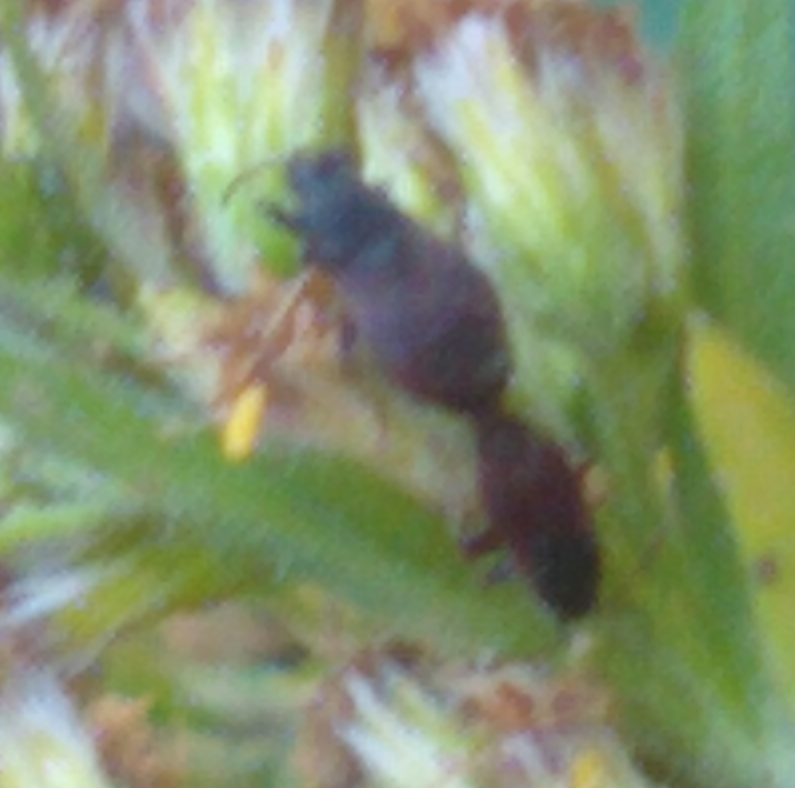

Scientific classification
- Domain: Eukaryota
- Kingdom: Animalia
- Phylum: Arthropoda
- Class: Insecta
- Order: Hemiptera
- Suborder: Heteroptera
- Family: Rhyparochromidae
- Genus: Drymus
- Species: D. unus

Binomial name
- Drymus unus (Say, 1832)

= Drymus unus =

Species of true bug

Drymus unus is a species of dirt-colored seed bug in the family Rhyparochromidae. It is found in North America.
