= Colobathristidae =

Scientific classification
- Domain: Eukaryota
- Kingdom: Animalia
- Phylum: Arthropoda
- Class: Insecta
- Order: Hemiptera
- Suborder: Heteroptera
- Infraorder: Pentatomomorpha
- Superfamily: Lygaeoidea
- Family: Colobathristidae; Stal, 1865

Family of true bugs

Colobathristidae is a family of true bugs in the order Hemiptera. There are more than 20 genera and 90 described species in Colobathristidae.

== Genera ==
These 26 genera belong to the family Colobathristidae:

- Brachyphyma Horvath, 1904
- Bradaloria Stys & Henry, 2015
- Calliseidus Horvath, 1904
- Carvalhoia Kormilev, 1951
- Centromus Bergroth, 1910
- Colobasiastes Breddin, 1903
- Colobathristes Burmeister, 1835
- Dayakiella Horvath, 1922
- Diascopoea Horvath, 1904
- Diplodontella Horvath, 1922
- Discocentrus Horvath, 1922
- Elopura Horvath, 1922
- Molybditis Bergroth, 1910
- Narcegaster Horvath, 1904
- Neocolobrathristes Kormilev, 1951
- Neolabradoria Stys & Henry, 2015
- Paraelopura Kormilev, 1953
- Parathristes Carvalho & Henry, 1986
- Peruda Distant, 1888
- Perudella Kormilev, 1949
- Phaenacantha Horvath, 1904
- Piptocentrus Horvath, 1904
- Schuhacantha Stys & Exnerova, 2012
- Symphylax Horvath, 1904
- Taphrocranum Horvath, 1904
- Trichocentrus Horvath, 1904
