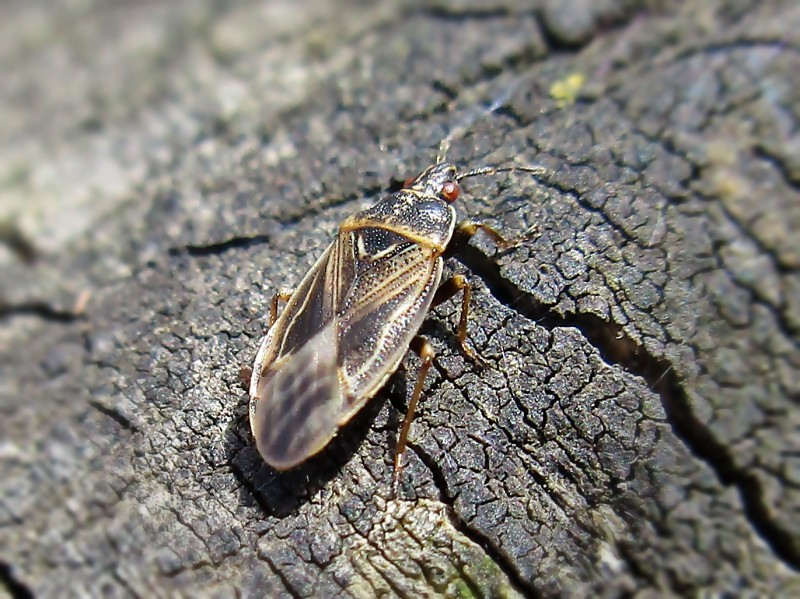
- Chilacis typhae

Scientific classification
- Kingdom: Animalia
- Phylum: Arthropoda
- Class: Insecta
- Order: Hemiptera
- Suborder: Heteroptera
- Family: Artheneidae
- Genus: Chilacis; Fieber, 1864

= Chilacis =

Genus of true bugs

Chilacis is a genus of true bugs in the family Artheneidae. There are at least two described species in Chilacis.

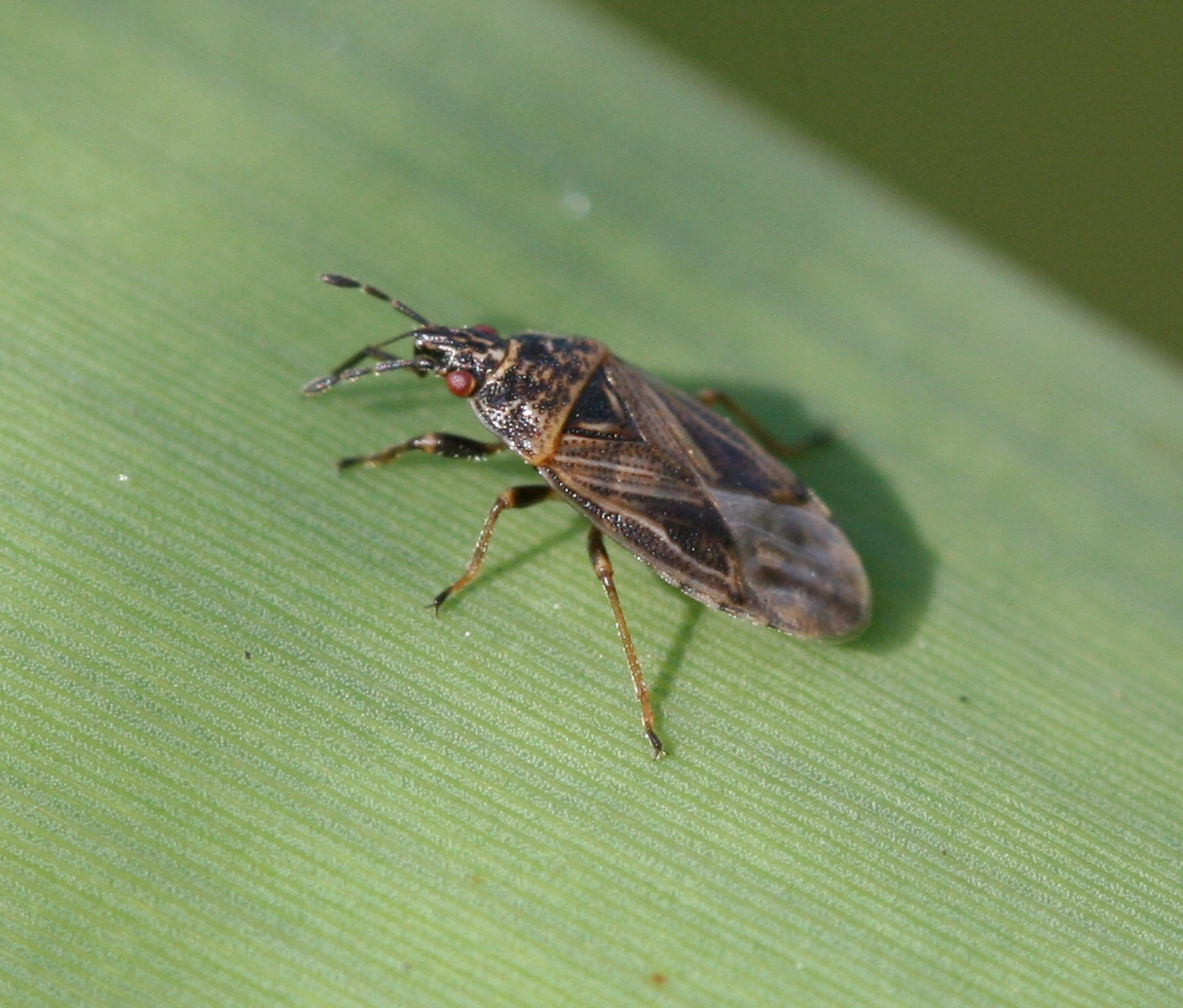
Chilacis typhae

== Species ==
These two species belong to the genus Chilacis:

- Chilacis typhae (Perris, 1857) (bulrush bug)
- † Chilacis univestis Statz & Wagner, 1950
