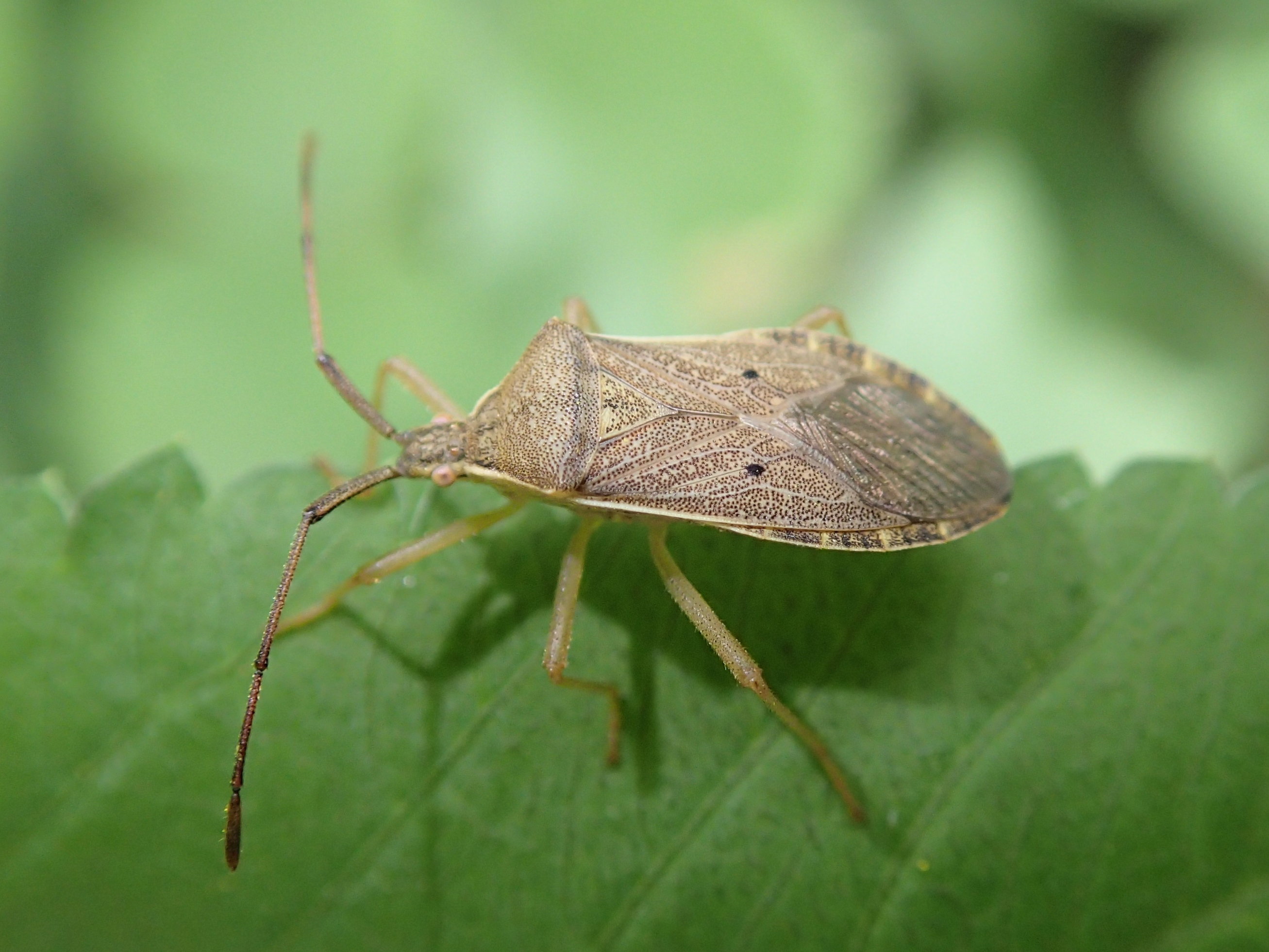
- Homoeocerus unipunctatus

Scientific classification
- Domain: Eukaryota
- Kingdom: Animalia
- Phylum: Arthropoda
- Class: Insecta
- Order: Hemiptera
- Suborder: Heteroptera
- Family: Coreidae
- Subfamily: Coreinae
- Tribe: Homoeocerini; Amyot & Serville, 1843

Synonyms
- Homescérides Amyot & Serville, 1843, also: Homoceridae, Homoeoceraria, Homoeocerida, Homoeoceridae, Homoeoceriden, Homoeocerides, Homoeocerina, Homoeocerinae, Homoeoceroidae Amyot & Serville, 1843

= Homoeocerini =

Tribe of true bugs

The Homoeocerini are a tribe of leaf-footed bugs, in the subfamily Coreinae erected by Amyot and Serville in 1843. Genera are distributed from Africa to South-East Asia.

== Genera ==
The Coreoidea Species File lists:

1. Aschistocoris Bergroth, 1909
2. Ceratopachys Westwood, 1842
3. Diocles (bug) Stål, 1866
4. Fracastorius Distant, 1902
5. Homoeocerus Burmeister, 1835
6. Omanocoris Kiritshenko, 1916
7. Ornytus (bug) Dallas, 1852
8. Prismatocerus Amyot & Serville, 1843
9. Uranocoris Walker, 1871
