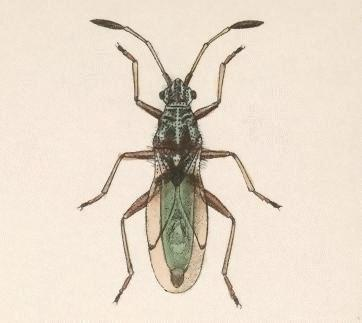
- Neoninus illustris

Scientific classification
- Domain: Eukaryota
- Kingdom: Animalia
- Phylum: Arthropoda
- Class: Insecta
- Order: Hemiptera
- Suborder: Heteroptera
- Infraorder: Pentatomomorpha
- Superfamily: Lygaeoidea
- Family: Ninidae; Barber, 1956

= Ninidae =

Family of true bugs

Ninidae is a family of true bugs in the order Hemiptera. There are about 5 genera and 14 described species in Ninidae.

== Genera ==
These five genera belong to the family Ninidae:

- Cymoninus Breddin, 1907
- Neoninus Distant, 1893
- Ninomimus Lindberg, 1934
- Ninus Stal, 1860
- Paraninus Scudder, 1957
