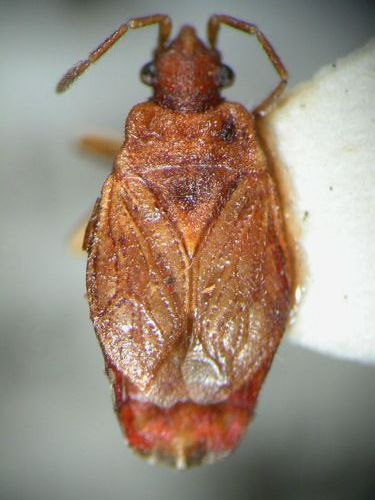
- Henicocoris monteithi

Scientific classification
- Kingdom: Animalia
- Phylum: Arthropoda
- Clade: Pancrustacea
- Class: Insecta
- Order: Hemiptera
- Suborder: Heteroptera
- Infraorder: Pentatomomorpha
- Superfamily: Idiostoloidea
- Family: Henicocoridae; Woodward, 1968
- Genus: Henicocoris; Woodward, 1968
- Species: H. monteithi

Binomial name
- Henicocoris monteithi Woodward, 1968

= Henicocoris =

Genus of insects

Henicocoridae is a monotypic family of plant bugs created for the genus Henicocoris with the sole species Henicocoris monteithi. It was initially treated as a subfamily Henicocorinae under the Lygaeidae for the new genus Henicoris described in 1968 on the basis of a specimen collected in Queensland, Australia. It was later elevated to family rank and phylogenetic studies place it as a sister of the family Idiostolidae and is placed under the superorder Idiostoloidea within the Pentatomomorpha.

Bugs in the family have an elongate ovoid outline and the head has ocelli. They have a four-segmented antenna and have three tarsal segments. The species was found in rainforest in Queensland, running actively on the ground at night. It lacks well-developed hindwings. The spiracles are ventrally placed.
