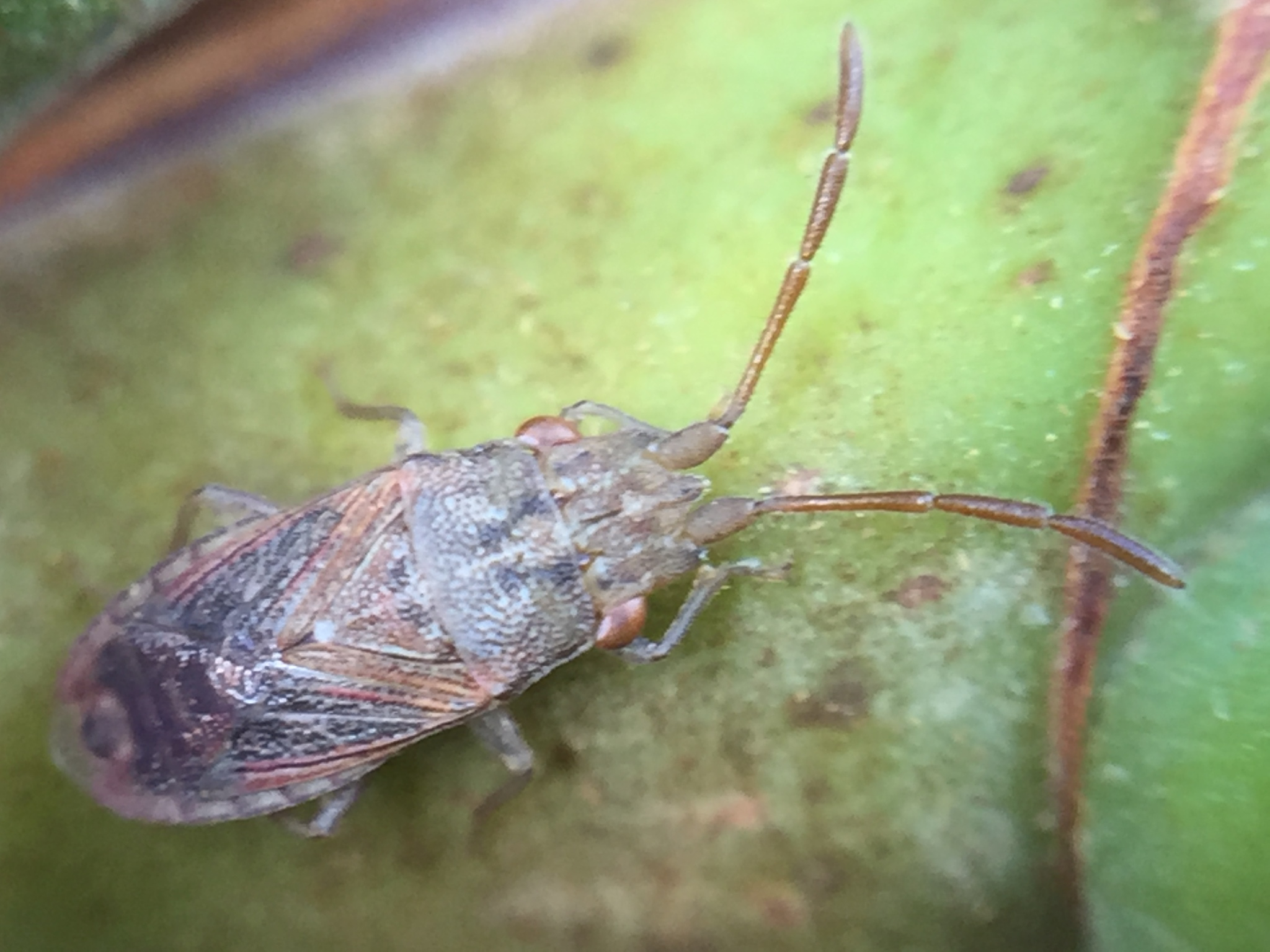
- Meschia barrowensis (Heteroptera, Meschiidae), observed by Stephen Thorpe on April 8, 2022 at Auckland University Central Campus & Albert Park, Auckland, New Zealand.

Scientific classification
- Kingdom: Animalia
- Phylum: Arthropoda
- Clade: Pancrustacea
- Class: Insecta
- Order: Hemiptera
- Suborder: Heteroptera
- Family: Meschiidae
- Genus: Meschia; Distant, 1910

= Meschia =

True bugs

Meschia is a genus of true bugs in the family Meschiidae. There are three described species in Meschia.

== Species ==
These three species belong to the genus Meschia:

- Meschia barrowensis Malipatil, 2014
- Meschia pugnax Distant, 1910
- Meschia zoui Gao & Malipatil, 2019
