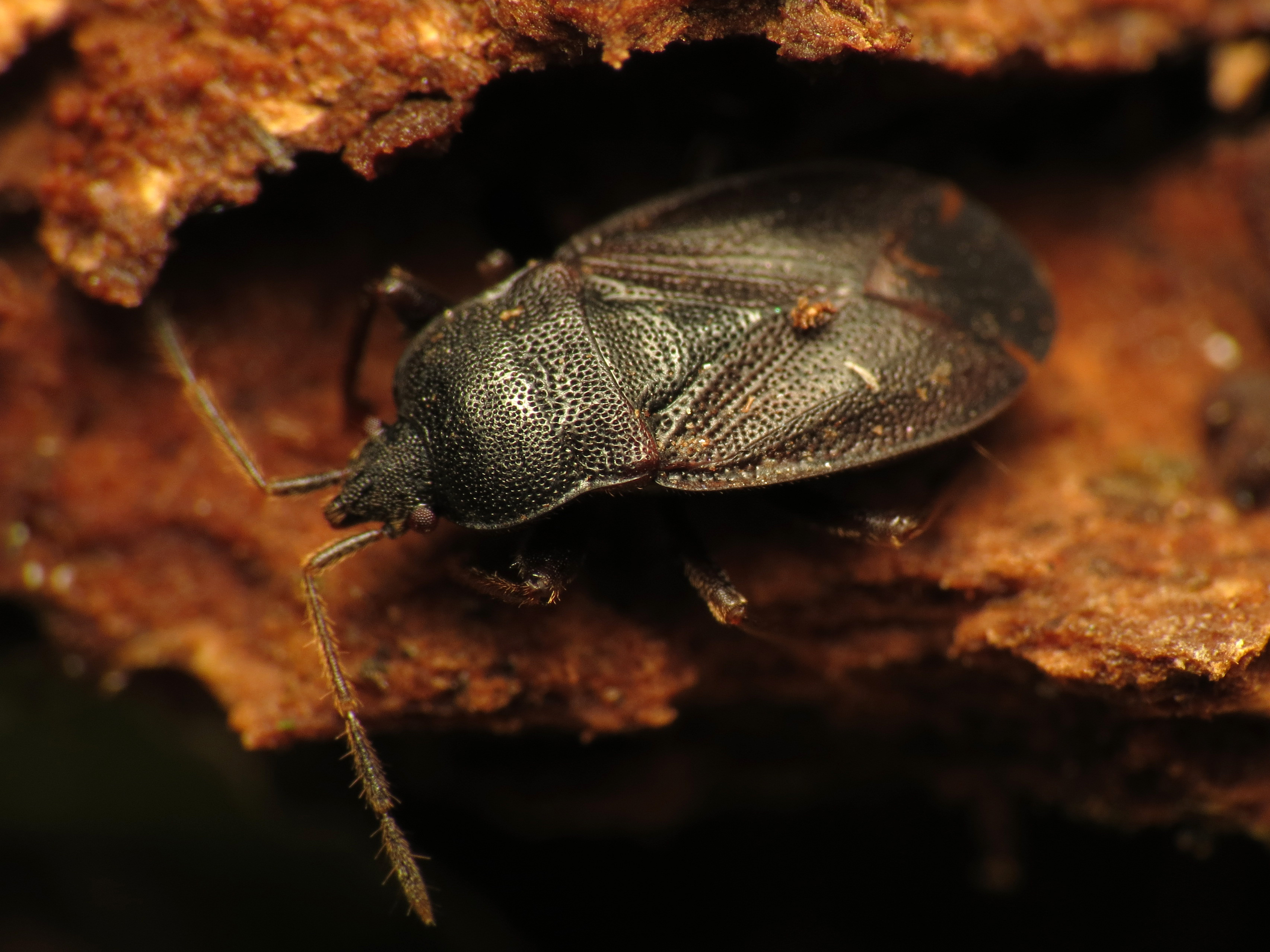

Scientific classification
- Domain: Eukaryota
- Kingdom: Animalia
- Phylum: Arthropoda
- Class: Insecta
- Order: Hemiptera
- Suborder: Heteroptera
- Family: Rhyparochromidae
- Genus: Drymus
- Species: D. crassus

Binomial name
- Drymus crassus Van Duzee, 1910

= Drymus crassus =

Species of true bug

Drymus crassus is a species of dirt-colored seed bugs in the family Rhyparochromidae. It is found in North America.
