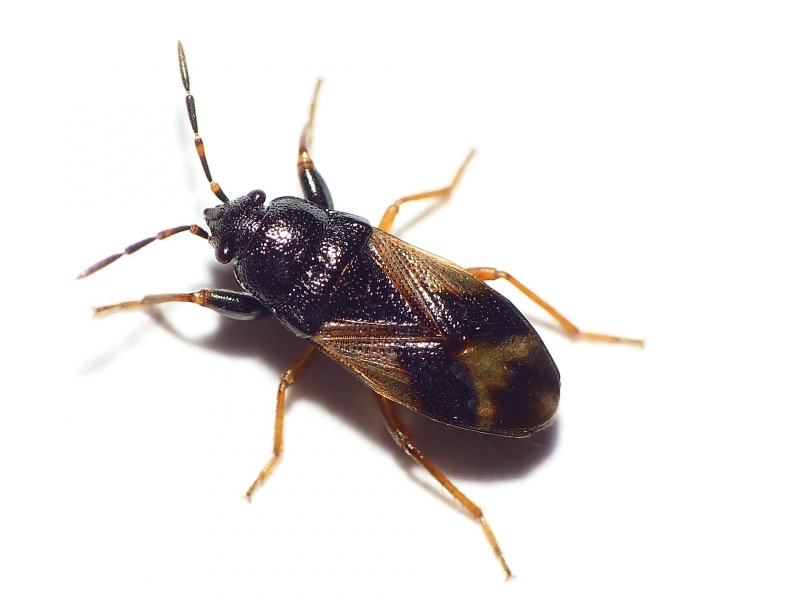
- Megalonotus praetextatus. Dorsal view

Scientific classification
- Domain: Eukaryota
- Kingdom: Animalia
- Phylum: Arthropoda
- Class: Insecta
- Order: Hemiptera
- Suborder: Heteroptera
- Family: Rhyparochromidae
- Genus: Megalonotus
- Species: M. praetextatus

Binomial name
- Megalonotus praetextatus (Herrich-Schaeffer, G.H.W., 1850)

= Megalonotus praetextatus =

Species of true bug

Megalonotus praetextatus is a species of seed bug in the family Rhyparochromidae.

== Distribution ==
This species is present in most of Europe. It can be found from North Africa across the Mediterranean to the south of Scandinavia and the British Isles. In the east, the range extends from Southeastern Europe and Asia Minor across the Caucasus to the Caspian region. In Britain, it occurs rarely and only locally.

== Habitat ==
These ground bugs prefer dry, sunny and warm areas, with sandy and calcareous soils as sand dunes, cliffs, and sandy grasslands.

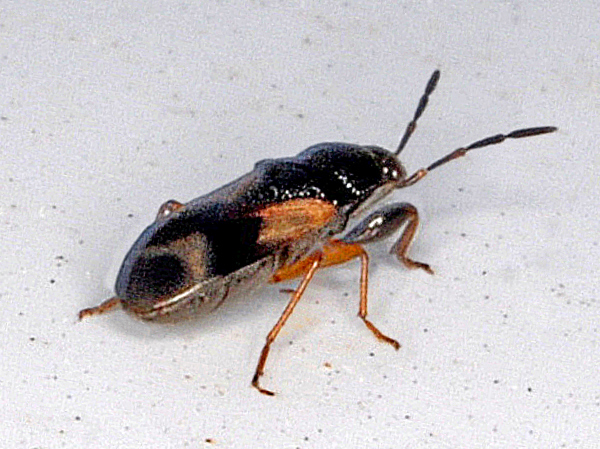
Megalonotus praetextatus. Side view

== Description ==
Megalonotus praetextatus can reach a body length of about 3.9–5.1 mm (0.15–0.20 in). These medium-sized ground bugs have black or dark brown head, scutellum and pronotum. Pronotum is smooth and hairless, very shining on the upper side and heavily punctured, especially across the posterior margin.. Legs are brownish yellow, except femora of the front legs, that are dark brown and show long tooth and several other small teeth. The segments 1 and 2 of the antennae are black below and yellow brown above, while the segments 3 and 4 are black. The front wings are glossy and partly yellow-brown. The membrane is blackish.

== Biology ==
Megalonotus praetextatus is a univoltine species, with new generation from July or August. The adult bugs overwinter. They are usually associated with Geraniaceae (Erodium, Geranium), but they are polyphagous and also feed on the seed of other plants.
