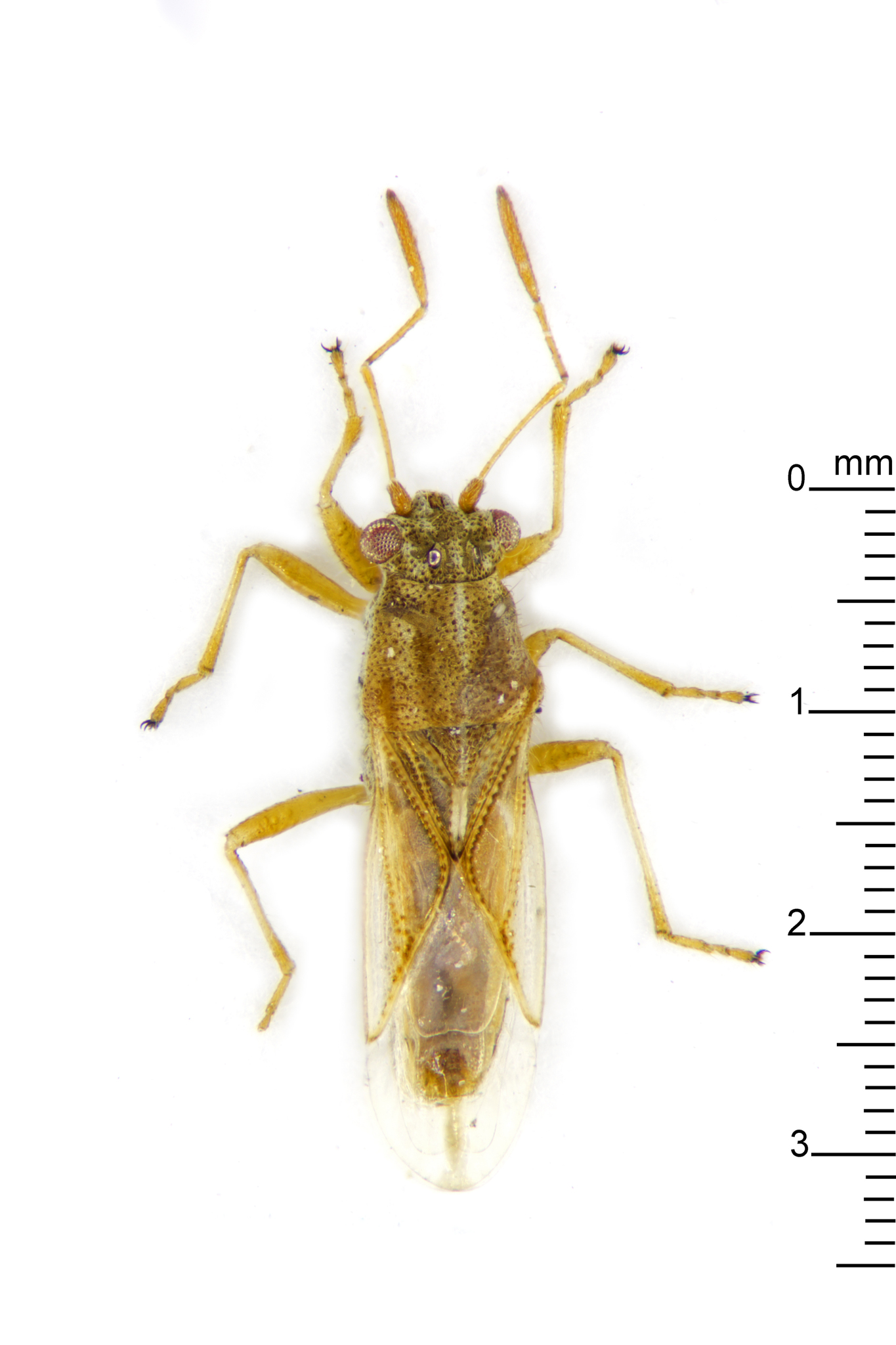
- A cymoninus sechellensis insect

Scientific classification
- Kingdom: Animalia
- Phylum: Arthropoda
- Class: Insecta
- Order: Hemiptera
- Suborder: Heteroptera
- Family: Ninidae
- Genus: Cymoninus; Breddin, 1907

= Cymoninus =

Genus of true bugs

Cymoninus is a genus of true bugs in the family Ninidae. There are at least four described species in Cymoninus.

== Species ==
These four species belong to the genus Cymoninus:

- Cymoninus notabilis (Distant, 1893)
- Cymoninus sechellensis (Bergroth, 1893)
- Cymoninus turaensis (Paiva, 1919)
- Cymoninus wilcoxae Brailovsky, 1975
