= Carl John Drake =

American entomologist and zoologist

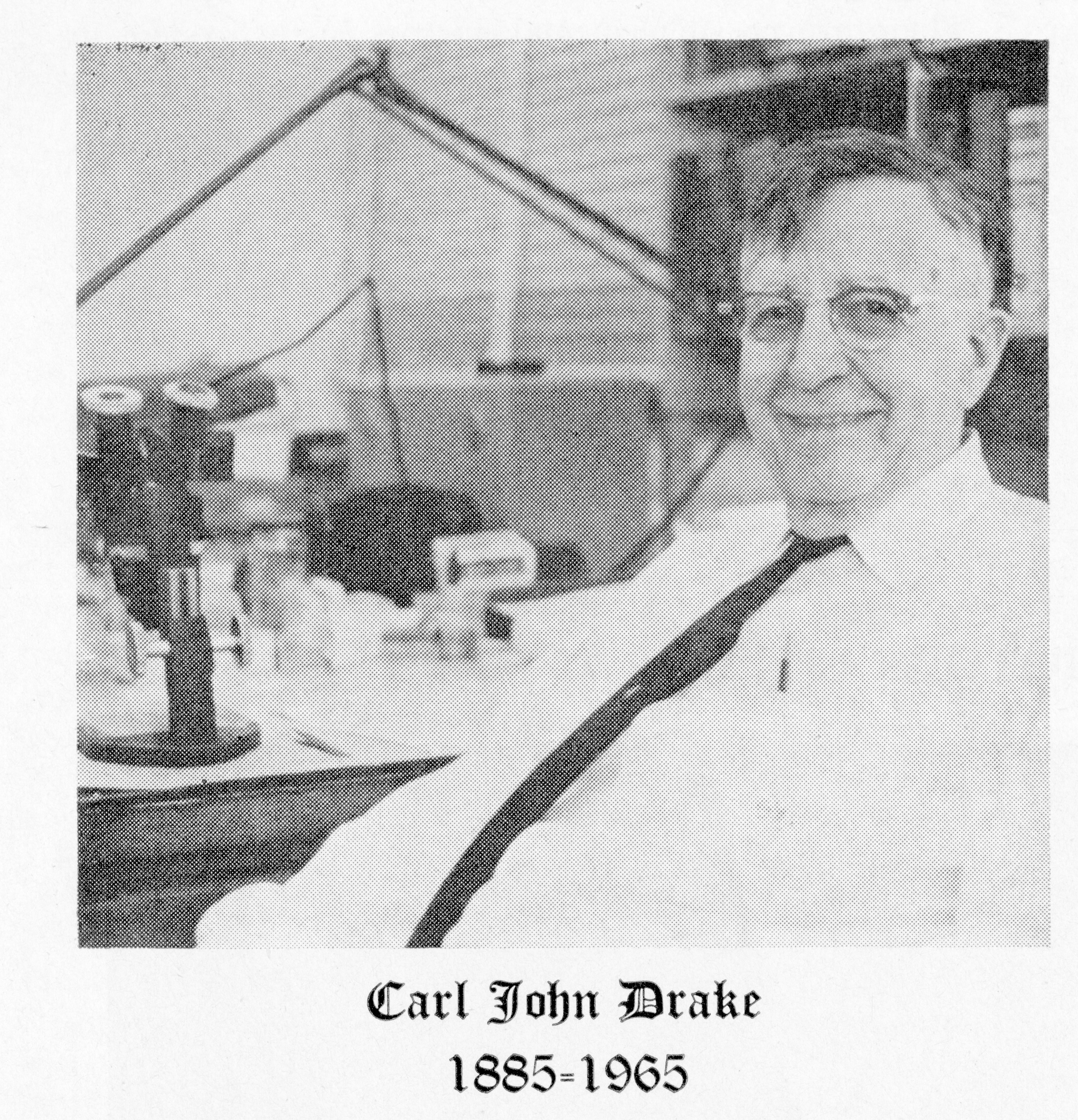
- In 1960 (Smithsonian Institution Archives)
- Born: July 28, 1885
- Died: October 2, 1965 (aged 80); USA
- Scientific career
- Fields: Entomology; Zoology
- Institutions: Ohio State University; Syracuse University; Iowa State University; Tucara Commission; United States National Museum

Carl John Drake (July 28, 1885— October 2, 1965) was an American entomologist and zoologist. He specialized in the systematics of the Hemiptera apart from applied entomology in the control of crop pests.

== Biography ==
Drake was born in 1885, in Eaglesville, Ohio, where he grew up on a farm. He studied in Seneca County, Heidelberg Academy, Tiffin, before going to Baldwin-Wallace College where he obtained a Bachelor of Science and Bachelor of Pedantics in 1912. He was introduced to entomology by Herbert Osborn. He then went to Ohio State University receiving an MA in 1914 and a doctorate in 1921. After he graduated from University, he taught zoology in Ohio State University, starting from 1913 till 1915. From 1915 to 1922 he taught at Syracuse University, and in 1922 at Department of Zoology and Entomology at Iowa State University, where he became the head and also the State Entomologist. In the same place, he served as a head of the Entomology Section of the Agricultural Experiment Station. His farming background and the knowledge of entomology helped him to solve problems with practical ideas for controlling the grasshoppers, chinch bugs, Hessian fly, and other insect pests. He suggested late planting to overcome Hessian fly infestations at no cost. From 1938 to 1939 he served on some of the national entomological organizations and was in charge of the Tucara Commission in Argentina. In 1957, he joined the United States National Museum where he got a position as Honorary Research Associate. Although he worked on a variety of pest species over his long career, Drake was a specialist on lace bugs (Tingidae). He published over 350 entomological papers, including a 700-page catalog of Tingidae in the Bulletin of the U.S. National Museum. He died in 1965 from untreated diabetes., leaving the Smithsonian a large Hemiptera collection and an endowment to support the acquisition of additional collections.
