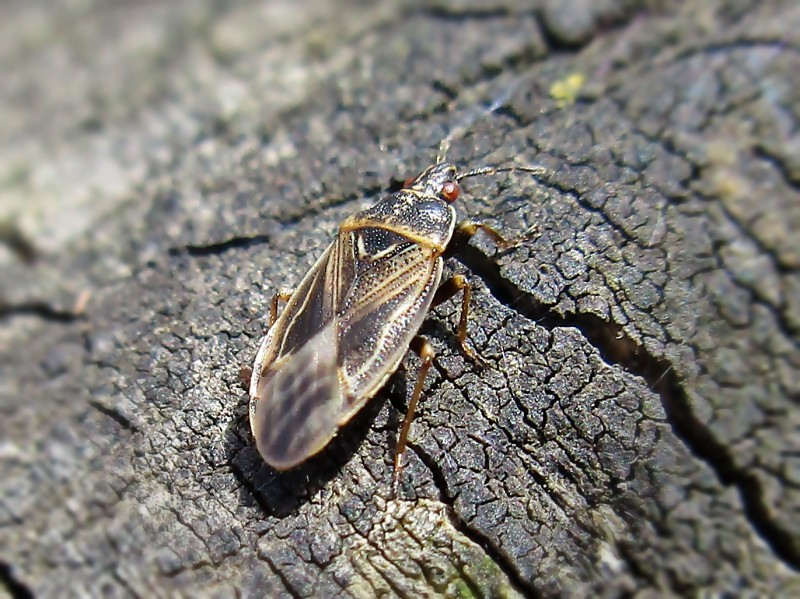
- Chilacis typhae

Scientific classification
- Kingdom: Animalia
- Phylum: Arthropoda
- Class: Insecta
- Order: Hemiptera
- Suborder: Heteroptera
- Infraorder: Pentatomomorpha
- Superfamily: Lygaeoidea
- Family: Artheneidae; Stål, 1872

Subfamilies
- See text

= Artheneidae =

Family of true bugs

Artheneidae is a family of true bugs in the order Hemiptera. It was previously classified within the family Lygaeidae. Approximately 7 genera and at least 20 described species belong to the family Artheneidae.

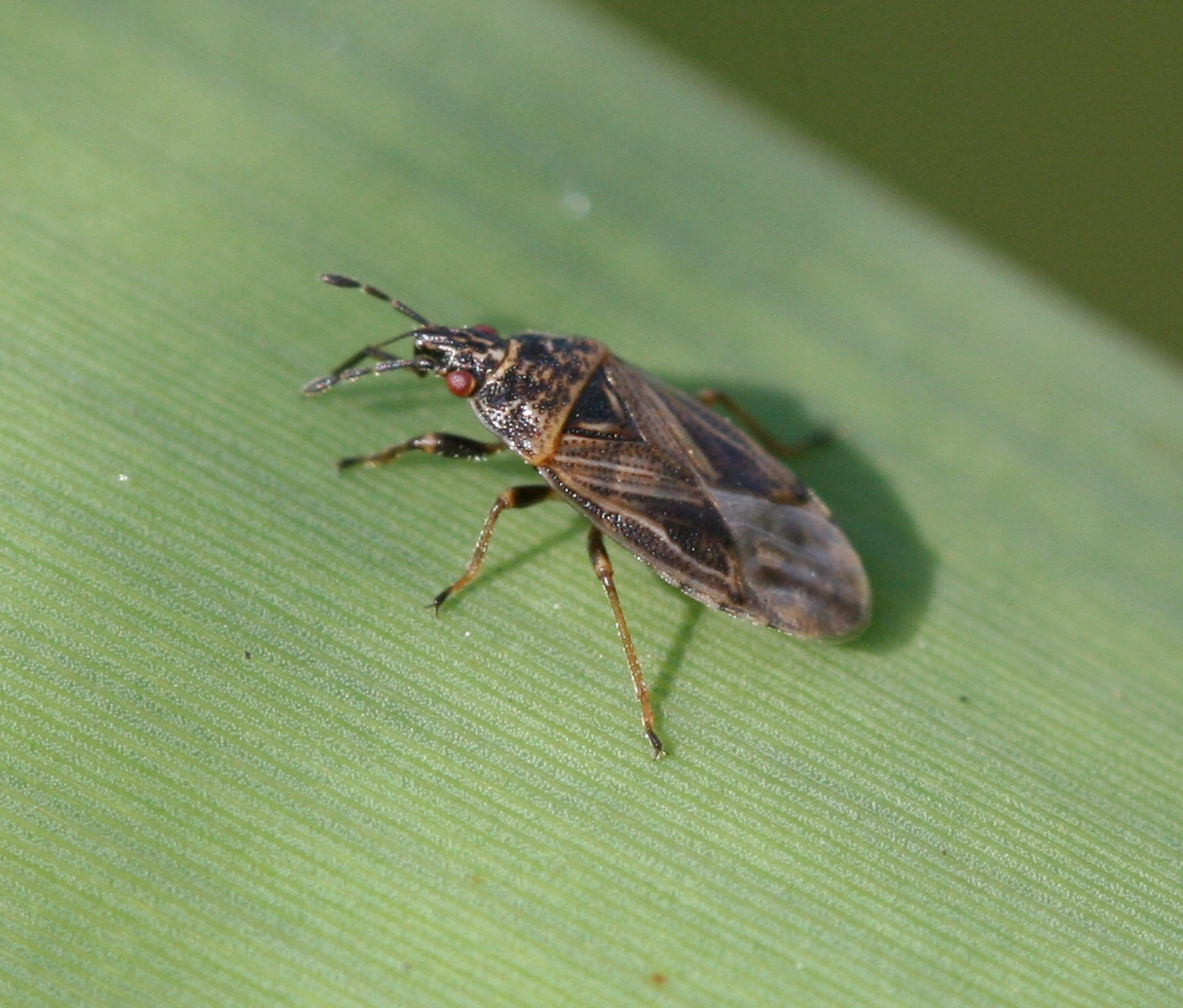
Chilacis typhae

== Genera ==
Genera are placed in three subfamilies:

=== Artheneinae ===
Authority: Stål, 1872

- Artheneidea Kiritshenko, 1913
- Artheneis Spinola, 1837
- Chilacis Fieber, 1864
- Holcocranum Fieber, 1860
- Teutates Distant, 1909

Dilompinae Slater, Woodward & Sweet, 1962

- Dilompus Scudder, 1957

Nothochrominae Slater, Woodward & Sweet, 1962

- Nothochromus Slater, Woodward & Sweet, 1962
