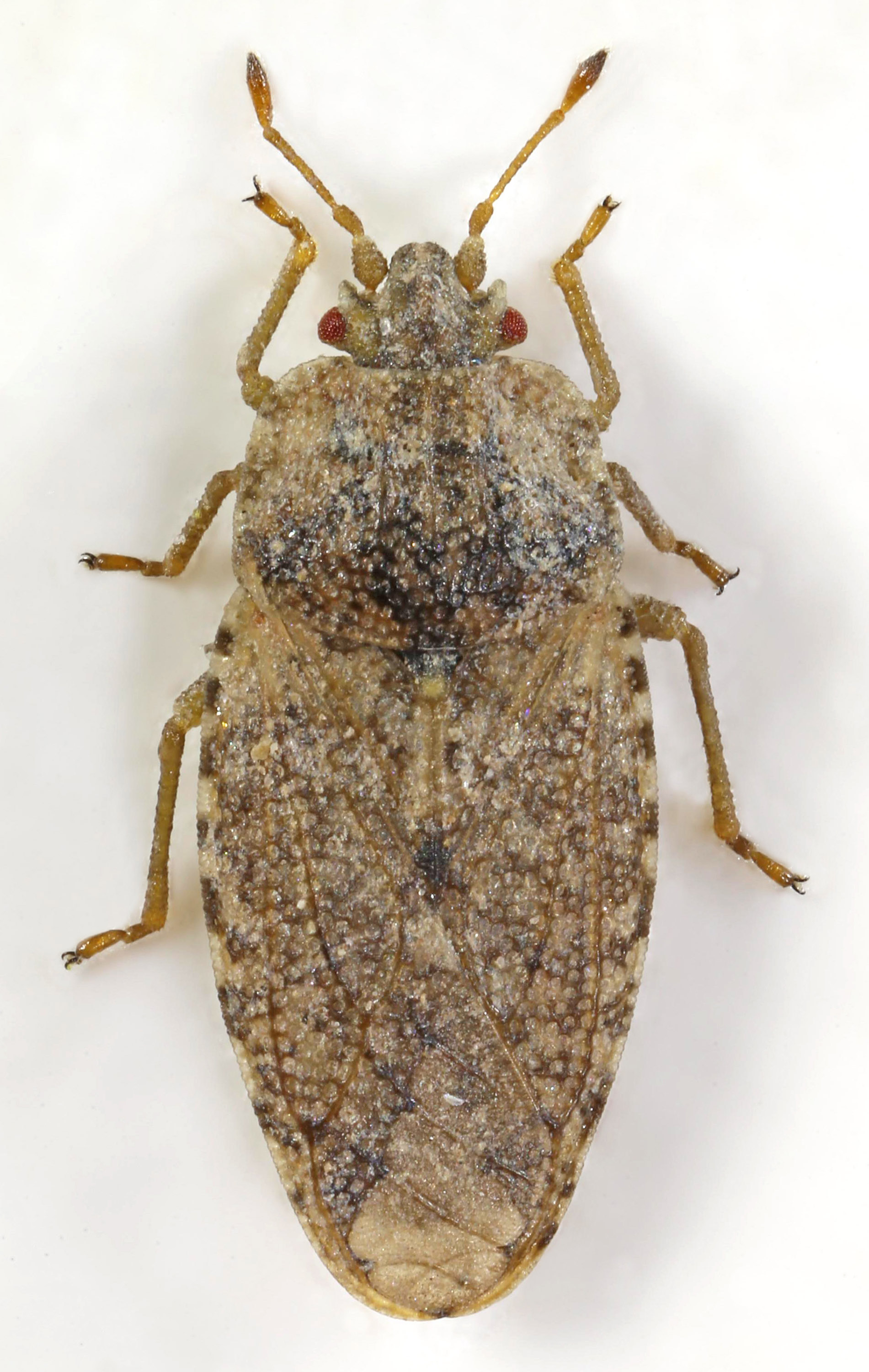
- Parapiesma quadratum

Scientific classification
- Domain: Eukaryota
- Kingdom: Animalia
- Phylum: Arthropoda
- Class: Insecta
- Order: Hemiptera
- Suborder: Heteroptera
- Family: Piesmatidae
- Genus: Parapiesma; Pericart, 1974

= Parapiesma =

Genus of true bugs

Parapiesma is a genus of true bugs belonging to the family Piesmatidae.

The species of this genus are found in Europe and Northern America.

Species:

- Parapiesma atriplicis (Frey-Gessner, 1863)
- Parapiesma cinereum (Say, 1832)
