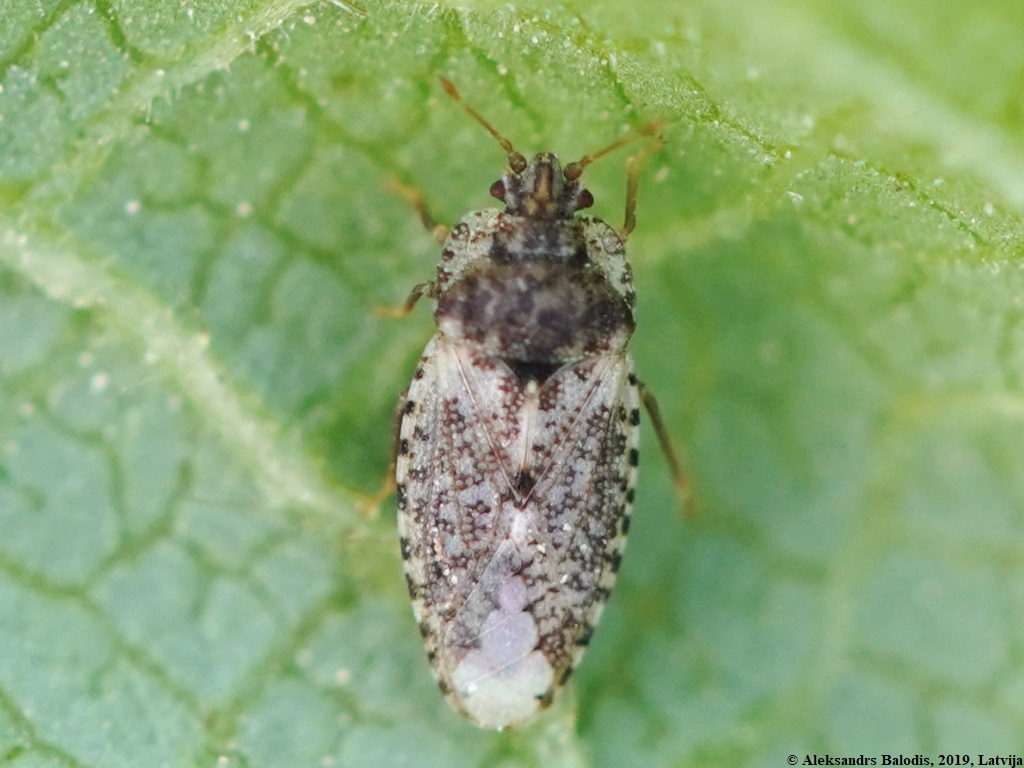
- Parapiesma quadratum

Scientific classification
- Kingdom: Animalia
- Phylum: Arthropoda
- Clade: Pancrustacea
- Class: Insecta
- Order: Hemiptera
- Suborder: Heteroptera
- Superfamily: Lygaeoidea
- Family: Piesmatidae; Amyot & Audinet-Serville, 1843

Type genus
- Piesma Lepelitier & Serville, 1825

= Piesmatidae =

Family of insects

Piesmatidae is a small family of true bugs, commonly called ash-grey leaf bugs. The Piesmatidae are distributed mostly in the temperate Northern Hemisphere, with some occurring in Africa, Australia and South America. A common species found throughout the Americas is Piesma cinereum.

Ash-grey leaf bugs are small insects, some 2–4 mm overall. The head, thorax and the firm part of the wings are extensively dimpled. This resembles the similar pattern of the Tingidae of the infraorder Cimicomorpha, and was initially taken to signify a close relationship. It is due to convergent evolution however.

They feed on plant sap, mostly of Chenopodiaceae and Caryophyllaceae. Piesma linnavouri have been found on Acacia (Fabaceae). Mcateella have been found on many host plants but mostly Acacia and Proteaceae. The host plants of Miespa remain unknown.

== Taxonomy ==
Three subfamilies and eleven genera belong to the family Piesmatidae:

=== Piesmatinae ===
- Afropiesma Pericart, 1974
- † Eopiesma Nel, Waller & De Ploeg, 2004 Oise amber, France, Ypresian
- † Heissiana Popov, 2001 Baltic amber, Rovno amber, Eocene
- Mcateella Drake, 1924
- Miespa Drake, 1948
- Parapiesma Pericart, 1974
- Piesma Lepeletier & Serville, 1825

=== Psamminae ===
- Psammium Breddin In Schumacher, 1913
- Saxicoris Slater, 1970
- Sympeplus Bergroth, 1921

=== Removed from Piesmatidae ===
- † Cretopiesma Grimaldi & Engel, 2008 (now in Aradidae)
- Thaicoris Kormilev, 1969 (now in Thaumastocoridae)

Many species were formerly in the type genus Piesma, from which the subgenera Afropiesma and Parapiesma were split off into separate genera. The genus Thaicoris was for some time placed in this family, but it has more recently been suggested that it is a member of the Thaumastocoridae.

There are two fossil genera. Eopiesma from the earliest Eocene (about 55 mya) is still a very basal member of the family. Heissiana, found in Baltic amber from the Eocene might be a northern relative of Mcateella and Miespa but given its distribution it might more comfortably be considered closely related to the ancestor of Eopiesma. From 2007 to 2009 Cretopiesma was placed within the family. Cretopiesma was found in mid-Cretaceous amber from Myanmar and lived about 100 mya (million years ago) and was initially considered to be a primitive piesmatid but this has since been rejected.

The closest relatives of the Piesmatidae remain rather insufficiently determined. After the ash-grey leaf bugs were recognized as Pentatomomorpha, they were most often placed in the Lygaeoidea based on cladistic analysis, with their relatives variously presumed to be the Berytidae, Colobathristidae and Malcidae, or the peculiar, beetle-like Psamminae, a subfamily of the Lygaeidae. For some time, the Psamminae were even included in the Piesmatidae.

Alternatively, the ash-grey leaf bugs were considered Pentatomomorpha incertae sedis or placed in a monotypic superfamily Piesmatoidea with the discovery of Cretopiesma. However a cladistic analysis rejected Cretopiesma from Piesmatidae and placed the genus in the family Aradidae.
