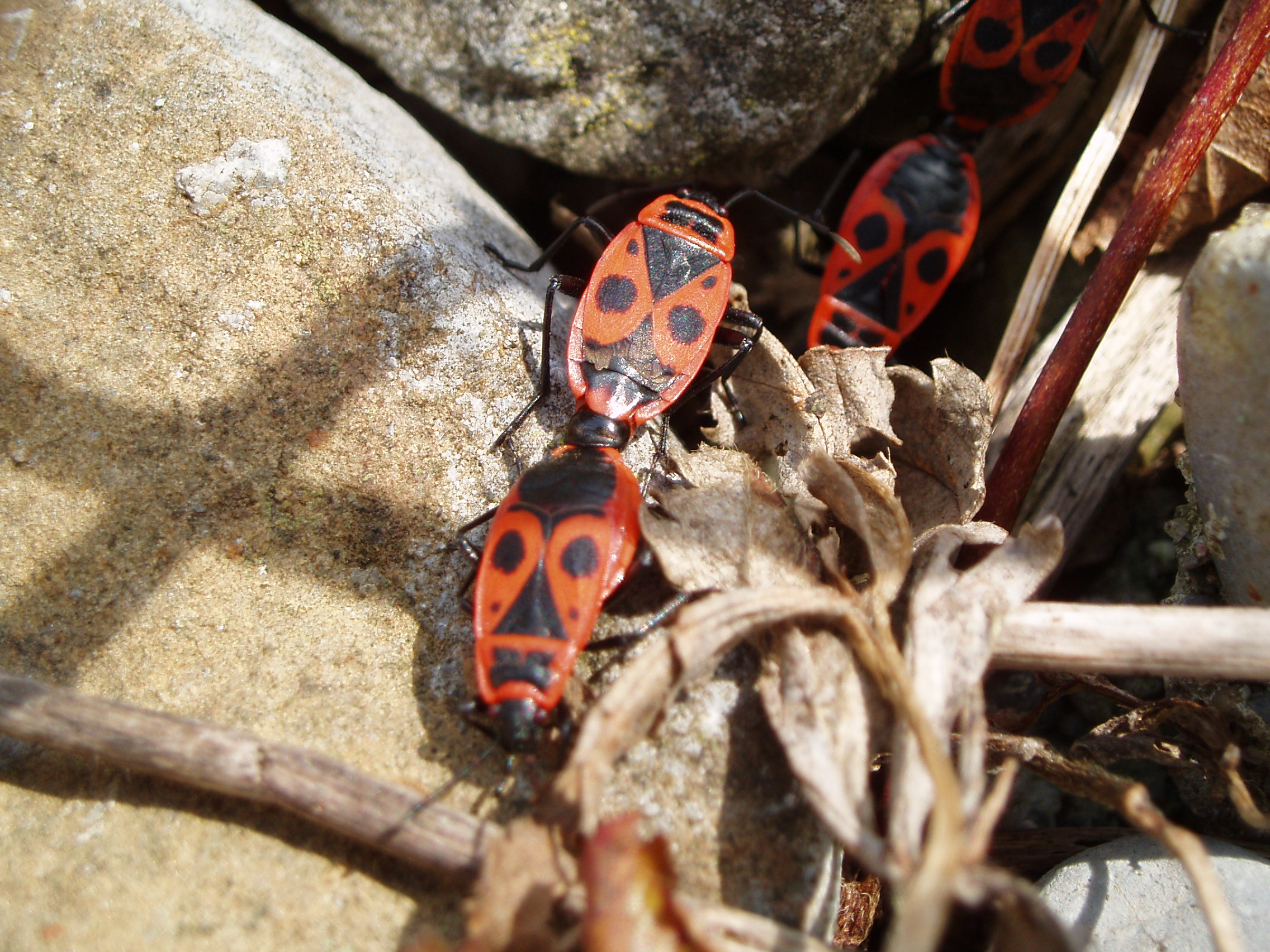
- Firebug Pyrrhocoris apterus

Scientific classification
- Domain: Eukaryota
- Kingdom: Animalia
- Phylum: Arthropoda
- Class: Insecta
- Order: Hemiptera
- Suborder: Heteroptera
- Infraorder: Pentatomomorpha
- Superfamily: Pyrrhocoroidea; Amyot & Serville, 1843

Families
- Pyrrhocoridae - red bugs Largidae - bordered bugs

= Pyrrhocoroidea =

Superfamily of true bugs

Pyrrhocoroidea is a superfamily of true bugs in the infraorder Pentatomomorpha.

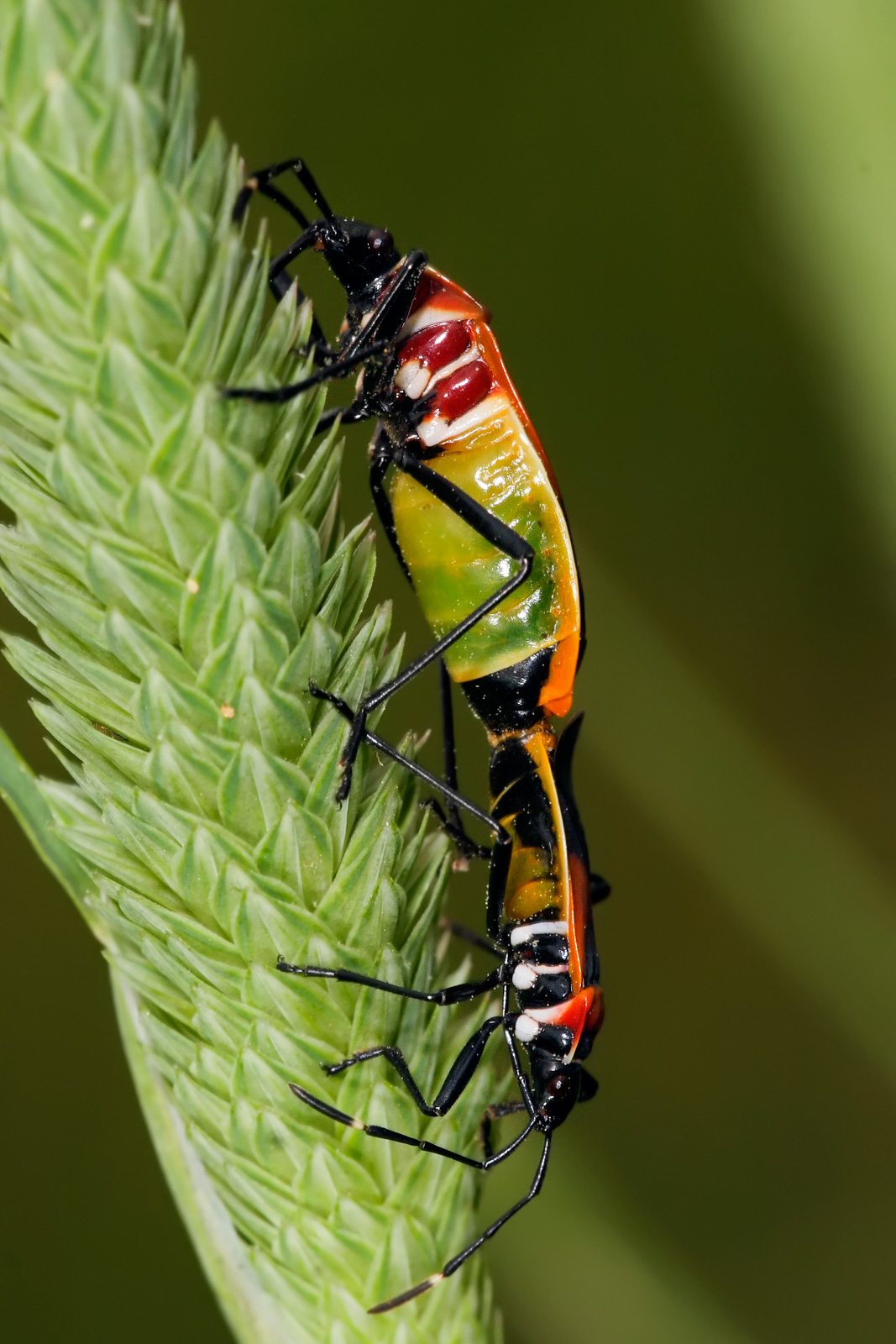
Largid bugs mating
