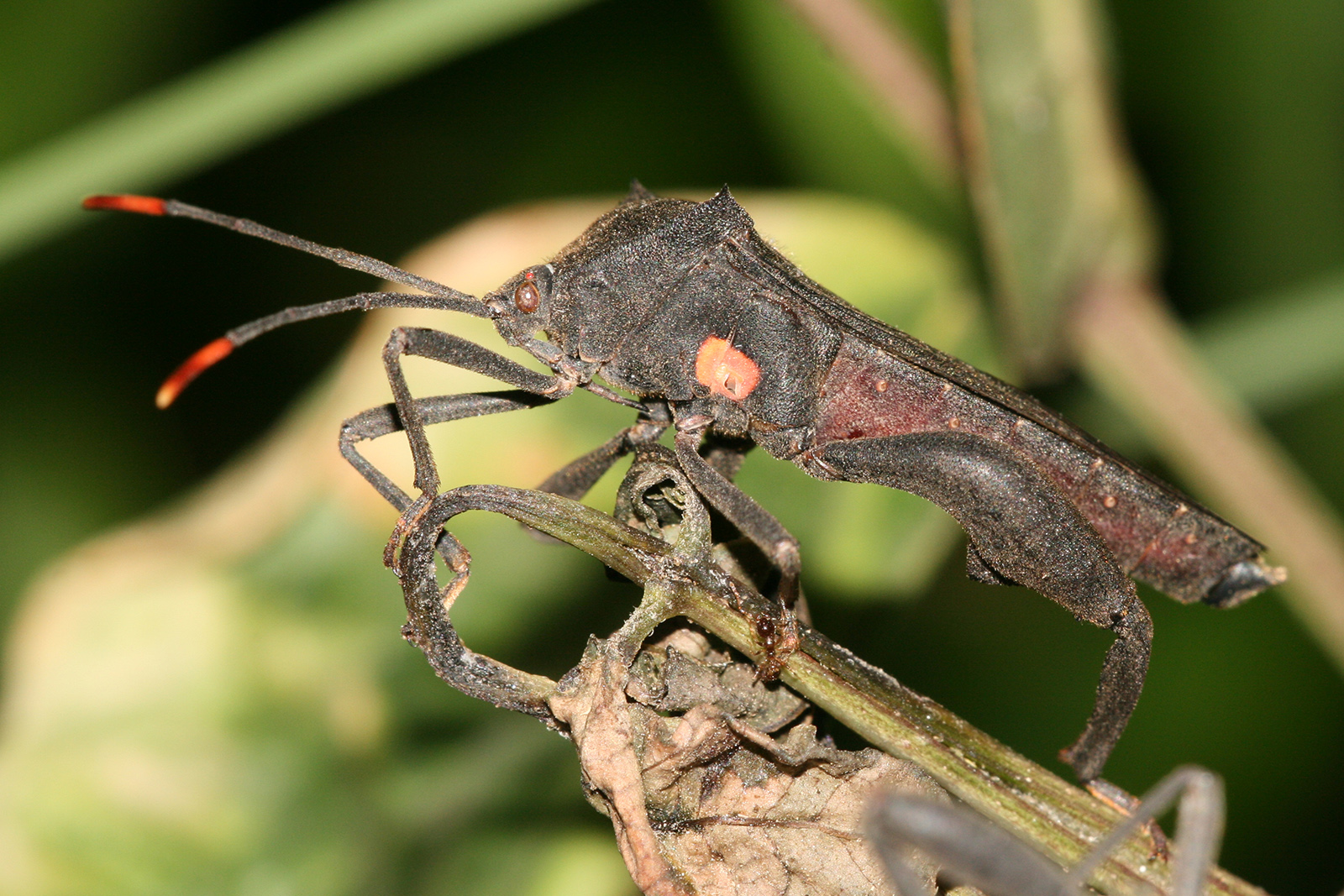
- Squash bug, Coreidae

Scientific classification
- Kingdom: Animalia
- Phylum: Arthropoda
- Clade: Pancrustacea
- Class: Insecta
- Order: Hemiptera
- Suborder: Heteroptera
- Infraorder: Pentatomomorpha

Superfamilies
- 5–7, see text

= Pentatomomorpha =

Pentatomomorpha Temporal range: Late Triassic–Recent

Infraorder of true bugs

The Pentatomomorpha are an infraorder of insects in the true bug order Hemiptera. The group includes such animals as the shield- or stink-bugs (Pentatomidae and alies), flat bugs (Aradidae), seed bugs (Lygaeidae and Rhyparochromidae), etc. They are closely related to the Cimicomorpha.

Based on the fossil morphology, the common ancestor of Pentatomomorpha must be older than the fossils in the late Triassic. They play an important role in agriculture and forestry industries and they are also used as controlling agents in studies.

== Systematics ==
Five superfamilies are usually placed in the Pentatomomorpha. The Aradoidea are the sister group to the remaining superfamilies, while the others, often united as clade Trichophora, share a more recent common ancestor:

- Aradoidea Brullé, 1836
- Coreoidea Leach, 1815
- Lygaeoidea Schilling, 1829
- Pentatomoidea Leach, 1815
- Idiostoloidea Stys 1964
- Pyrrhocoroidea Amyot & Serville, 1843

Among these, the Pentatomoidea seem to represent a by and large monophyletic lineage as traditionally understood, while the other three form a close-knit group and are in need of further study. The Idiostolidae were considered a family of the Lygaeoidea, but have been found to be a sister of the Henicocoridae and are now treated under the superfamily Idiostoloidea.

The Piesmatidae, usually placed in the Lygaeoidea also, are sometimes considered incertae sedis, or placed in a monotypic superfamily Piesmatoidea with the discovery of Cretopiesma. However a cladistic analysis rejected Cretopiesma from Piesmatidae and placed the genus in the family Aradidae.
