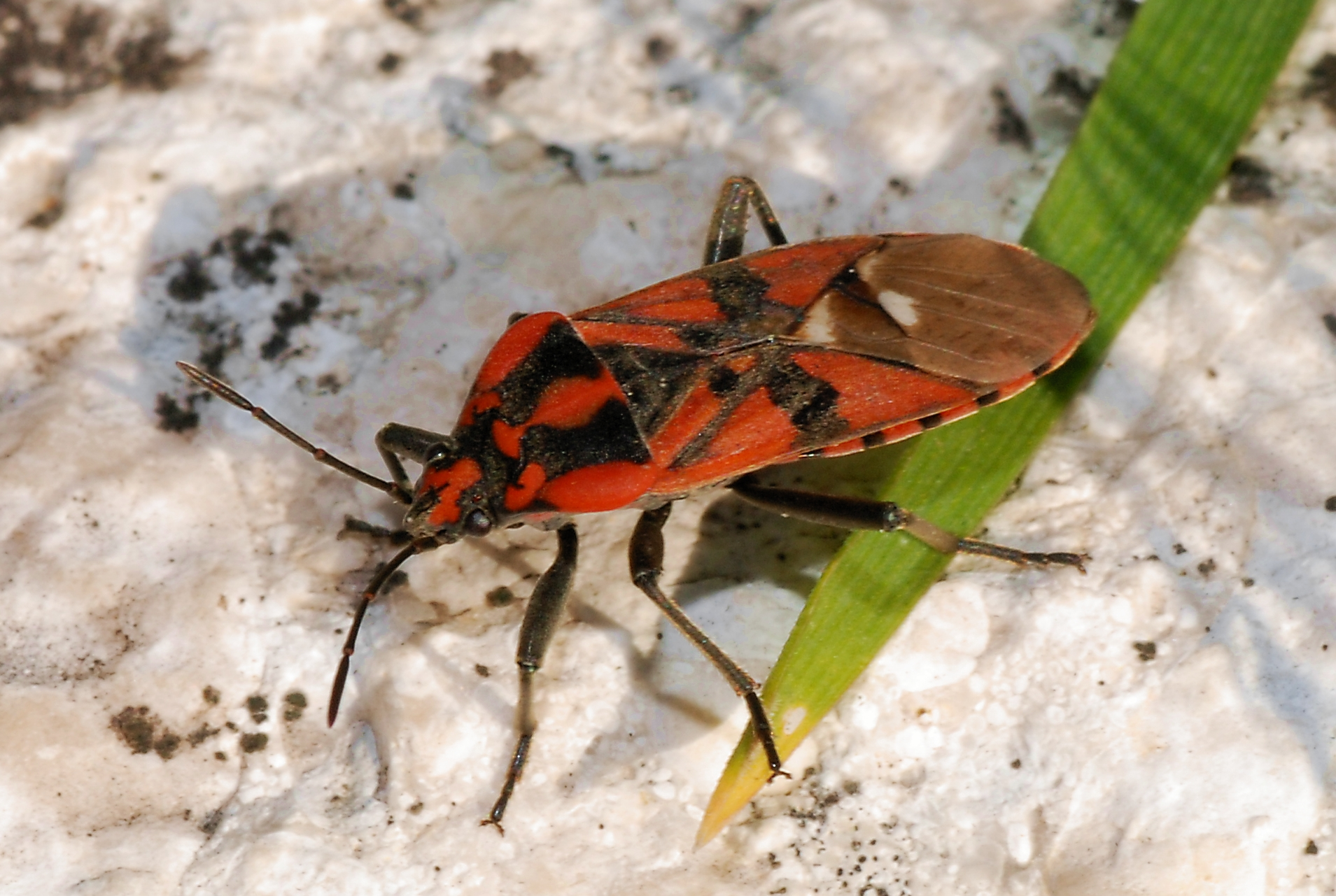
- Spilostethus pandurus (Lygaeidae)

Scientific classification
- Kingdom: Animalia
- Phylum: Arthropoda
- Clade: Pancrustacea
- Class: Insecta
- Order: Hemiptera
- Suborder: Heteroptera
- Infraorder: Pentatomomorpha
- Superfamily: Lygaeoidea; Schilling, 1829

= Lygaeoidea =

Superfamily of true bugs

The Lygaeoidea are a sizeable superfamily of true bugs, containing seed bugs and allies, in the order Hemiptera. There are about 16 families and more than 4,600 described species in Lygaeoidea, found worldwide. Most feed on seeds or sap, but a few are predators.

The ash-gray leaf bug family (Piesmatidae) is generally considered a member of the superfamily Lygaeoidea, but in the past it was sometimes placed in its own superfamily.

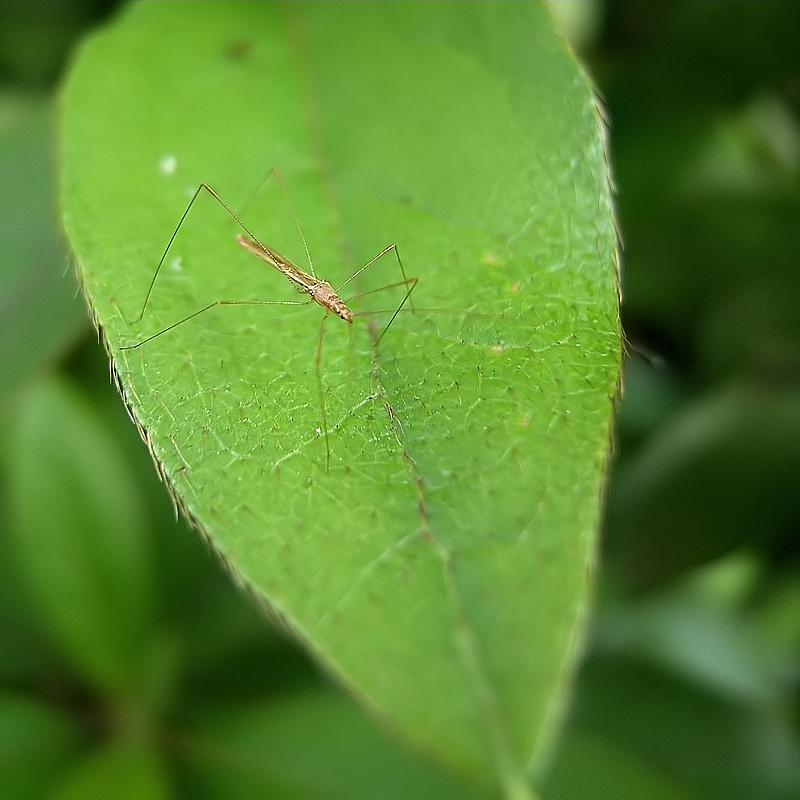
Yemma exilis

== Families ==
These 16 families belong to the superfamily Lygaeoidea. The majority of them were considered to be part of the family Lygaeidae before Thomas J. Henry's work was published in 1997.

- Artheneidae Stål, 1872
- Berytidae Fieber, 1851 (stilt bugs)
- Blissidae Stål, 1862
- Colobathristidae Stal, 1865
- Cryptorhamphidae Hamid, 1971
- Cymidae Baerensprung, 1860
- Geocoridae Baerensprung, 1860 (big-eyed bugs)
- Heterogastridae Stål, 1872
- Lygaeidae Schilling, 1829 (seed bugs)
- Malcidae Stål, 1865
- Meschiidae Malipatil, 2013
- Ninidae Barber, 1956
- Oxycarenidae Stål, 1862
- Pachygronthidae Stål, 1865
- Piesmatidae Amyot & Audinet-Serville, 1843 (ash-gray leaf bugs)
- Rhyparochromidae Amyot & Serville, 1843 (dirt-colored seed bugs)
