= Antilochus (disambiguation) =

Antilochus was the son of Nestor, king of Pylos, in Greek mythology.

Antilochus may also refer to:

- Antilochus (comrade of Odysseus), another character in Greek mythology
- Antilochus (bug), a genus of true bug in the family Pyrrhocoridae
- Antilochus (historian), Ancient Greek historian
- 1583 Antilochus, an asteroid
