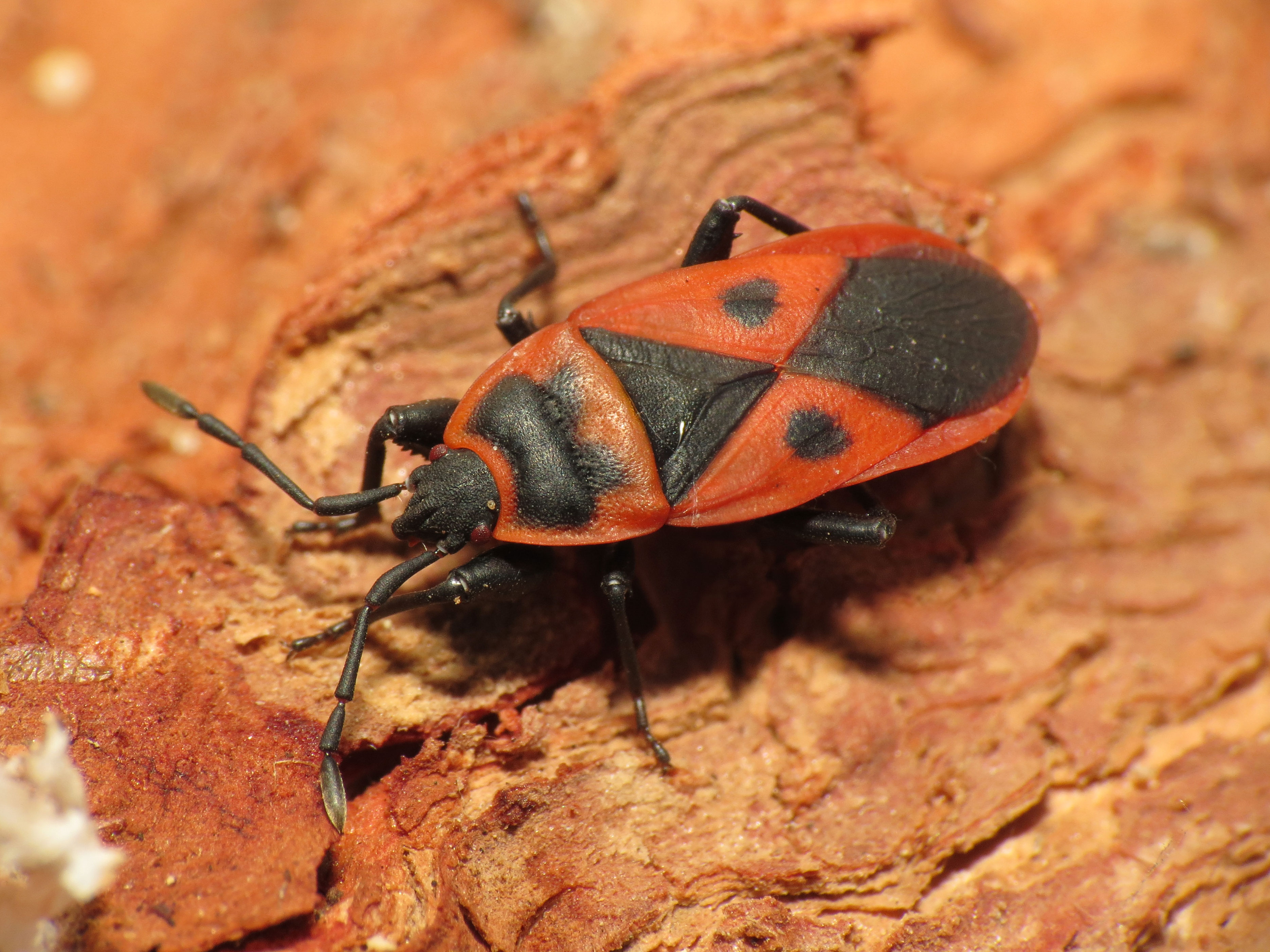

Scientific classification
- Kingdom: Animalia
- Phylum: Arthropoda
- Class: Insecta
- Order: Hemiptera
- Suborder: Heteroptera
- Family: Pyrrhocoridae
- Genus: Scantius
- Species: S. aegyptius

Binomial name
- Scantius aegyptius (Linnaeus, 1758)

= Scantius aegyptius =

Species of true bug

Scantius aegyptius, the Mediterranean red bug, is a species of red bug in the family Pyrrhocoridae, that is a pest of plant species in the family Malvaceae.

These ground-dwelling bugs feed on seeds and seed pods. They are known for their black and red coloration that employs aposematism to deter predators. Their head, antennae and legs are black, and their red back has two round black spots. Nymphs may be completely red, and develop increasing dark spots as they moult. Adults typically measure 7–9 mm in length.

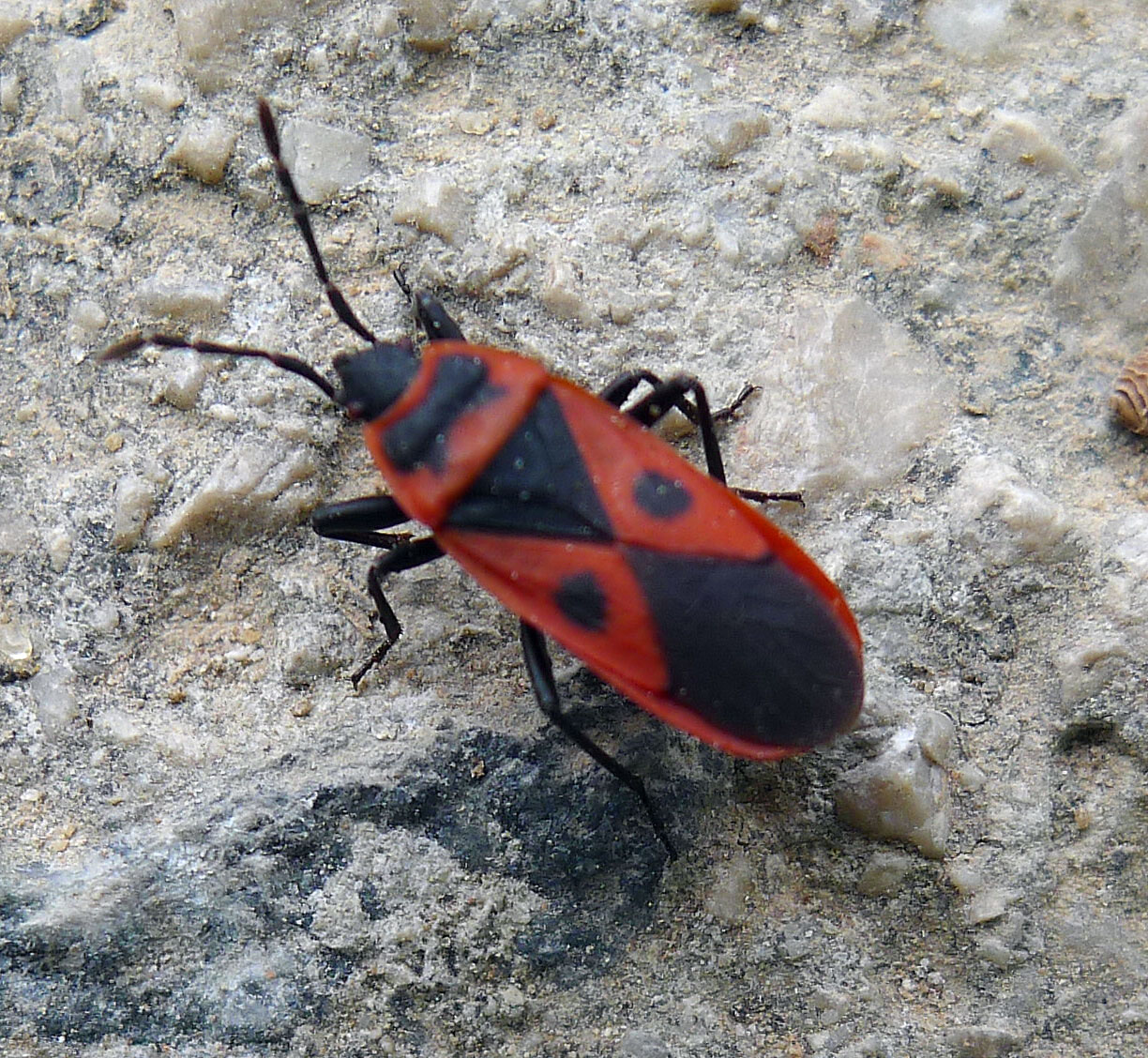
Mediterranean red bug, Scantius aegyptius

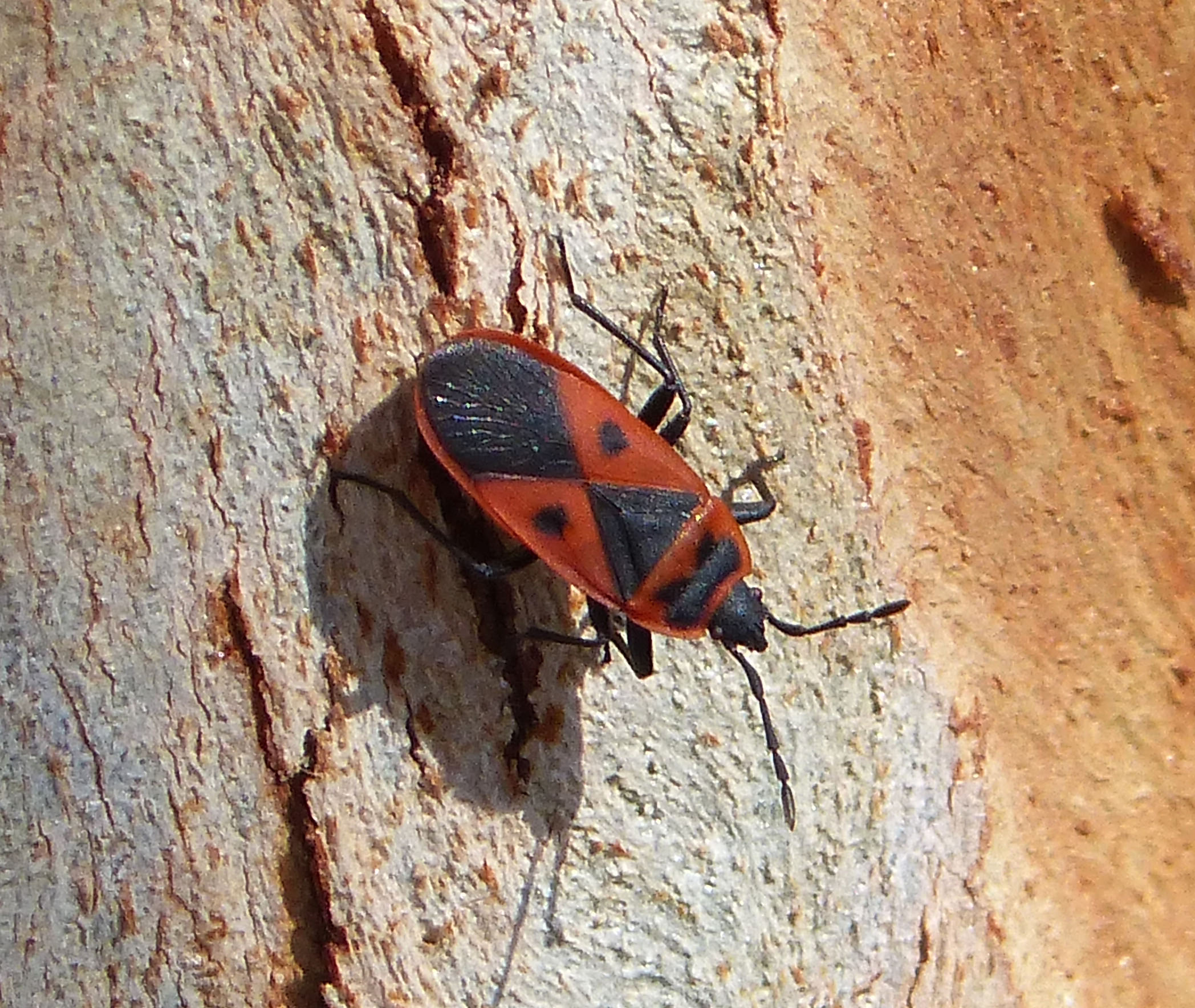
Mediterranean red bug, Scantius aegyptius

Considered an invasive species in North America, it was first recorded in California in 2009. As of 2018, it could be found in most Southern California counties, as well as some in Central California.

== See also ==
- Pyrrhocoris apterus
- Corizus hyoscyami
