= Dysdercus decussatus =

Scientific classification
- Kingdom: Animalia
- Phylum: Arthropoda
- Clade: Pancrustacea
- Class: Insecta
- Order: Hemiptera
- Suborder: Heteroptera
- Family: Pyrrhocoridae
- Genus: Dysdercus
- Species: D. decussatus

Binomial name
- Dysdercus decussatus Boisduval, 1835

Species of insect

Dysdercus decussatus, the fork-banded cotton bug, is a species of true bug in the family Pyrrhocoridae and genus Dysdercus.

== Description ==
Dysdercus decussatus is a medium-sized bug with a body length of 11–16 mm. It features a distinctive red body with black legs and a head that can be either red or black. The forewings display a prominent X-shaped or fork-like white band, which aids in distinguishing it from similar species in the region. Nymphs are characterized by a black head. It is also known regionally as the "Cotton Stained Bug" or "Cotton Striped Bug."

== Range ==
This species is widely distributed across tropical South and Southeast Asia, from Sri Lanka to the Malay Archipelago, as well as New Guinea, northern Australia, and several Pacific islands. It also occurs in adjacent temperate regions such as northern China and Japan. In Taiwan, its distribution is limited to the southern regions and Lanyu Island.

== Habitat ==
Dysdercus decussatus is commonly found in groups under leaves or among the flowers and fruits of host plants such as those in the genera Hibiscus and Thespesia. It prefers tropical and subtropical environments, often associated with coastal or agricultural areas, including cotton fields.

== Ecology ==
The fork-banded cotton bug is phytophagous, feeding primarily on the seeds and sap of malvaceous plants like cotton, hibiscus, and thespesia. It reproduces seasonally, laying eggs on host plants during periods of abundant fruit and seeds, typically in summer months. Adults aggregate without copulation during cooler periods (November to May). It is known as a "cotton stainer" due to its potential to damage cotton bolls by staining them with its feeding and excretion.

== Etymology ==
The specific epithet decussatus derives from the Latin word meaning "crossed" or "intersected," referring to the distinctive X-shaped or fork-like white band on the forewings.

== Taxonomy ==
Dysdercus decussatus was first described by Jean Baptiste Alphonse Déchauffour de Boisduval in 1835, with the type locality in Carteret Islands of Papua New Guinea. It belongs to the subgenus Leptophthalmus within the genus Dysdercus and family Pyrrhocoridae. Several synonyms exist, including Lygaeus cruciatus Montrouzier, 1855, and Dysdercus crucifer Matsumura, 1913 (junior homonym). It can be distinguished from close relatives like Dysdercus cingulatus by head color and wing patterns; nymphs have a black head.
