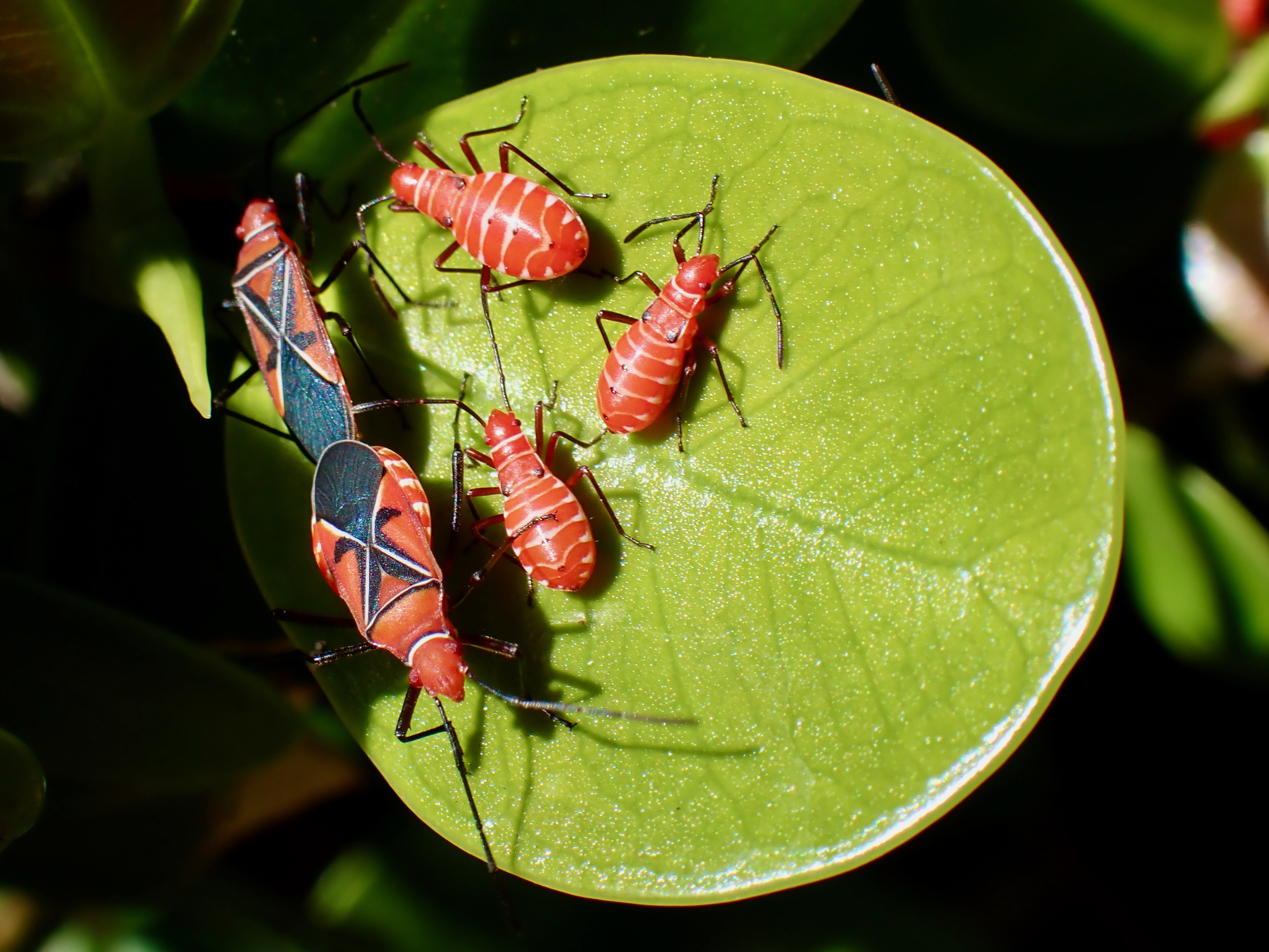
- Two adults (left) and three nymphs (right)

Scientific classification
- Kingdom: Animalia
- Phylum: Arthropoda
- Clade: Pancrustacea
- Class: Insecta
- Order: Hemiptera
- Suborder: Heteroptera
- Family: Pyrrhocoridae
- Genus: Dysdercus
- Species: D. andreae

Binomial name
- Dysdercus andreae (Linnaeus, 1758)

= Dysdercus andreae =

Species of true bug

Dysdercus andreae, or St. Andrew's cotton stainer, is a species of red bug in the family Pyrrhocoridae. It is found on islands in the Caribbean Sea and in North America. The species' common name is in reference to the diagonal white cross seen on it, which resembles the Saint Andrew's Cross.

== Description ==
Females grow to a length of about 8.6-13.6 mm, while males grow to about 7-13 mm. The entire body has a red-orange coloration, with the exception of the head, legs and wings, which are black or dark brown. Each abdominal segment has a band of yellowish-white. Perhaps the most striking feature of the St. Andrew’s cotten stainer is the diagonal cross, which resembles Saint Andrew’s Cross.

== Behavior ==
While they are not strictly a social species, they are able to form groups consisting of hundreds of individuals that poses some degree of coordination.

Its host plant is Thespesia populnea (Pacific rosewoods); this insect feeds on its seeds and fruits. They are a prolific seeder of the plant, spreading the plant.

== Pests ==
It is thought that Dysdercus andreae is a pest for cotton grown in areas such as the West Indies, U.S. Virgin Islands and Leeward islands. It has been suggested that their populations could be managed by destroying old residues of cotton and deploying traps that are baited with cotten seeds, collecting the insects daily. It has also been recommended that they be brushed or picked off the cotton plants and into a bucket of water or kerosene.
