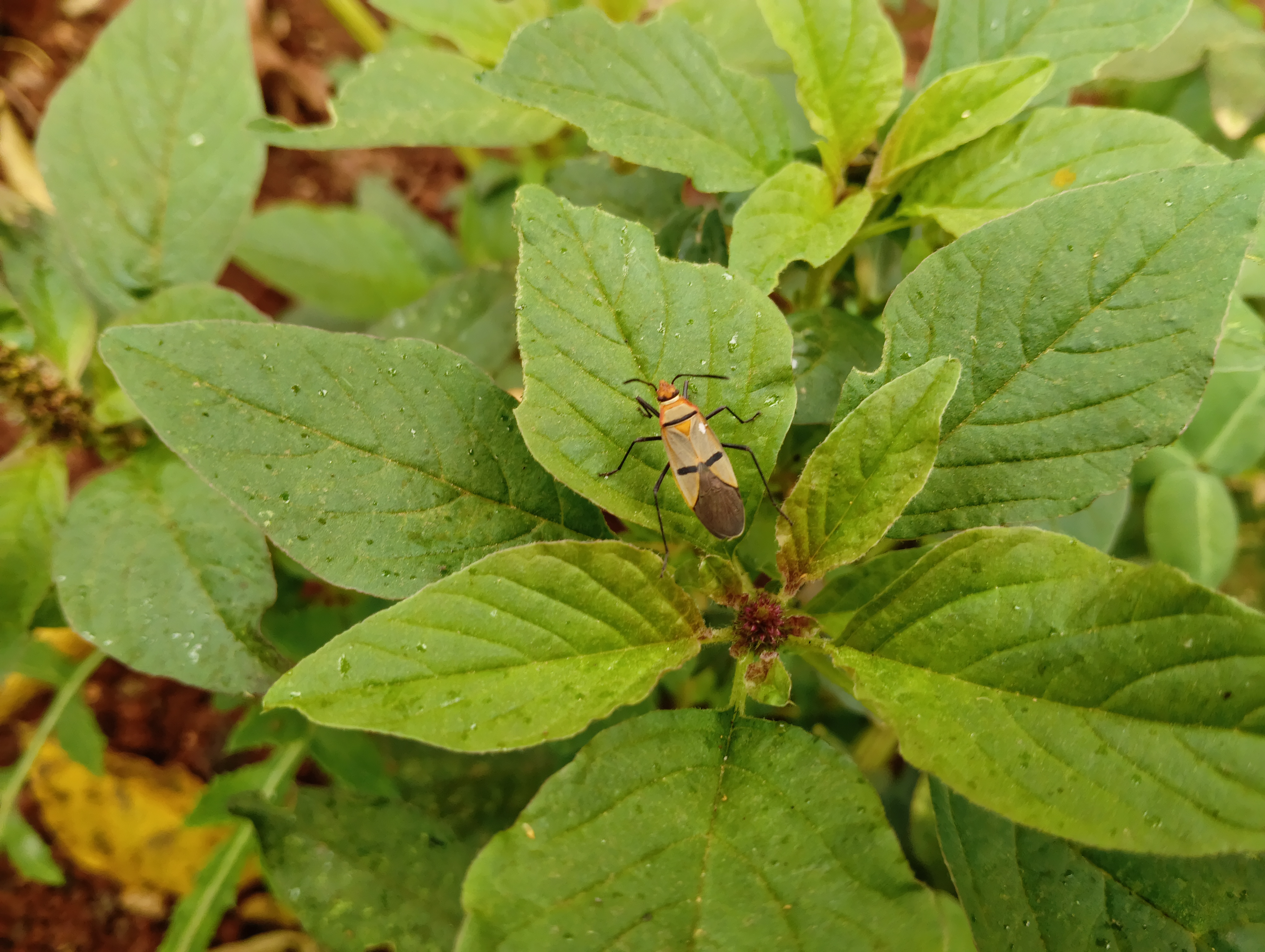

Scientific classification
- Kingdom: Animalia
- Phylum: Arthropoda
- Clade: Pancrustacea
- Class: Insecta
- Order: Hemiptera
- Suborder: Heteroptera
- Family: Pyrrhocoridae
- Genus: Dysdercus
- Species: D. nigrofasciatus

Binomial name
- Dysdercus nigrofasciatus Stål, 1855

= Dysdercus nigrofasciatus =

Species of true bug

Dysdercus nigrofasciatus is a species of true bug in the family Pyrrhocoridae and in the genus Dysdercus, often referred to as "cotton stainers" due to their habit of feeding on cotton and related plants. Commonly known as the African Cotton Stainer. Distributed in the African range, including regions like South Africa, Kenya, Tanzania, and Uganda.
