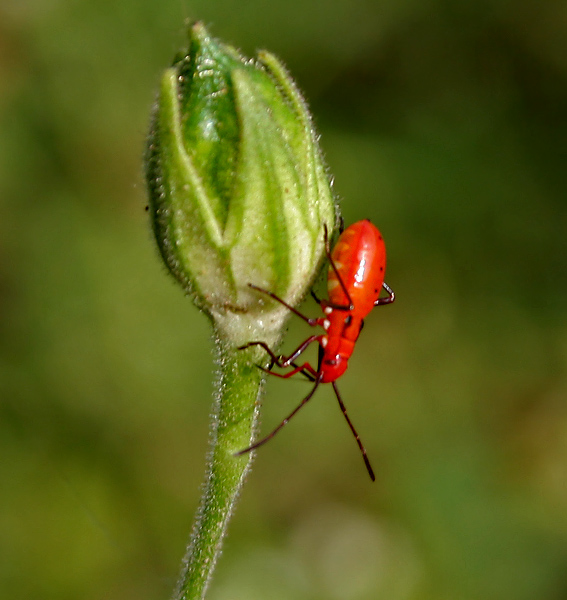
- Nymph on Hibiscus lobatus

Scientific classification
- Domain: Eukaryota
- Kingdom: Animalia
- Phylum: Arthropoda
- Class: Insecta
- Order: Hemiptera
- Suborder: Heteroptera
- Superfamily: Pyrrhocoroidea
- Family: Pyrrhocoridae
- Genus: Dysdercus
- Species: D. koenigii

Binomial name
- Dysdercus koenigii (Fabricius, 1775)

= Dysdercus koenigii =

Species of true bug

Dysdercus koenigii is a species of true bug in the family Pyrrhocoridae, commonly known as the red cotton stainer. It is a serious pest of cotton crops, the adults and older nymphs feeding on the emerging bolls and the cotton seeds as they mature, transmitting cotton staining fungi as they do so.

== Description ==
The nymphs moult five times as they grow. The first and second instar nymphs are orange/red, and the third instar has emerging wingpads and is orange at first, deepening in colour by the second day. The fourth instar is crimson and cylindrical with larger, darker wingpads and the fifth instar is similar, with prominent dark wingpads, black antennae and legs. The adult insect is also crimson, with a pair of black spots on the forewings. The membranous hind wings are concealed under the forewings when the insect is at rest. Males are about 14 mm (0.6 in) in length and females are a little larger.

== Distribution ==
Dysdercus koenigii is commonly found in India, Pakistan and southeastern Asia.

== Host plants ==
The species is a pest of cotton crops, although cotton is not its preferred choice of hosts, as it prefers Alcea rosea and Hibiscus. As each host plant ages and becomes unsuitable, the winged adults migrate to new host plants of the same or different species. While migrating, they often feed on nectar from non-host plants and probe fruits with their rostra (beak-like mouthparts). These fruits are often citrus, perhaps because citrus and cotton are often grown in close proximity.

== Biology ==
The female D. koenigii usually lays three batches of seventy or eighty eggs in damp soil, under plant litter or in crevices. The eggs are oval and creamy-yellow, and take about six days to hatch. The nymphs pass through five instar stages and become winged adults after fifty to sixty days. The adults survive for a few weeks and there are several generations throughout the year. The adults and later stage instars feed on immature cotton bolls and on the developing and ripening seed. By their presence in the bolls, they admit fungi such as Eremothecium gossypii which indelibly stains the lint.
