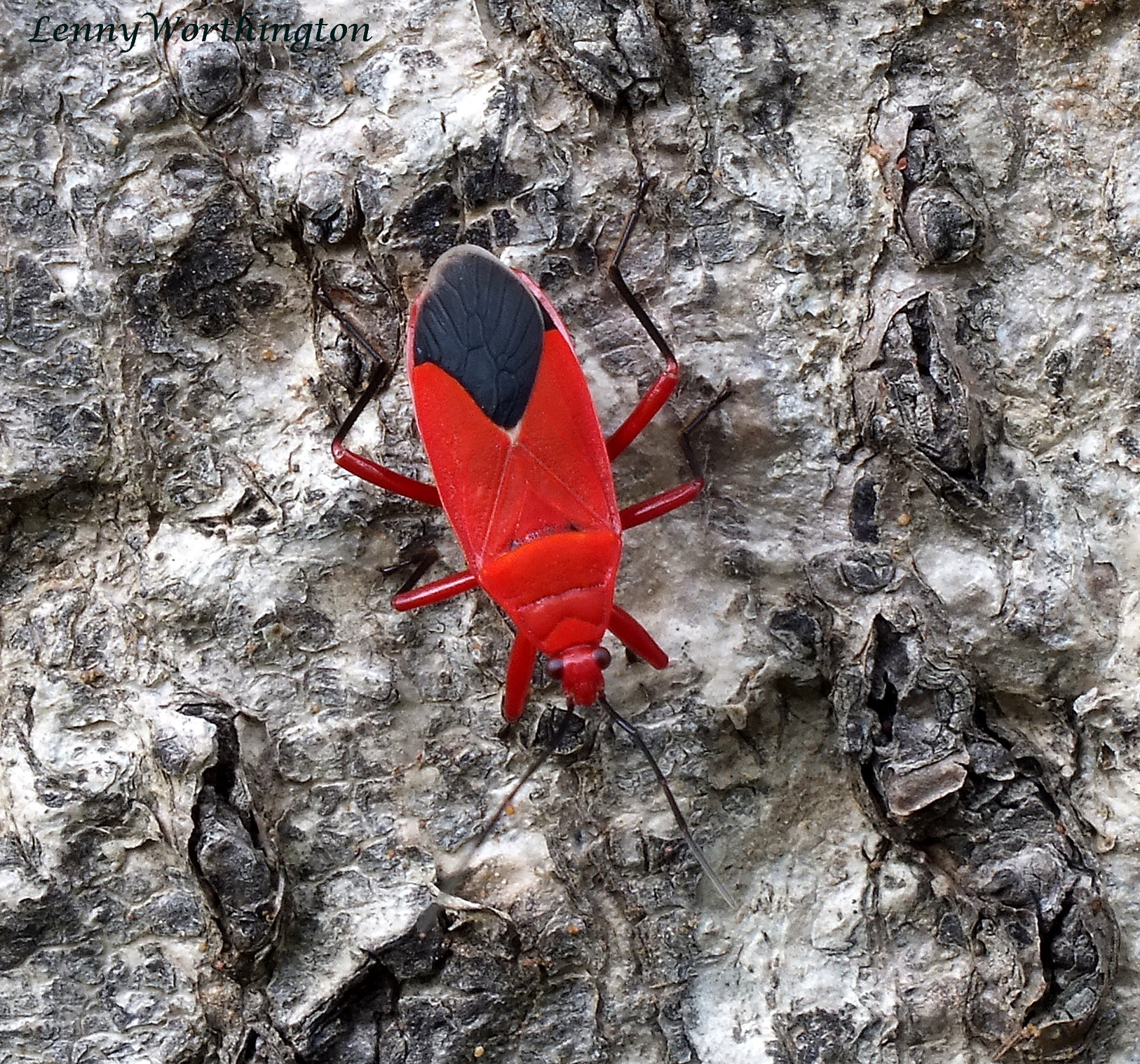

Scientific classification
- Kingdom: Animalia
- Phylum: Arthropoda
- Class: Insecta
- Order: Hemiptera
- Suborder: Heteroptera
- Family: Pyrrhocoridae
- Genus: Antilochus
- Species: A. coquebertii

Binomial name
- Antilochus coquebertii (Fabricius, 1803)

Synonyms
- Lygaeus coquebertii Fabricius, 1803; Antilochus coqueberti (Fabricius, 1803) (Missp.)

= Antilochus coquebertii =

Species of true bug

Antilochus coquebertii (often misspelled as coqueberti) is an Old World species of true bug in the family Pyrrhocoridae, occurring in South and Southeast Asia. It is brightly coloured, red and black, and is a beneficial predator on other pyrrhocorids, especially the genus Dysdercus, which are crop pests. They are often confused with bugs in the family Lygaeidae, but can be distinguished by the lack of ocelli on the head, and they can be easily distinguished from Dysdercus by the lack of white stripes on the body. They are known to be cannibalistic in nature.
