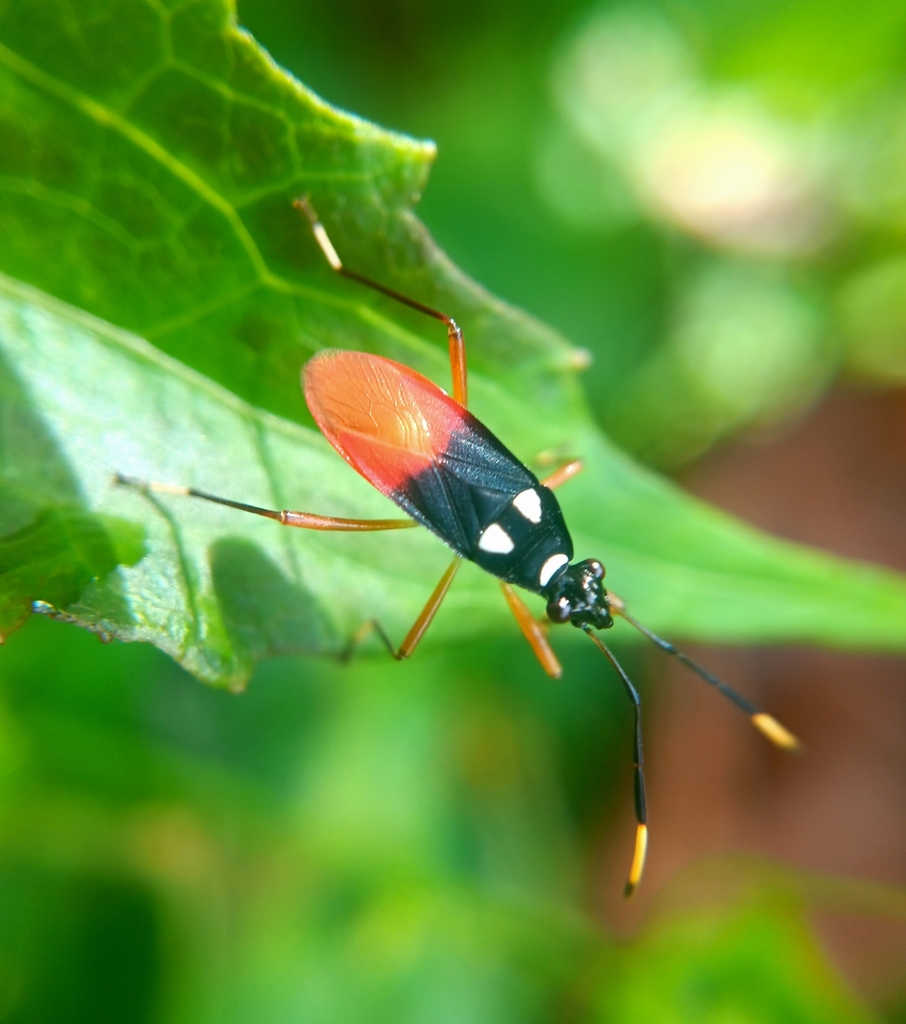
- On a leaf

Scientific classification
- Kingdom: Animalia
- Phylum: Arthropoda
- Clade: Pancrustacea
- Class: Insecta
- Order: Hemiptera
- Suborder: Heteroptera
- Family: Pyrrhocoridae
- Genus: Dindymus
- Species: D. albicornis

Binomial name
- Dindymus albicornis (Fabricius, 1803)

= Dindymus albicornis =

Species of insect

Dindymus albicornis is a bug in the genus Dindymus native to Asia, but mostly seen in the Philippines.

== Appearance ==
This species appears as a shield bug, with an orange bottom, a big black stripe, a black joiner with two white quarter ovals and a small white oval. the head is round and the antennae are black with yellow tips.
