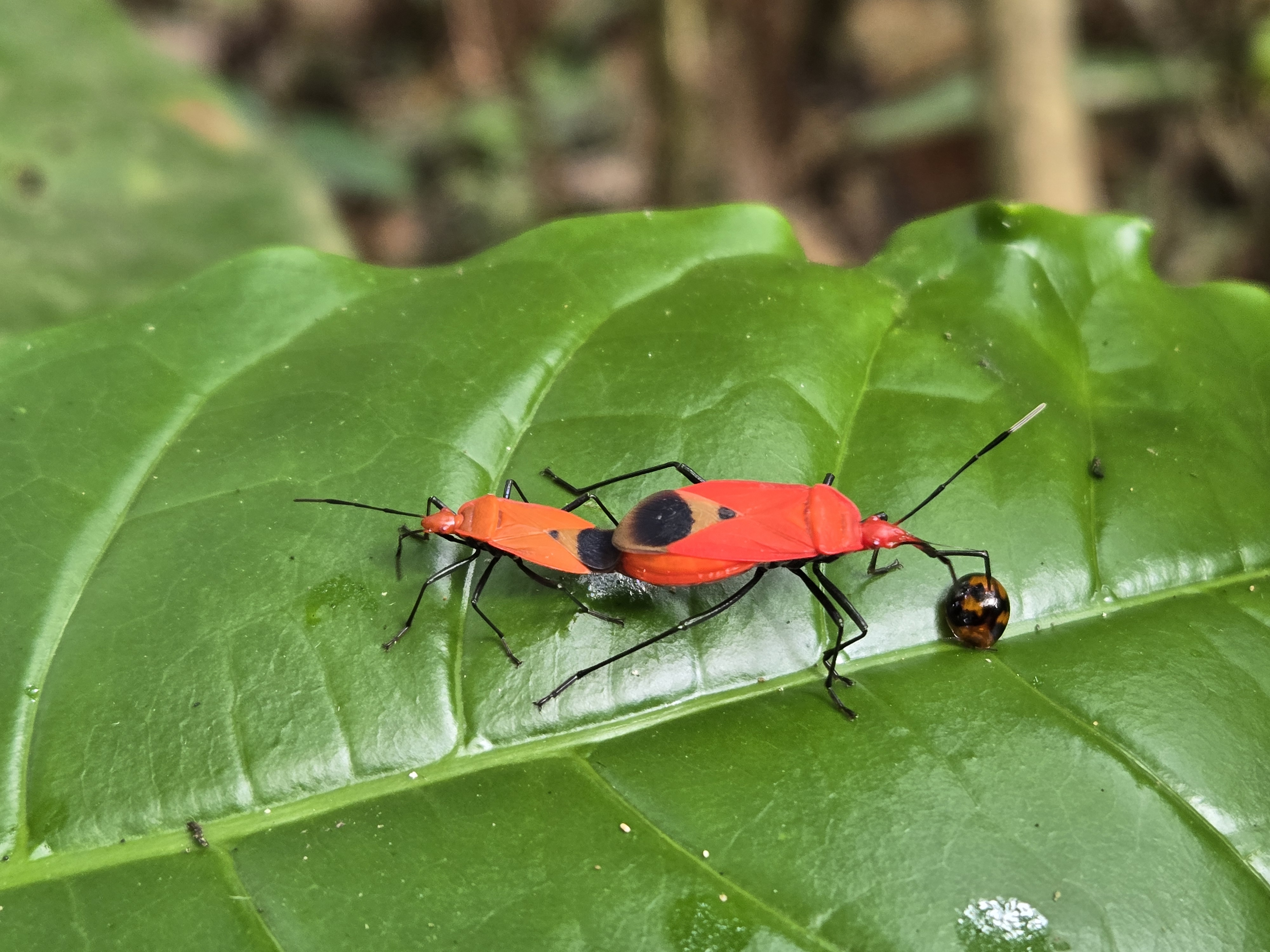

Scientific classification
- Kingdom: Animalia
- Phylum: Arthropoda
- Clade: Pancrustacea
- Class: Insecta
- Order: Hemiptera
- Suborder: Heteroptera
- Family: Pyrrhocoridae
- Genus: Dindymus
- Species: D. bifurcatus

Binomial name
- Dindymus bifurcatus Stehlík & Jindra, 2006

= Dindymus bifurcatus =

Species of insect

Dindymus bifurcatus is a predatory bug in the family Pyrrhocoridae. It is found from India to Malaysia. They are red and black with some amount of colour variation. The body is mostly red and there is a black spot at the base of the membrane of the forewing which may sometimes be absent. The labium, antennae, legs and sometimes the mesoscutum are black. The underside is black. The membrane is sometimes black towards except at the base. The base of the first segment of the antenna is sometimes reddish and the distal parts of the femora can also be red but is usually black. The distinctive feature is the male genital capsule which has a bifurcate shape.
