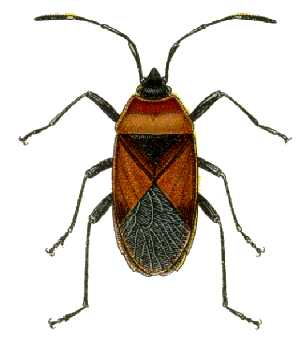

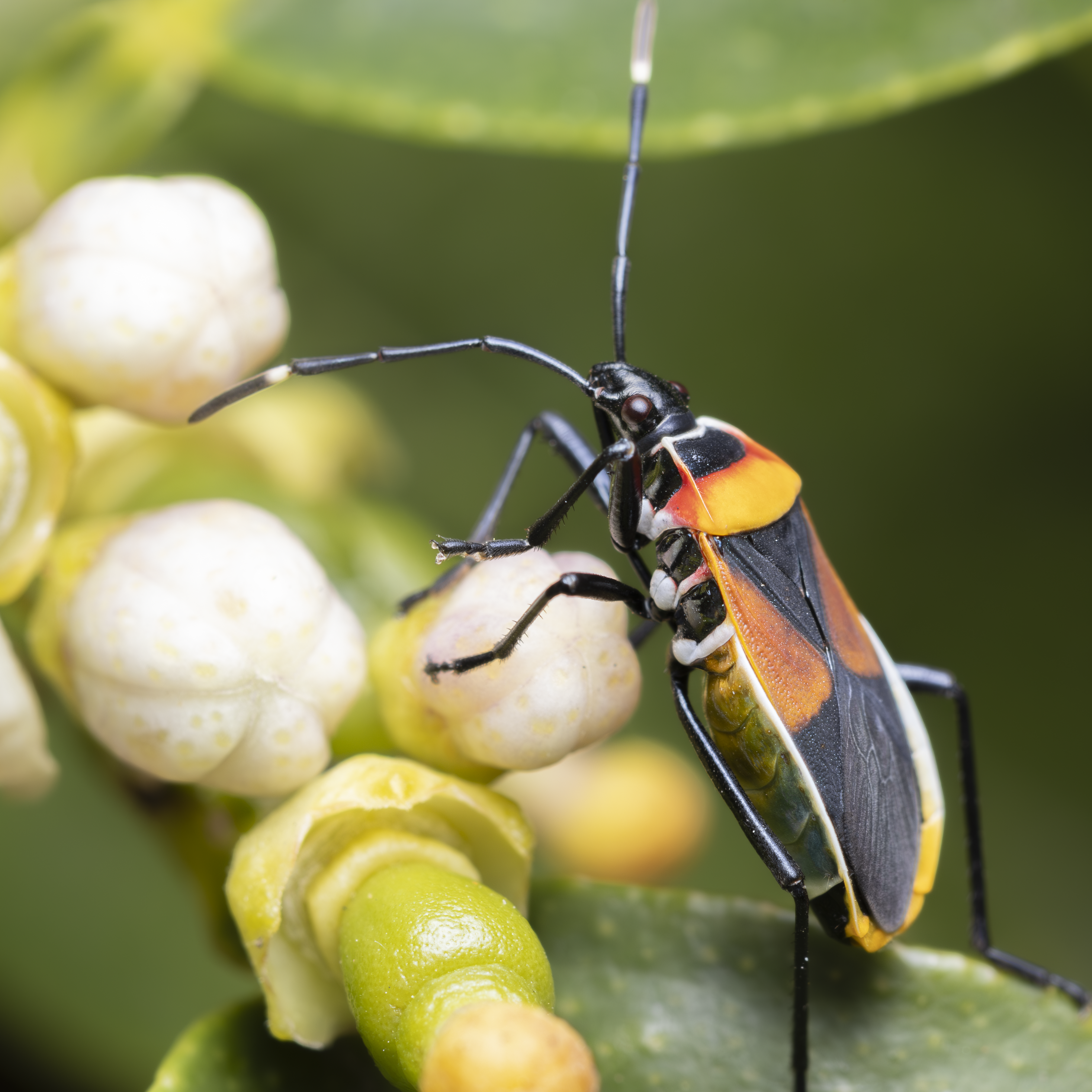
- A Dindymus versicolor in Victoria, Australia

Scientific classification
- Kingdom: Animalia
- Phylum: Arthropoda
- Clade: Pancrustacea
- Class: Insecta
- Order: Hemiptera
- Suborder: Heteroptera
- Family: Pyrrhocoridae
- Genus: Dindymus
- Species: D. versicolor

Binomial name
- Dindymus versicolor (Herrich-Schaeffer, 1853)

Synonyms
- Odontopus versicolor Herrich-Schaeffer, 1853

= Dindymus versicolor =

Species of true bug

Dindymus versicolor, commonly called the harlequin bug or harlequin red bug, is a species of cotton stainer bug (red bug), found in south-eastern Australia and Tasmania. Dindymus versicolor measure up to 12 mm long with a black head and bands on the fore-wing, and orange/red elsewhere. When the wings are folded, two red triangles appear. Legs are relatively long.

These sucking insects have a reputation as a pest in the garden, damaging a wide range of plants. They are known to damage a variety of crops and ornamentals. The New South Wales Department of Primary Industries (Agriculture) report they attack cotton, pome fruits, stone fruits, fig, grape, kurrajong, strawberry, vegetables, wisteria, dahlia and violets.

In winter, they find shelter in dark shady places such as under compost, timber, hedges, and fence palings.
