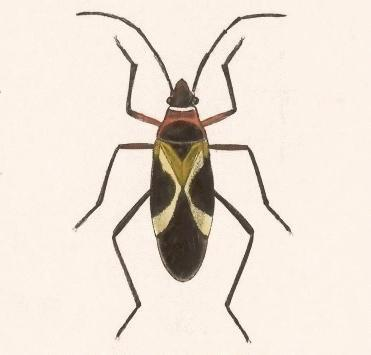

Scientific classification
- Kingdom: Animalia
- Phylum: Arthropoda
- Clade: Pancrustacea
- Class: Insecta
- Order: Hemiptera
- Suborder: Heteroptera
- Family: Pyrrhocoridae
- Genus: Dysdercus
- Species: D. concinnus

Binomial name
- Dysdercus concinnus Stål, 1861

= Dysdercus concinnus =

Species of true bug

Dysdercus concinnus, known generally as the pale red bug or Turk's cap red bug, is a species of red bug in the family Pyrrhocoridae. It is found in Central America, North America, and South America.

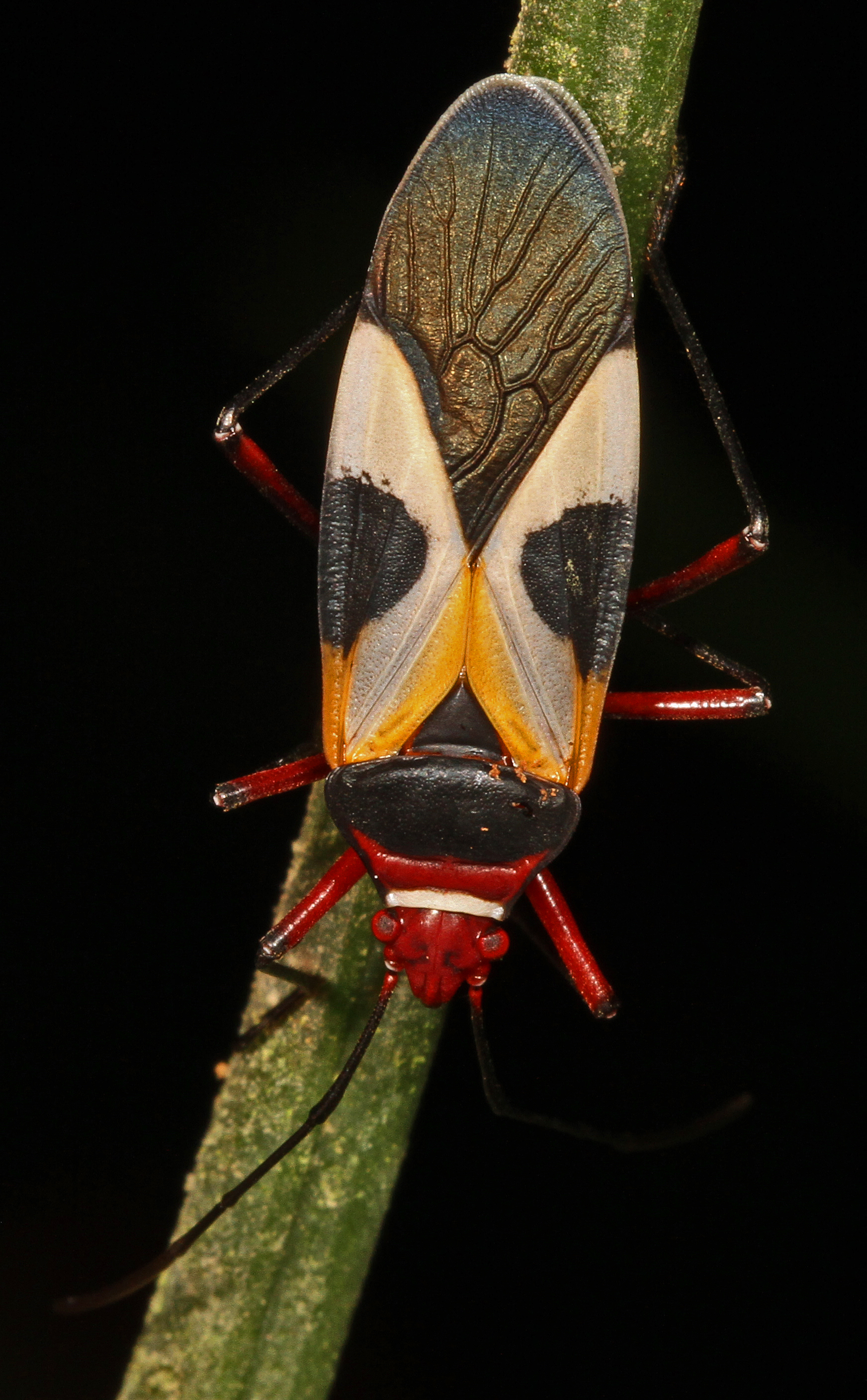
Pale red bug, Dysdercus concinnus
