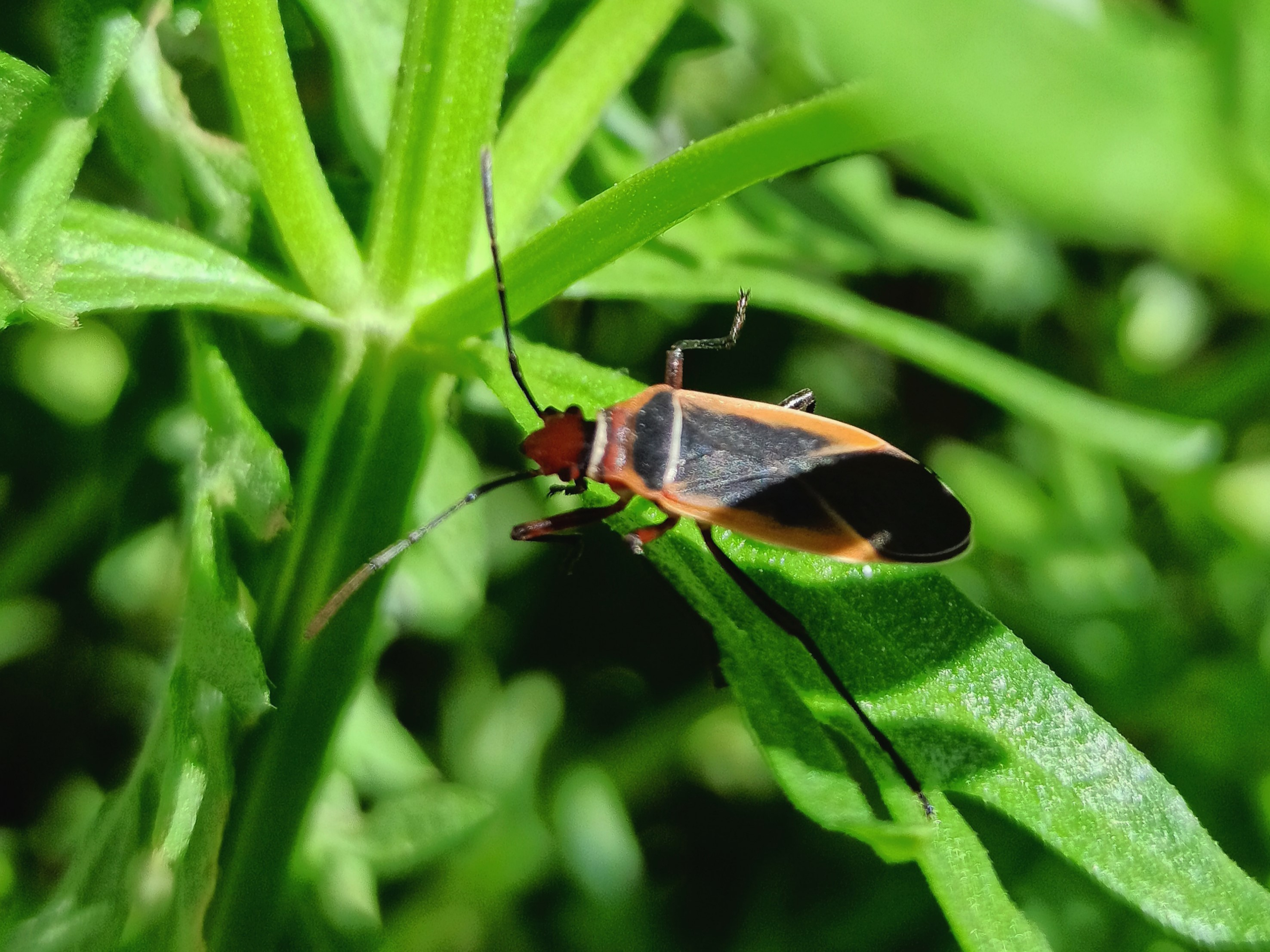

Scientific classification
- Domain: Eukaryota
- Kingdom: Animalia
- Phylum: Arthropoda
- Class: Insecta
- Order: Hemiptera
- Suborder: Heteroptera
- Family: Pyrrhocoridae
- Genus: Dysdercus
- Species: D. mimulus

Binomial name
- Dysdercus mimulus Hussey, 1929

= Dysdercus mimulus =

Species of true bug

Dysdercus mimulus is a species of red bug in the family Pyrrhocoridae. It is found in the Caribbean, Central America, and North America.

== Subspecies ==
These two subspecies belong to the species Dysdercus mimulus:

- Dysdercus mimulus luteus Doesburg, 1968
- Dysdercus mimulus mimulus Hussey, 1929
