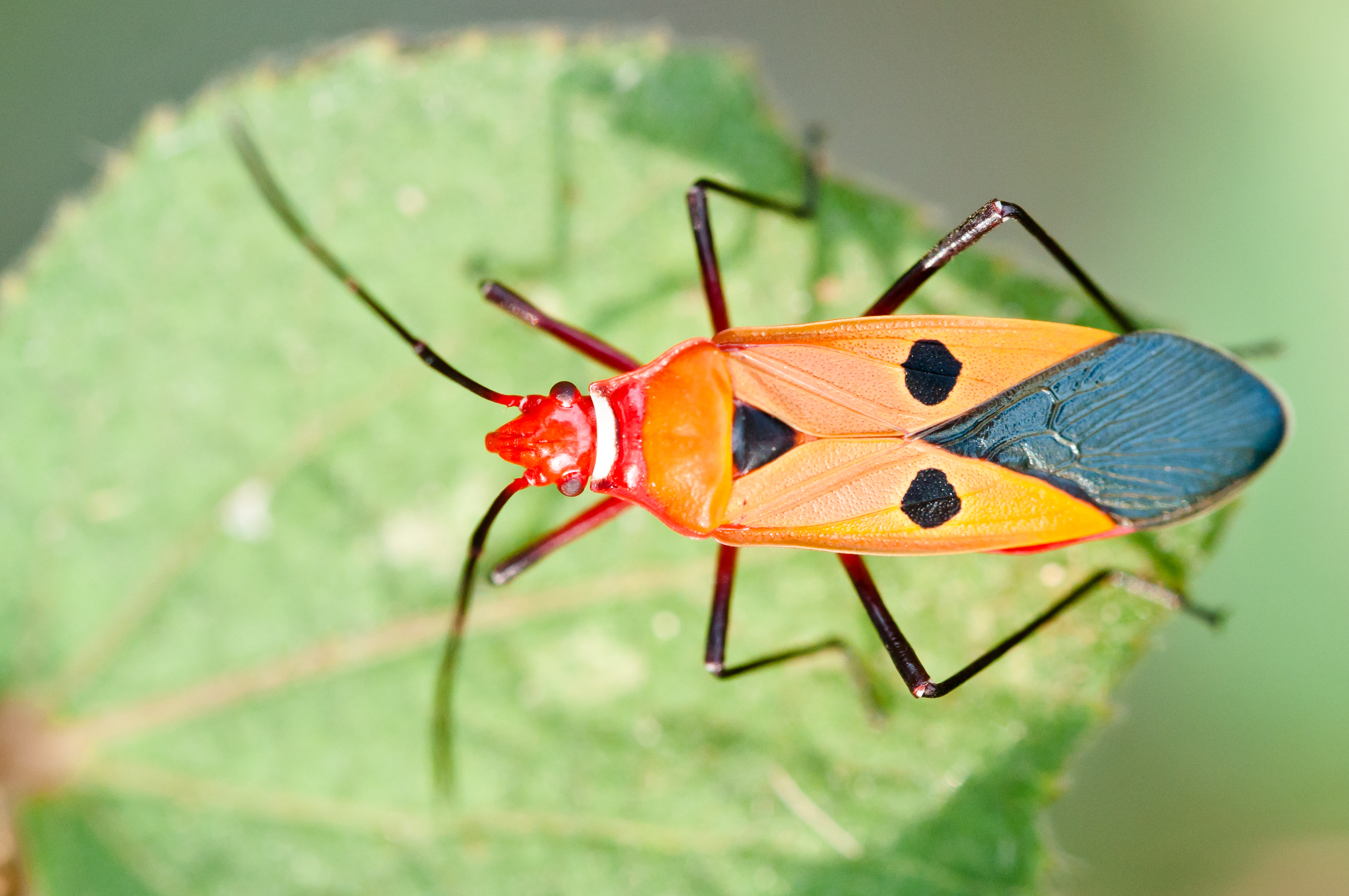

Scientific classification
- Kingdom: Animalia
- Phylum: Arthropoda
- Class: Insecta
- Order: Hemiptera
- Suborder: Heteroptera
- Family: Pyrrhocoridae
- Genus: Dysdercus
- Species: D. cingulatus

Binomial name
- Dysdercus cingulatus (Fabricius, 1775)

= Dysdercus cingulatus =

Insect species

Dysdercus cingulatus is a species of true bug in the family Pyrrhocoridae, commonly known as the red cotton stainer. It is a serious pest of cotton crops, the adults and older nymphs feeding on the emerging bolls and the cotton seeds as they mature, transmitting cotton-staining fungi as they do so.

== Description ==
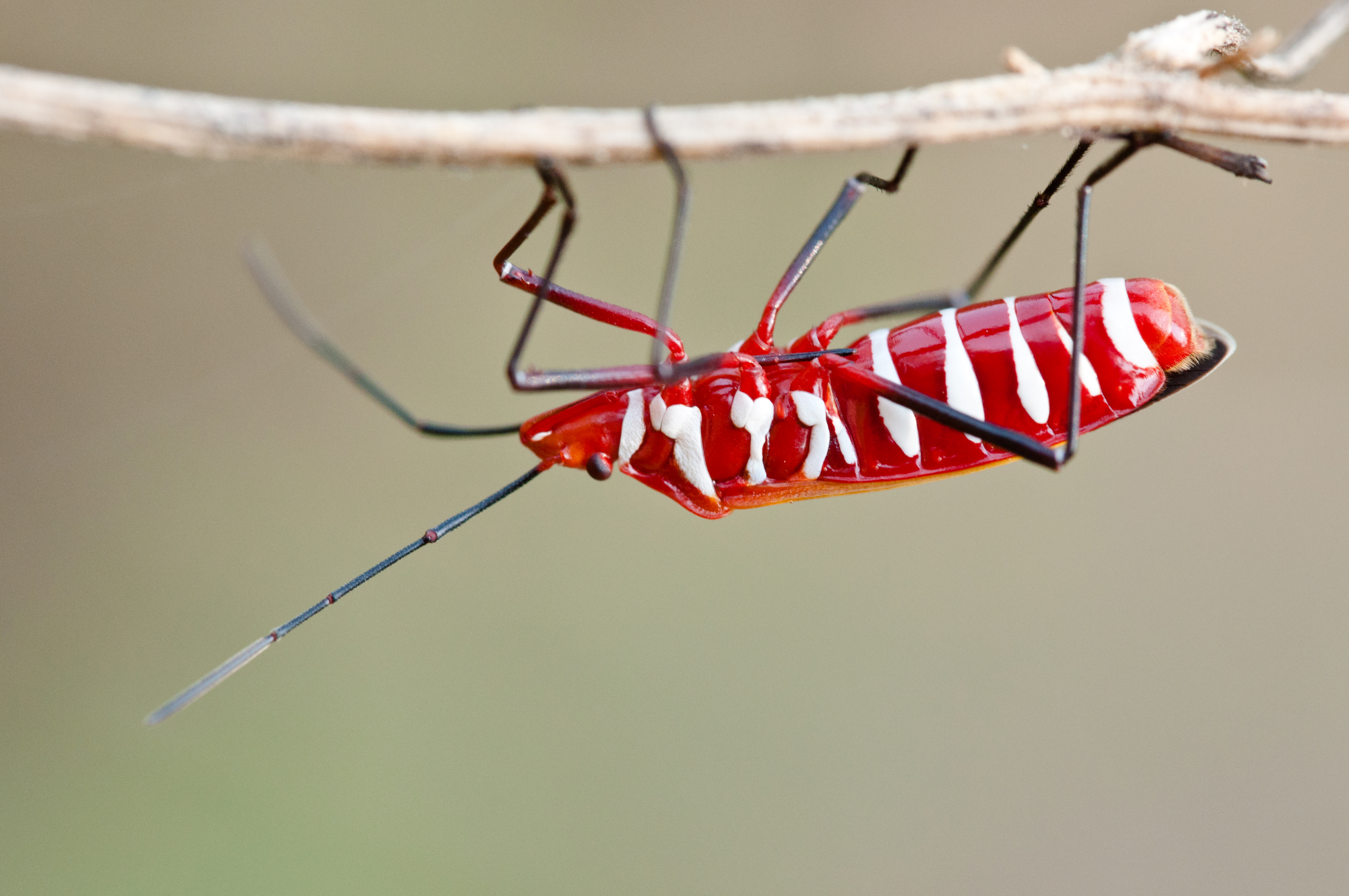
D. cingulatus, Kaeng Krachan National Park, Thailand

Dysdercus cingulatus grows to a length of 12 to 18 mm (0.47 to 0.71 in). It is mainly red but has a white collar and black hemelytral spots. It is closely related and very similar to Dysdercus koenigii but D. cingulatus is slightly larger and the femora have varying amounts of black while D. koenigii has completely red femora.

== Distribution ==
D. cingulatus is reported to occur in Sumatra, Borneo, the Philippines, Sri Lanka, northern India, western Pakistan, Bangladesh, Cambodia, Thailand, Papua New Guinea, and northern Australia. The exact distribution is difficult to ascertain because of historical confusion between this species and D. koenigii.

== Host plants ==
As well as cotton (Gossypium), D. cingulatus feeds on a number of other crop plants including okra (Abelmoschus esculentus), muskmallow (Abelmoschus moschatus), hibiscus, white jute (Corchorus capsularis), citrus and maize (Zea mays). It also attacks trees including silk cotton tree (Bombax ceiba), kapok (Ceiba pentandra), teak (Tectona grandis) and the portia tree (Thespesia populnea).

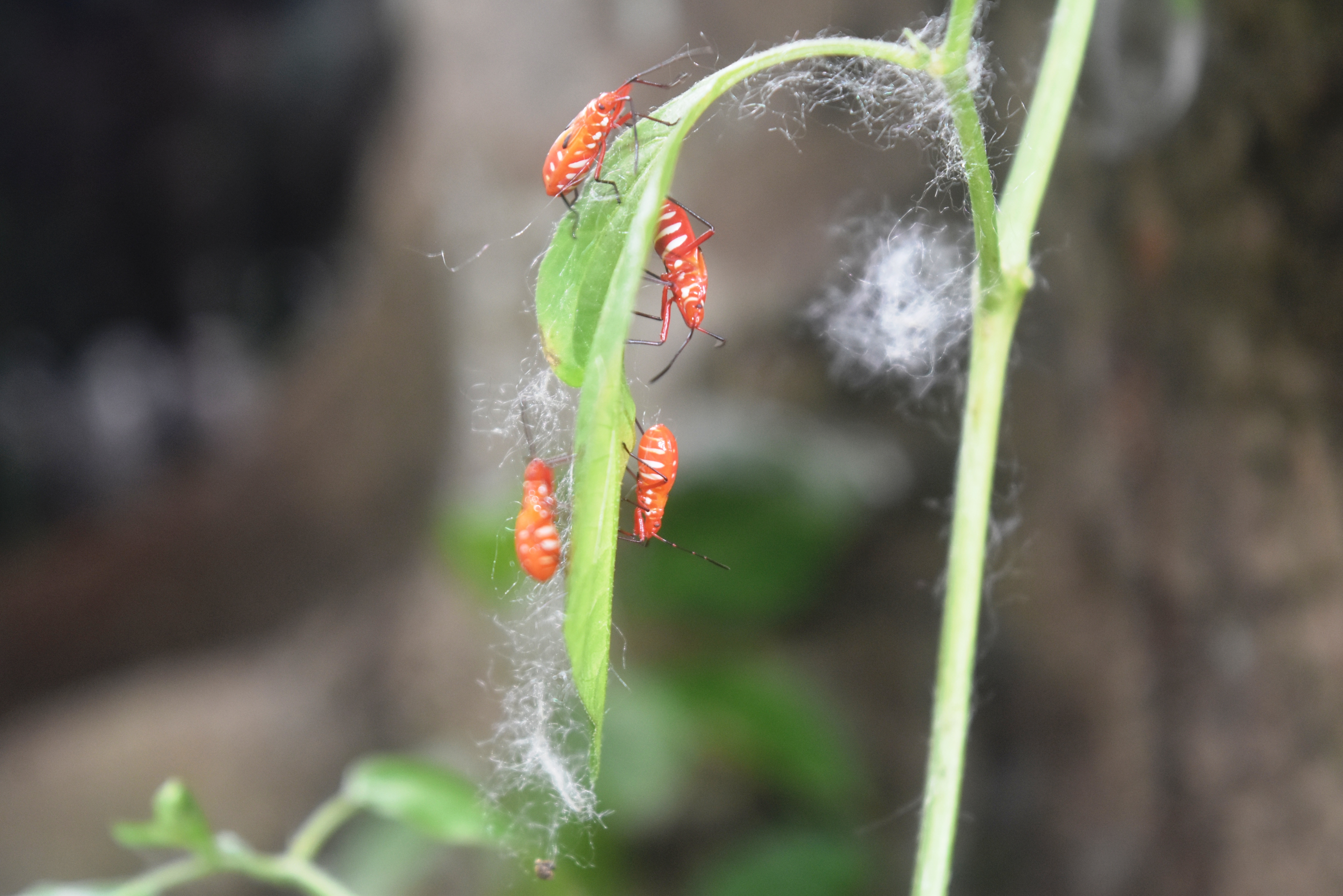
Cotton bugs in Pili, Camarines Sur, Philippines

== Biology ==
Like other true bugs, Dysdercus cingulatus sucks fluids from its host plants. The only part of the cotton plant affected by this pest is the flower and the seed capsule or boll. As this develops, the insect thrusts its rostrum between the carpels and sucks fluids from the still soft seeds inside. Micro-organisms are admitted in the process and may make the boll contents rot or the lint become discoloured. Meanwhile, the seeds wither, the fibres may fail to expand and the boll may abort. When the seeds of a host plant ripen and it becomes unsuitable, the adult insects migrate to new host plants of the same or different species. While away from their hosts, they feed on nectar and fruit of non-host plants, and can survive for several days without food. They seem fond of citrus fruits, but this may merely be because there are often citrus plantations near to cotton fields.

Adult females lay several batches, each of sixty to ninety eggs, in chambers they dig in the soil. These hatch after about five days and the nymphs develop through four nymphal stages over a period of thirty to forty or more days before becoming mature.
