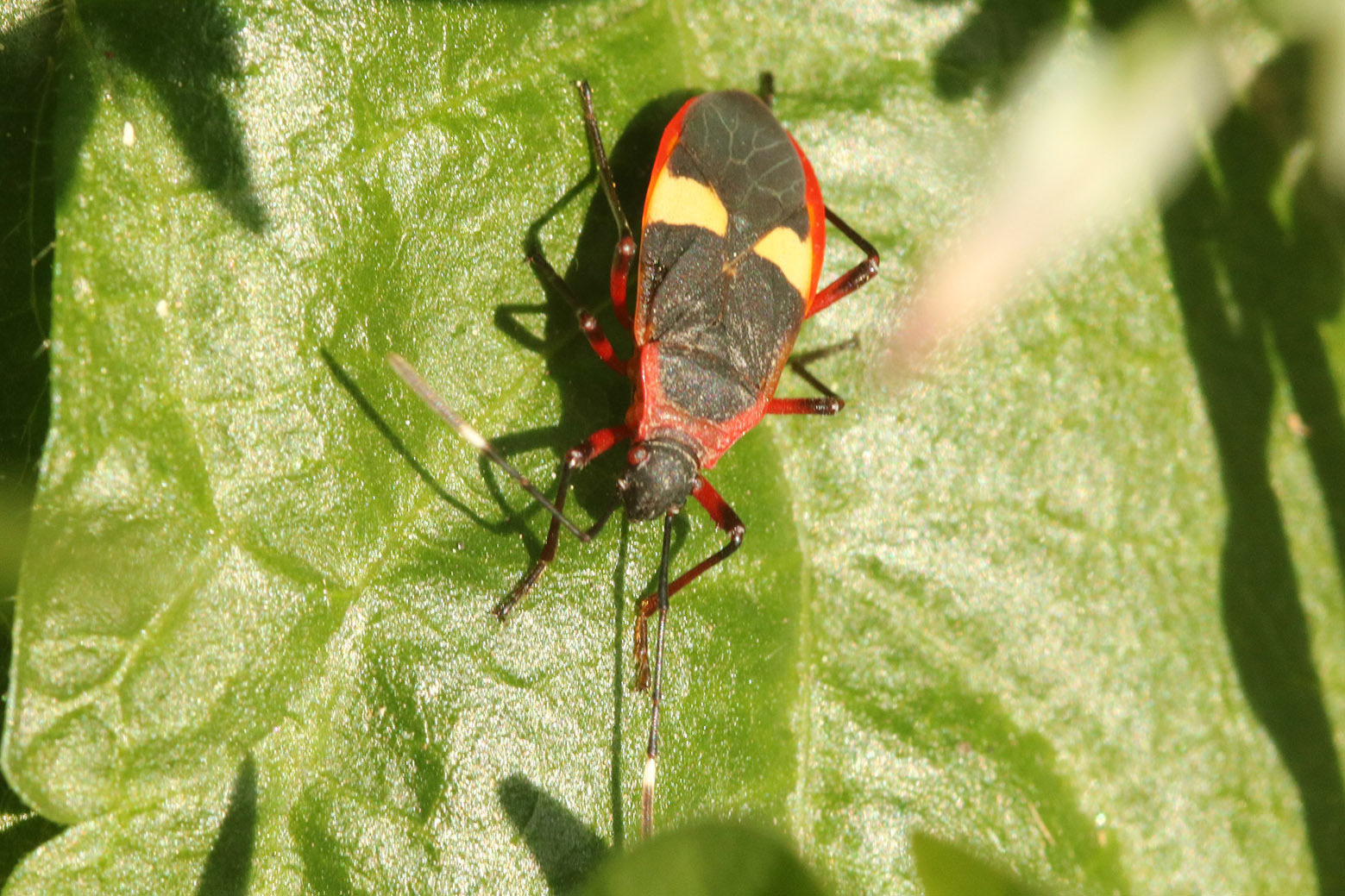

Scientific classification
- Domain: Eukaryota
- Kingdom: Animalia
- Phylum: Arthropoda
- Class: Insecta
- Order: Hemiptera
- Suborder: Heteroptera
- Family: Pyrrhocoridae
- Genus: Dysdercus
- Species: D. albofasciatus

Binomial name
- Dysdercus albofasciatus Berg, 1878

Synonyms
- Dysdercus ruficollis Berg 1878 (Preocc.)

= Dysdercus albofasciatus =

Species of true bug

Dysdercus albofasciatus is a species of true bug in the family Pyrrhocoridae. It is found in Argentina, Brazil, Paraguay, and Uruguay.
