= Dysdercus bimaculatus =

Scientific classification
- Kingdom: Animalia
- Phylum: Arthropoda
- Clade: Pancrustacea
- Class: Insecta
- Order: Hemiptera
- Suborder: Heteroptera
- Family: Pyrrhocoridae
- Genus: Dysdercus
- Species: D. bimaculatus

Binomial name
- Dysdercus bimaculatus (Stål, 1854)

Species of true bug

Dysdercus bimaculatus, the two-spotted cotton stainer, is a species of red bug in the family Pyrrhocoridae. It is found in North America, and South America.
