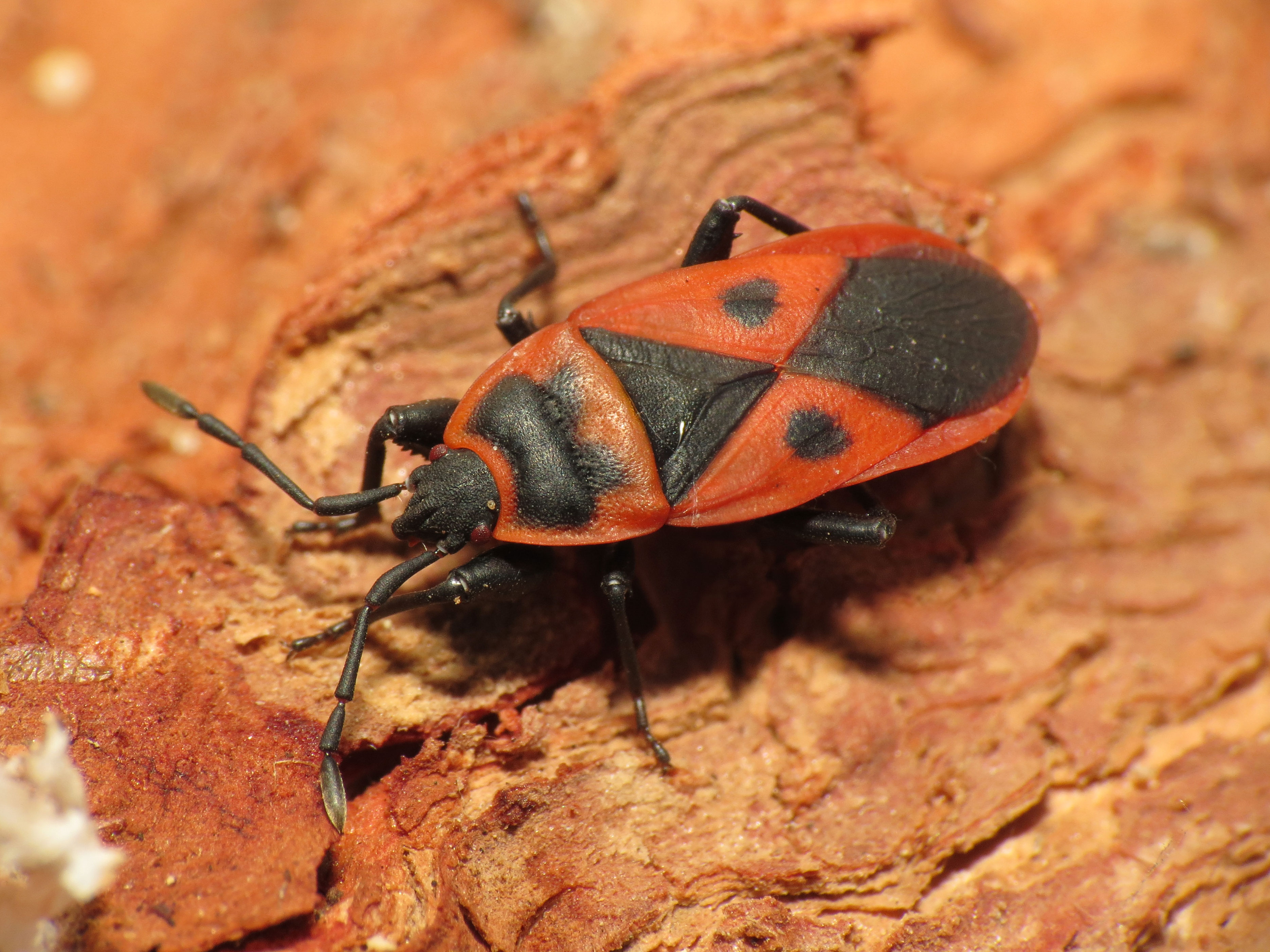
- Scantius aegyptius

Scientific classification
- Kingdom: Animalia
- Phylum: Arthropoda
- Clade: Pancrustacea
- Class: Insecta
- Order: Hemiptera
- Suborder: Heteroptera
- Family: Pyrrhocoridae
- Genus: Scantius; Stål, 1866

= Scantius =

Genus of true bugs

Scantius is a genus of mostly African and European bugs in the family Pyrrhocoridae. There are at least two described species in Scantius.

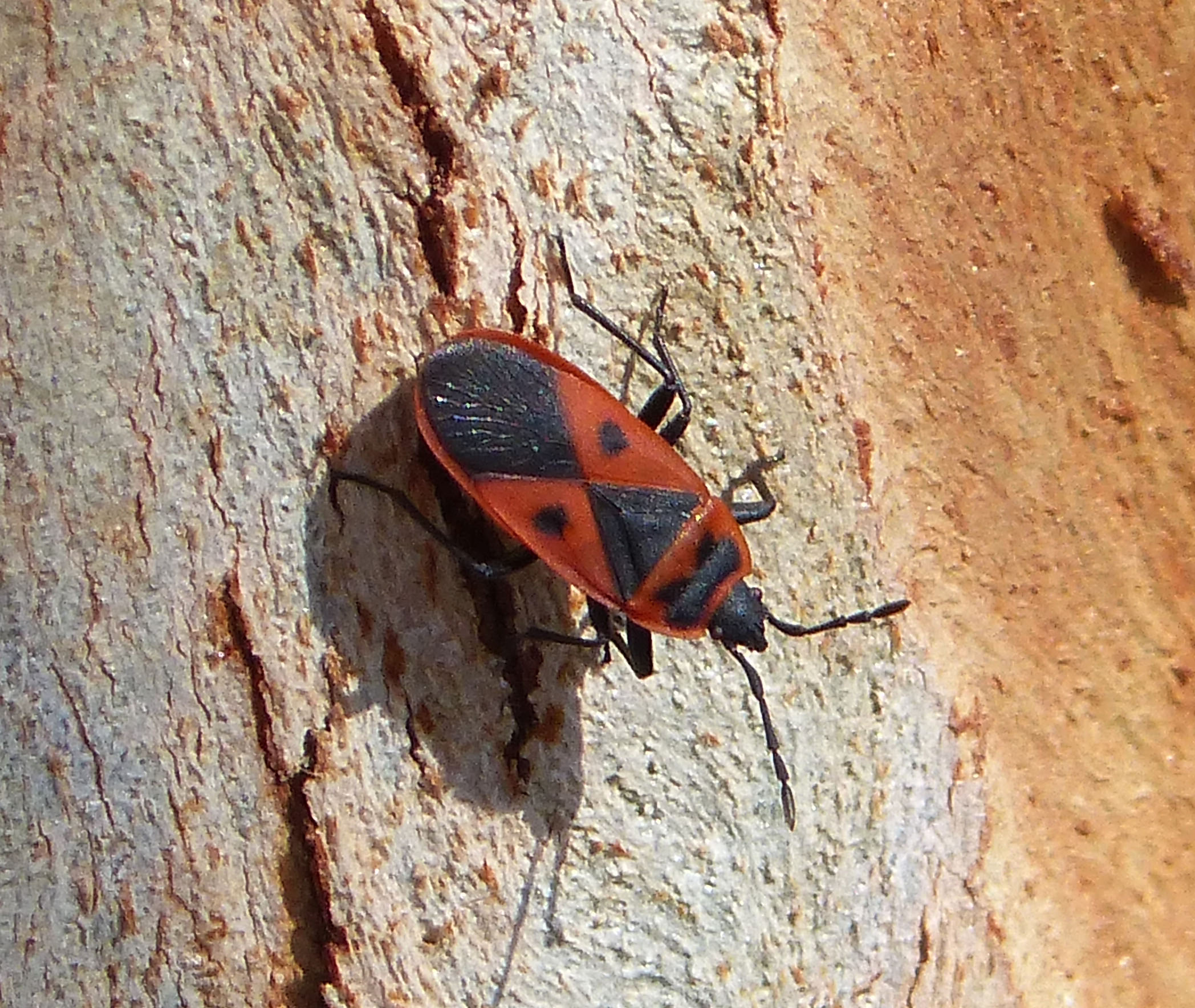
Scantius aegyptius

== Species ==
These species belong to the genus Scantius:

- Scantius aegyptius (Linnaeus, 1758)^{g b} (Mediterranean red bug)
- Scantius forsteri (Fabricius, 1781)^{g}

Data sources: i = ITIS, c = Catalogue of Life, g = GBIF, b = Bugguide.net
