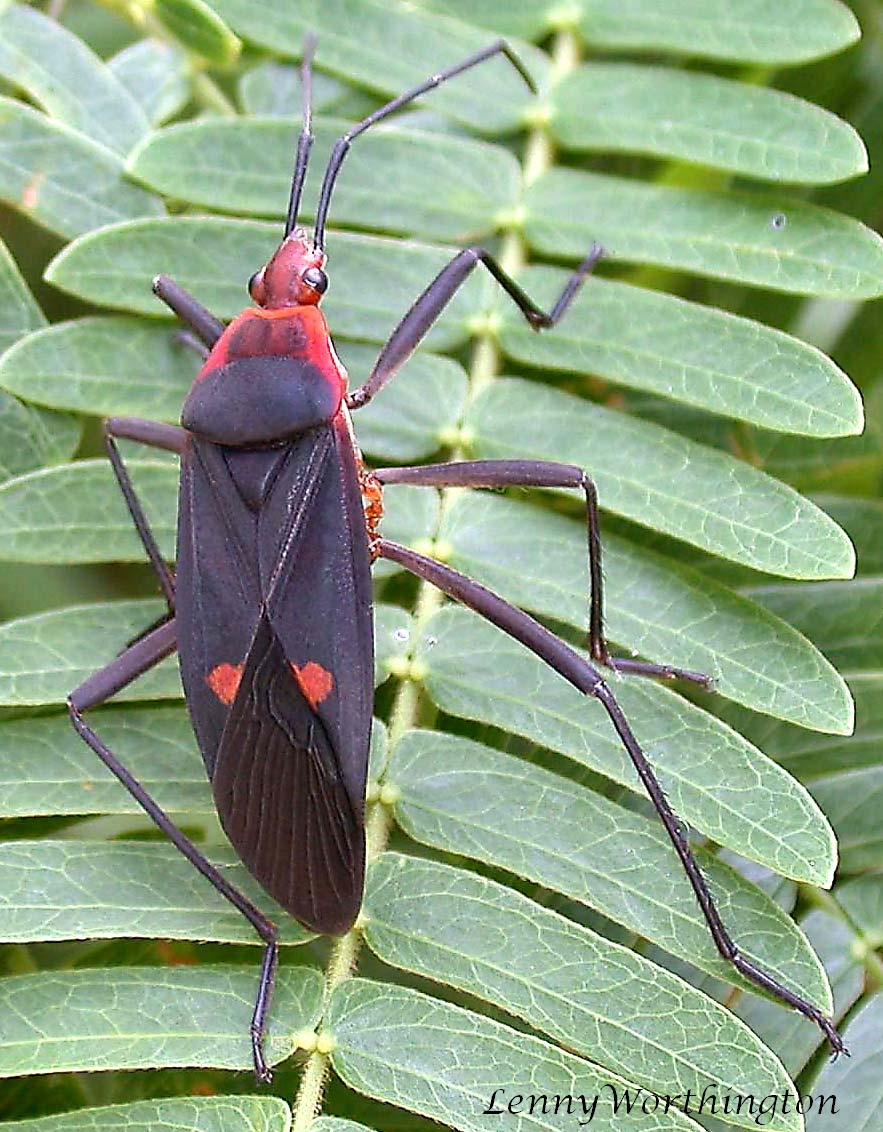
- Melamphaus faber

Scientific classification
- Kingdom: Animalia
- Phylum: Arthropoda
- Class: Insecta
- Order: Hemiptera
- Suborder: Heteroptera
- Family: Pyrrhocoridae
- Genus: Melamphaus; Stål, 1868

Type species
- Melamphaus faber

Species
- See text

= Melamphaus =

Genus of true bugs

Melamphaus is an Old World genus of true bugs in the family Pyrrhocoridae, mostly found in Asia. They are often confused with bugs in the family Lygaeidae, but can be distinguished by the lack of ocelli on the head.

== Description ==
The genus has adults with large and characteristic oval shape and the body is densely covered in short hair. The head behind the eye narrows slightly and the eyes are at a distance from the fore edge of the pronotum. The edge of the pronotum is not extended to the sides or bent down. The metathoracic scent gland has an ostiole with a peritreme and a deep furrow. The sutures on the underside of the abdominal segments between 4 and 5; and between 5 and 6 are strongly curved forwards.

Many species may swarm seasonally on seeds of specific trees. Melamphaus faber is known to be found in large numbers on Hydnocarpus castaneus [as H. anthelmetica] and H. wightiana in Singapore. In Indonesia, Melamphaus faber have a specialist predator: Raxa nishidai.

== Species ==
William Lucas Distant originally included only 2 species in this genus:

- Melamphaus agnatus (Bergroth, 1894)
- Melamphaus faber (Fabricius, 1787)
- Melamphaus fulvomarginatus (Dohrn, 1860)
- Melamphaus komodoensis (Kirichenko, 1963)
- Melamphaus rubrocinctus (Stål, 1863)
- Melamphaus vicinus (Schmidt, 1932)
