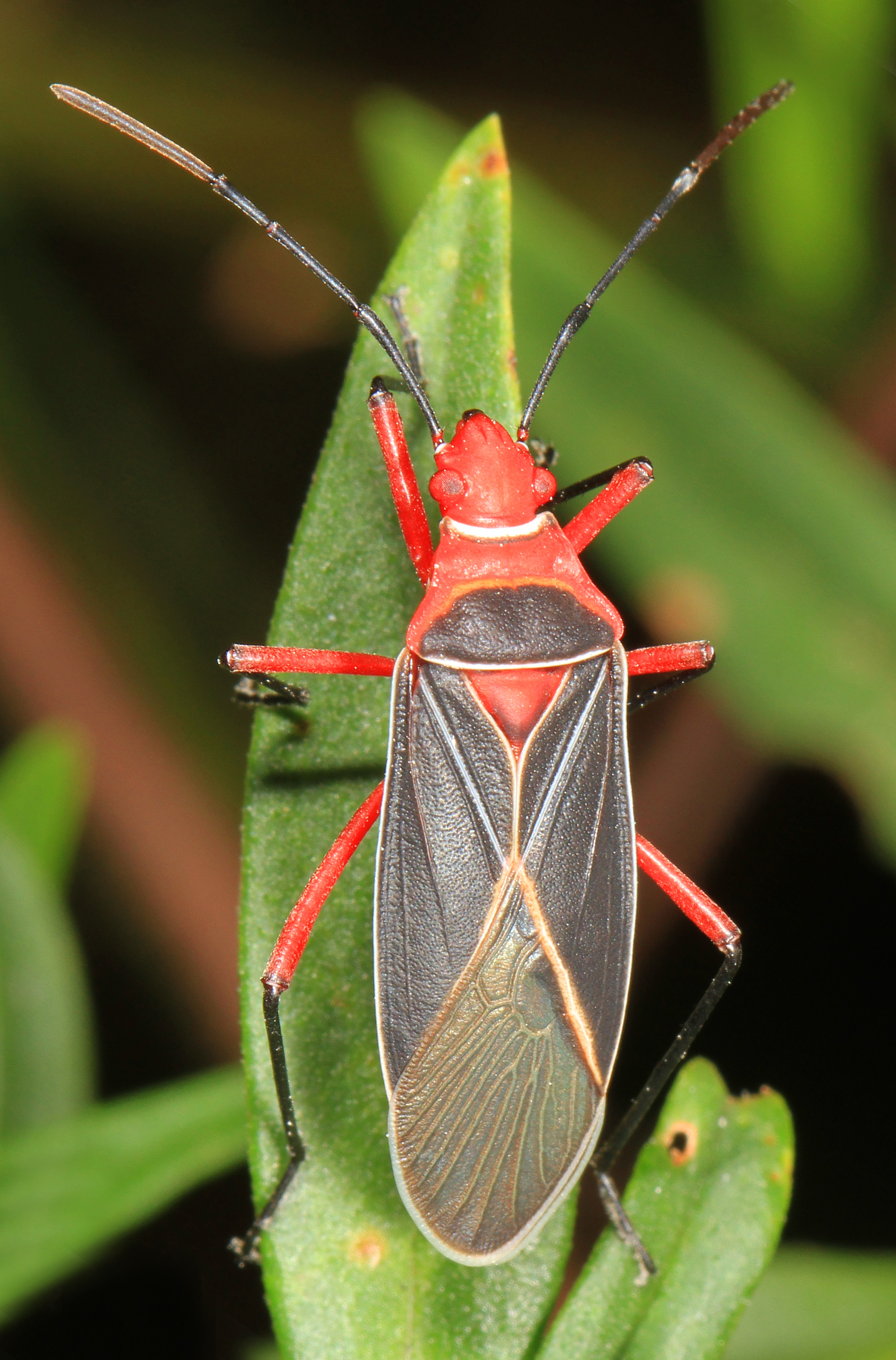
- Adult in Okaloacoochee Slough State Forest, Florida

Scientific classification
- Domain: Eukaryota
- Kingdom: Animalia
- Phylum: Arthropoda
- Class: Insecta
- Order: Hemiptera
- Suborder: Heteroptera
- Family: Pyrrhocoridae
- Genus: Dysdercus
- Species: D. suturellus

Binomial name
- Dysdercus suturellus (Herrich-Schaeffer, 1842)

= Dysdercus suturellus =

Species of true bug

Dysdercus suturellus is a species of true bug in the family Pyrrhocoridae and a species of cotton stainer. The adult insect is slender, about 1 to 1.5 cm (0.4 to 0.6 in) long, with a red thorax and dark brown wings marked with a yellow cross. It is native to the southeast of the United States, Jamaica and Puerto Rico. It is a pest of cotton crops and other plants, the adults and older nymphs feeding on the emerging bolls and the ripening seeds.

== Description ==
The adult Dysdercus suturellus is about 1 to 1.5 cm (0.4 to 0.6 in) long. It has a red head with black antennae, the first segment of which are longer than the second. The thorax has a white pronotal collar and is otherwise mostly red. The sternites of the abdomen are red, bordered with white posteriorly. The corium, the leathery base of the wings, is dark brown margined with cream, giving the insect a large cross-shaped pattern.

== Distribution and hosts ==
Dysdercus suturellus is native to the southeasternmost part of the United States, Jamaica and Puerto Rico. It is a pest of cotton crops and its distribution has been linked to the area of cotton under cultivation. Other host plants include tangerines, okra, papaya, oleander, roselle (Hibiscus sabdariffa), rose of Sharon (Hibiscus syriacus), Turk's cap mallow, teaweed (Sida sp.), Caesarweed (Urena lobata), Spanish needles (Bidens pilosa), Portia tree (Thespesia populnea), rose, eggplant, black nightshade (Solanum nigrum) and guava. The host plants are all in the families Malvaceae, Sterculiaceae, Bombacaceae and Tiliaceae.

== Life cycle ==
Dysdercus suturellus is a true bug and does not undergo metamorphosis. The eggs are pale yellow and are laid singly or in small groups in sand, leaf or plant debris, and hatch in about a week. The nymphs pass through five instars (developmental stages) over the course of three to five weeks. The first instar lives underground after which the nymph climbs the host plant. The nymphs are largely red but in the fourth and fifth instars, the dark wingpads are apparent as they enlarge, and the abdominal segments develop pale margins and become more obvious. There are several generations each year.

== Biology ==
The adults and late stage nymphs feed on the protein-rich seeds of their host plants. As these become available at different times of year, the winged adults migrate between different plant species. The adults have also been observed predating the larvae of the cotton leafworm (Alabama argillacea) and the larvae and pupae of the yellow scallop moth (Anomis erosa). They also feed on the nectar of many species of flowers and on various fruits, including citrus. When these insects feed on cotton bolls, the young bolls fail to mature, and the lint becomes stained which reduces the value of the crop. When they feed on citrus, they plunge their rostrum (beak-like mouthparts) deep into the fruit which may then fall a few hours later, or decay internally over the next few days.
