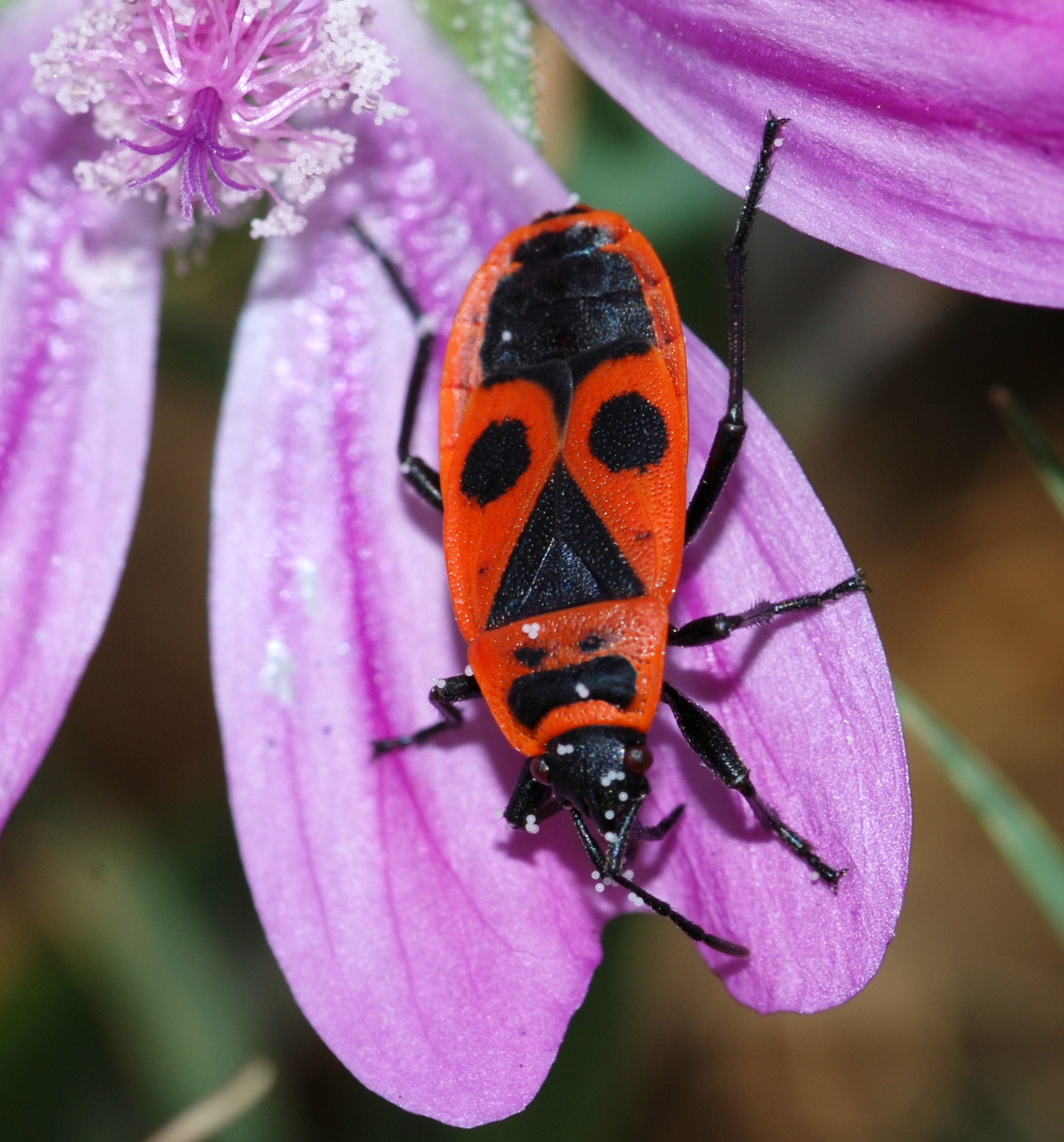
- Pyrrhocoris apterus

Scientific classification
- Kingdom: Animalia
- Phylum: Arthropoda
- Clade: Pancrustacea
- Class: Insecta
- Order: Hemiptera
- Suborder: Heteroptera
- Family: Pyrrhocoridae
- Genus: Pyrrhocoris; Fallén, 1814

Species
- see text

= Pyrrhocoris =

Genus of true bugs

Pyrrhocoris is a genus of true bugs in the family Pyrrhocoridae, the cotton stainers. Records of occurrence are mainly in the Palaearctic realm, with some from North America and East Asia.

== Species ==
Species in the genus include:

- Pyrrhocoris apterus (Linnaeus, 1758)
- Pyrrhocoris fuscopunctatus (Stål, 1858)
- Pyrrhocoris marginatus (Kolenati, 1845)
- Pyrrhocoris niger (Reuter, 1888)
- Pyrrhocoris rottensis Kment, 2021
- Pyrrhocoris sibiricus Kuschakewitsch, 1866
- Pyrrhocoris sinuaticollis (Reuter, 1885)
- Pyrrhocoris tibialis Statz & Wagner, 1950

The best known species by far is Pyrrhocoris apterus, commonly called the firebug, red firebug, linden bug, sap sucking bug, and red soldier bug. This species have been studied extensively as an experimental model species.
