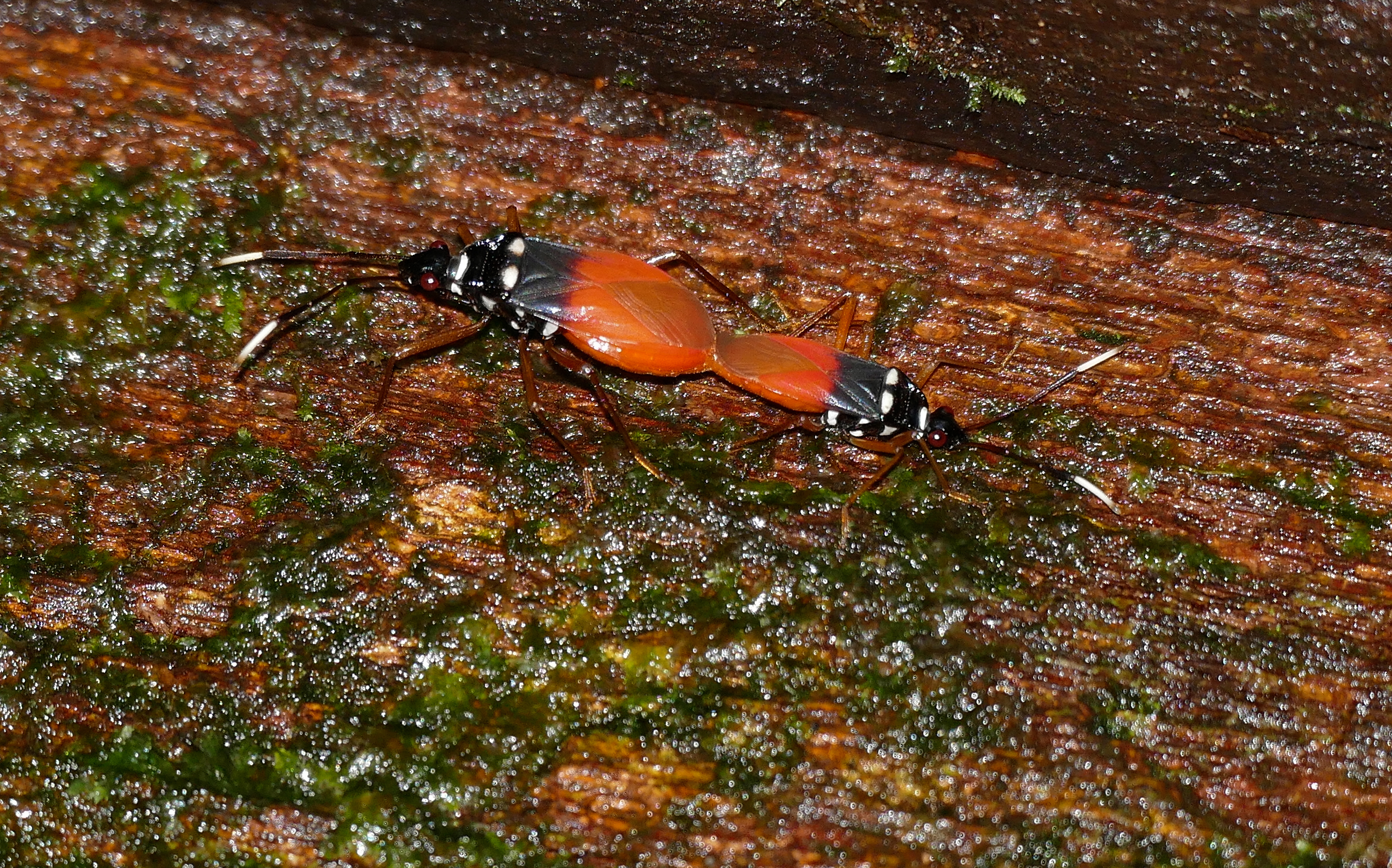
- Dindymus pulcher mating

Scientific classification
- Kingdom: Animalia
- Phylum: Arthropoda
- Clade: Pancrustacea
- Class: Insecta
- Order: Hemiptera
- Suborder: Heteroptera
- Family: Pyrrhocoridae
- Genus: Dindymus; Stål, 1861

Species
- See text

Synonyms
- Anthridindymus Stehlik, 2006; Cornidindymus Stehlik, 2005; Limadindymus Stehlik, 2005; Pseudodindymus Stehlik, 2009; Dyndimus Stehlík & Jindra, 2006 (Missp.)

= Dindymus =

Genus of true bugs

Dindymus is Old World genus of true bugs in the family Pyrrhocoridae. Records of occurrence include Africa, but most are in South East Asia and Australia.

== Description ==
These bugs are often coloured red/orange and black; they may be confused with bugs in the family Lygaeidae, but can be distinguished by the lack of ocelli on the head.

== Species ==
BioLib lists:

subgenus Cornidindymus Stehlík, 2005

1. Dindymus abdominalis Distant, 1914
2. Dindymus griseus Stehlík, 2006
3. Dindymus straeleni Schouteden, 1933

subgenus Dindymus Stål, 1861

1. Dindymus albicornis (Fabricius, 1803)
2. Dindymus albomarginatus Stehlík, 2007
3. Dindymus brevis Blöte, 1931
4. Dindymus chinensis Stehlík & Jindra, 2006
5. Dindymus croesus Distant, 1914
6. Dindymus decisus Walker, 1873
7. Dindymus decolor Breddin, 1900
8. Dindymus flavipennis Blöte, 1931
9. Dindymus lanius Stål, 1863
10. Dindymus medogensis S.L. Liu, 1981
11. Dindymus punctithorax Stehlík, 2006
12. Dindymus pyrochrous (Boisduval, 1835)
13. Dindymus rubiginosus (Fabricius, 1787)
14. Dindymus sanguineus (Fabricius, 1794)

subgenus Limadindymus Stehlík, 2005

1. Dindymus brunneus (Stehlík, 2005)
2. Dindymus dispersus Stehlík, 2006
3. Dindymus kotheae (Stehlík, 2005)
4. Dindymus montanellus (Stehlík, 2005)
5. Dindymus riedeli (Stehlík, 2005)
6. Dindymus schoenitzeri (Stehlík, 2005)

subgenus Pseudodindymus Stehlík, 2009

1. Dindymus sandakan Stehlík, 2010

incertae sedis

1. Dindymus amboinensis (Fabricius, 1803)
2. Dindymus basifer Walker, 1873
3. Dindymus bifurcatus Stehlík & Jindra, 2006
4. Dindymus bougainvillensis Stehlík, 2006
5. Dindymus circumcinctus Stål, 1863
6. Dindymus constanti Stehlík & Jindra, 2006
7. Dindymus dembickyi Stehlík, 2006
8. Dindymus fecialis Stål, 1863
9. Dindymus flammeolus (Distant, 1901)
10. Dindymus kokadanus Stehlík, 2006
11. Dindymus lautereri Stehlík, 2006
12. Dindymus malayensis Stehlík, 2006
13. Dindymus minutus Blöte, 1933
14. Dindymus nitidicollis Stehlík, 2006
15. Dindymus pectoralis Schmidt, 1932
16. Dindymus pulcher Stal, 1863
17. Dindymus rubriventris Stehlík, 2006
18. Dindymus talaudensis Stehlík & Jindra, 2006
19. Dindymus thunbergi Stål, 1856.
20. Dindymus ventralis Mayr, 1866
21. Dindymus versicolor (Herrich-Schaeffer, 1853)
22. Dindymus webbi Stehlík, 2006
23. Dindymus wynigerae Stehlík & Jindra, 2006

Several species in the genus are beneficial predators, including D. rubiginosus, D. pulcher. and D. pyrochrous, but one species (D. versicolor) is a minor plant pest.
