= Raxa =

Scientific classification
- Kingdom: Animalia
- Phylum: Arthropoda
- Class: Insecta
- Order: Hemiptera
- Suborder: Heteroptera
- Family: Pyrrhocoridae
- Genus: Raxa; Distant, 1919

Genus of true bugs

Raxa is a genus of true bugs in the family Pyrrhocoridae. Unlike most pyrrhocorids, members of this genus are predatory, rather than herbivorous.

== Examples ==
Raxa nishidai is the specialist predator of Melamphaus faber, a seed-feeding pyrrhocorid bug. R. nishidai is found in West Java, Indonesia.

Raxa collaris is found in Vietnam and Laos.
