= Antilochus (historian) =

Antilochus (Ancient Greek: Ἀντίλοχος) was a historian of ancient Greece who wrote an account of the Greek philosophers from the time of Pythagoras to the death of Epicurus, whose system he himself adopted. He seems to be the same as the "Antilogus" mentioned by Dionysius of Halicarnassus. Theodoret quotes an Antilochus as his authority for placing the tomb of Cecrops I on the acropolis of Athens, but as Clement of Alexandria and Arnobius refer for the same fact to a writer of the name of "Antiochus", there may possibly be an error in Theodoret.
