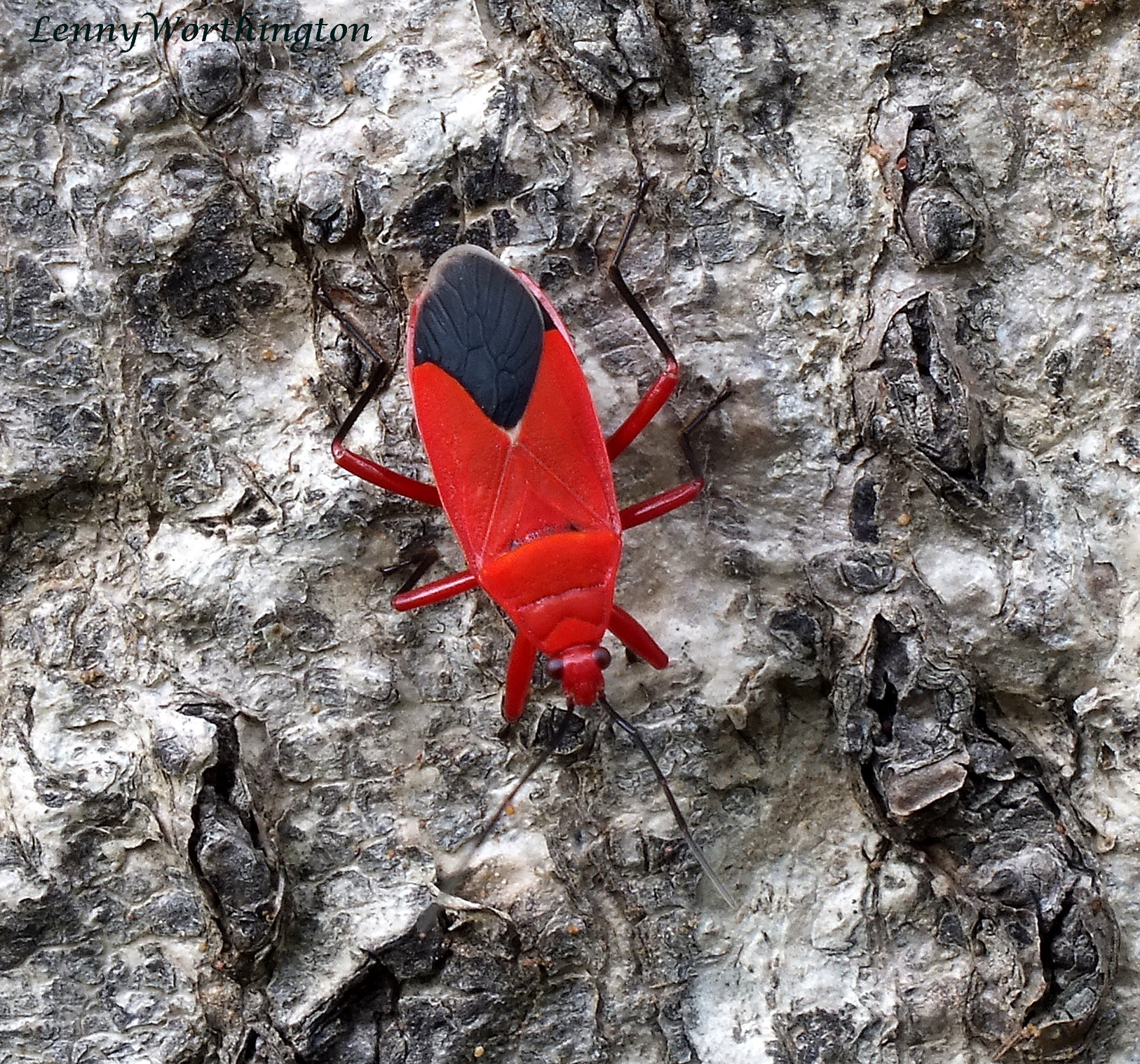
- Antilochus coquebertii

Scientific classification
- Kingdom: Animalia
- Phylum: Arthropoda
- Clade: Pancrustacea
- Class: Insecta
- Order: Hemiptera
- Suborder: Heteroptera
- Family: Pyrrhocoridae
- Genus: Antilochus; Stål, 1863

Type species
- Lygaeus coquebertii Fabricius, 1803

Synonyms
- Neaeretus Reuter, 1887

= Antilochus (bug) =

Genus of true bugs

Antilochus is an Old World genus of true bugs in the family Pyrrhocoridae, erected by Carl Stål in 1863. Species in this genus occurs in tropical Africa including Madagascar, South and Southeast Asia, the Malay Archipelago, and New Guinea. About 20-30 species are known in the genus.

== Description ==
Antilochus are brightly coloured, usually red and black, and easily differentiated from other pyrrhocorids by the head being transversely depressed behind the eyes. They are often confused with bugs in the family Lygaeidae, but can be distinguished by the lack of ocelli on the head. Unlike most pyrrhocorids, Antilochus species are predatory, rather than herbivorous.

== Species ==
Species that have been described in the genus include:

- Antilochus amorosus Breddin, 1909
- Antilochus angulifer (Walker, 1873)
- Antilochus angustus Stehlík, 2009
- Antilochus astridae Schouteden, 1933
- Antilochus bicolor Lethierry, 1888
- Antilochus boerhaviae (Fabricius, 1794)
- Antilochus coloratus (Walker, 1872)
- Antilochus coquebertii (Fabricius, 1803)
- Antilochus discifer Stål, 1863
- Antilochus discoidalis (Burmeister, 1834)
- Antilochus grelaki Schmidt, 1932
- Antilochus histrionicus Stål, 1863
- Antilochus immundulus Breddin, 1901
- Antilochus kubani Stehlík, 2005
- Antilochus latiusculus Blöte, 1932
- Antilochus lineatipes (Stål, 1858)
- Antilochus maximus Breddin, 1900
- Antilochus nigripes (Burmeister, 1835)
- Antilochus nigrocruciatus (Stål, 1855)
- Antilochus reflexus Stål, 1863
- Antilochus russus Stål, 1863
- Antilochus sulawesiensis Stehlík, 2009
- Antilochus webbi Stehlík, 2009

Subgenus Neaeretus

- Antilochus boerhaviae (Fabricius, 1794)
- Antilochus distantii (Reuter, 1887)
- Antilochus kmenti Stehlík, 2009
- Antilochus nigrocruciatus (Stål, 1855)
- Antilochus pterobrachys Stehlík, 2011
- Antilochus similis Stehlík, 2009
- Antilochus violaceus (Carlini, 1892)
