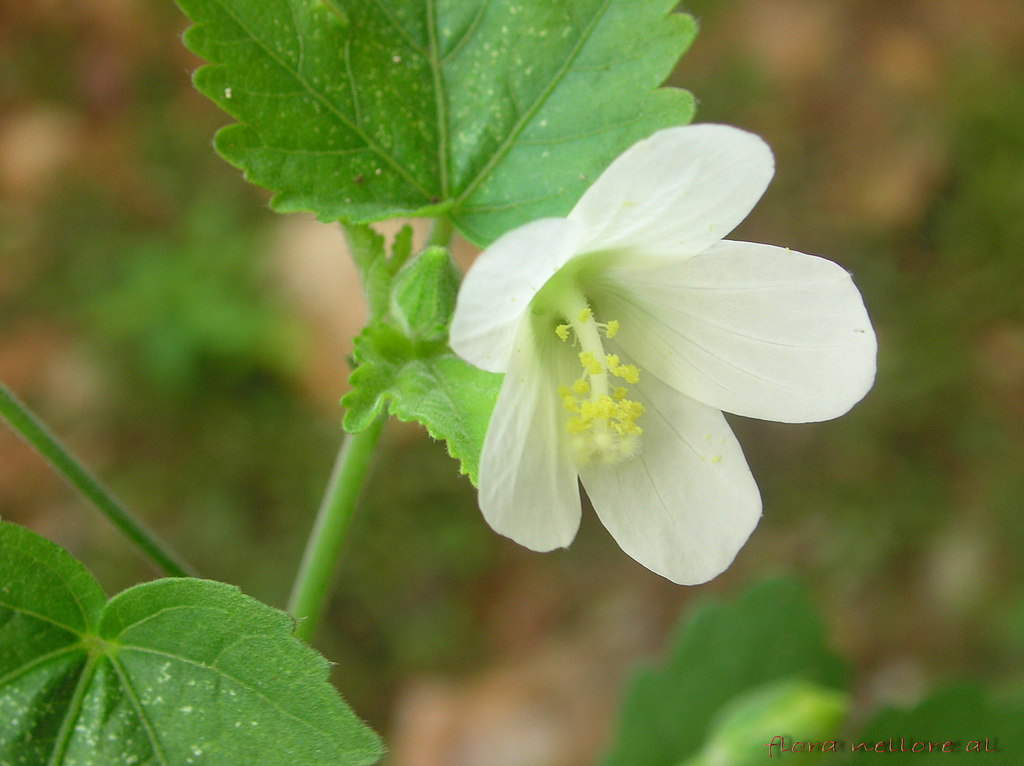
- Flower
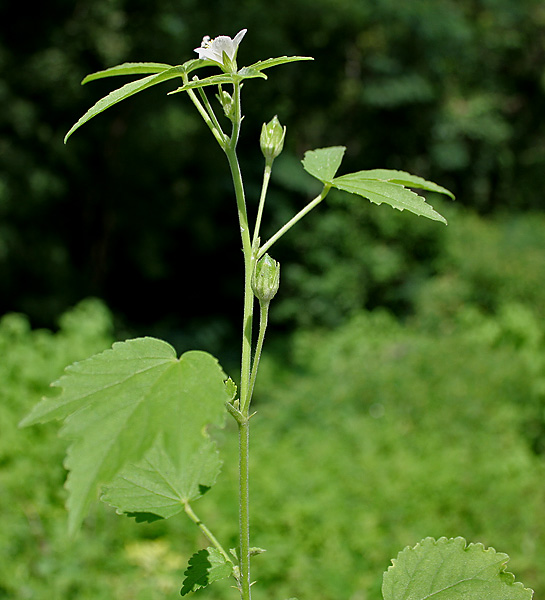
- Habit is erect

Scientific classification
- Kingdom: Plantae
- Clade: Tracheophytes
- Clade: Angiosperms
- Clade: Eudicots
- Clade: Rosids
- Order: Malvales
- Family: Malvaceae
- Genus: Hibiscus
- Species: H. lobatus

Binomial name
- Hibiscus lobatus (Murray) Kuntze

Synonyms
- List: Hibiscus abyssinicus Steud.; Hibiscus albus Wall.; Hibiscus lobatus var. sinuatus Hochr.; Hibiscus ochroleucus Baker; Hibiscus parkeri Baker; Hibiscus parviflorus R.Br.; Hibiscus pumilus Roxb.; Hibiscus solandra L'Hér.; Hibiscus torulosus Salisb.; Laguna abyssinica Hochst. ex A.Rich.; Laguna lobata (Murray) Willd.; Laguna sileniflora Wall.; Lagunaria lobata (Murray) Schreb. ex Spreng.; Sida diversifolia Spreng.; Sida heterophylla Klein ex Spreng.; Solandra lobata Murray; Triguera acerifolia Cav.

= Hibiscus lobatus =

Species of plant

Hibiscus lobatus, the lobed leaf mallow, is a species of flowering plant in the family Malvaceae. It is native to parts of the seasonally dry Old World Tropics, from Senegal in Africa to Hainan in China, and it has been introduced to Trinidad and Tobago. An annual with white (or yellow) flowers, it lacks the pseudo-sepals which are found in all Hibiscus.
