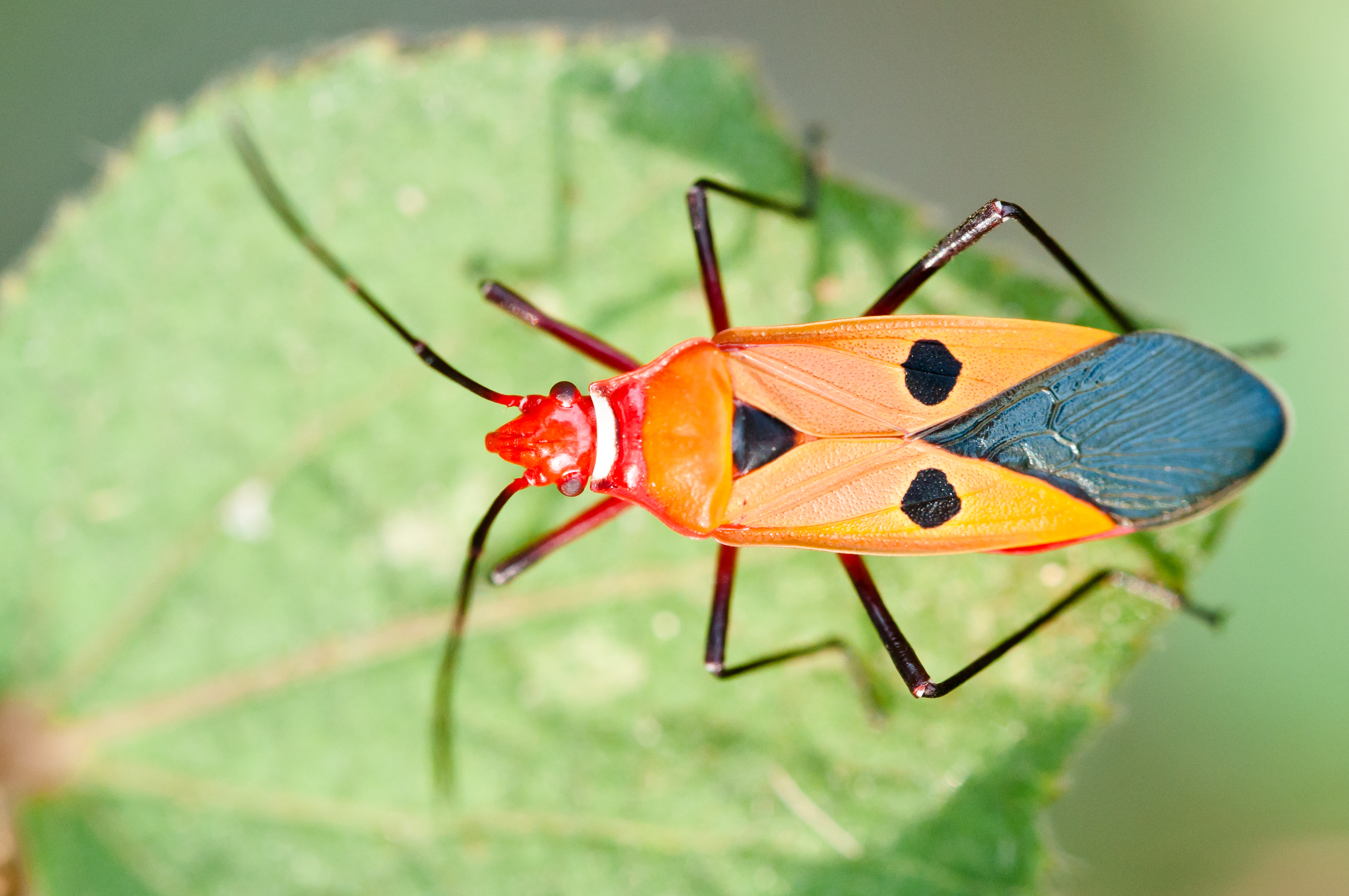

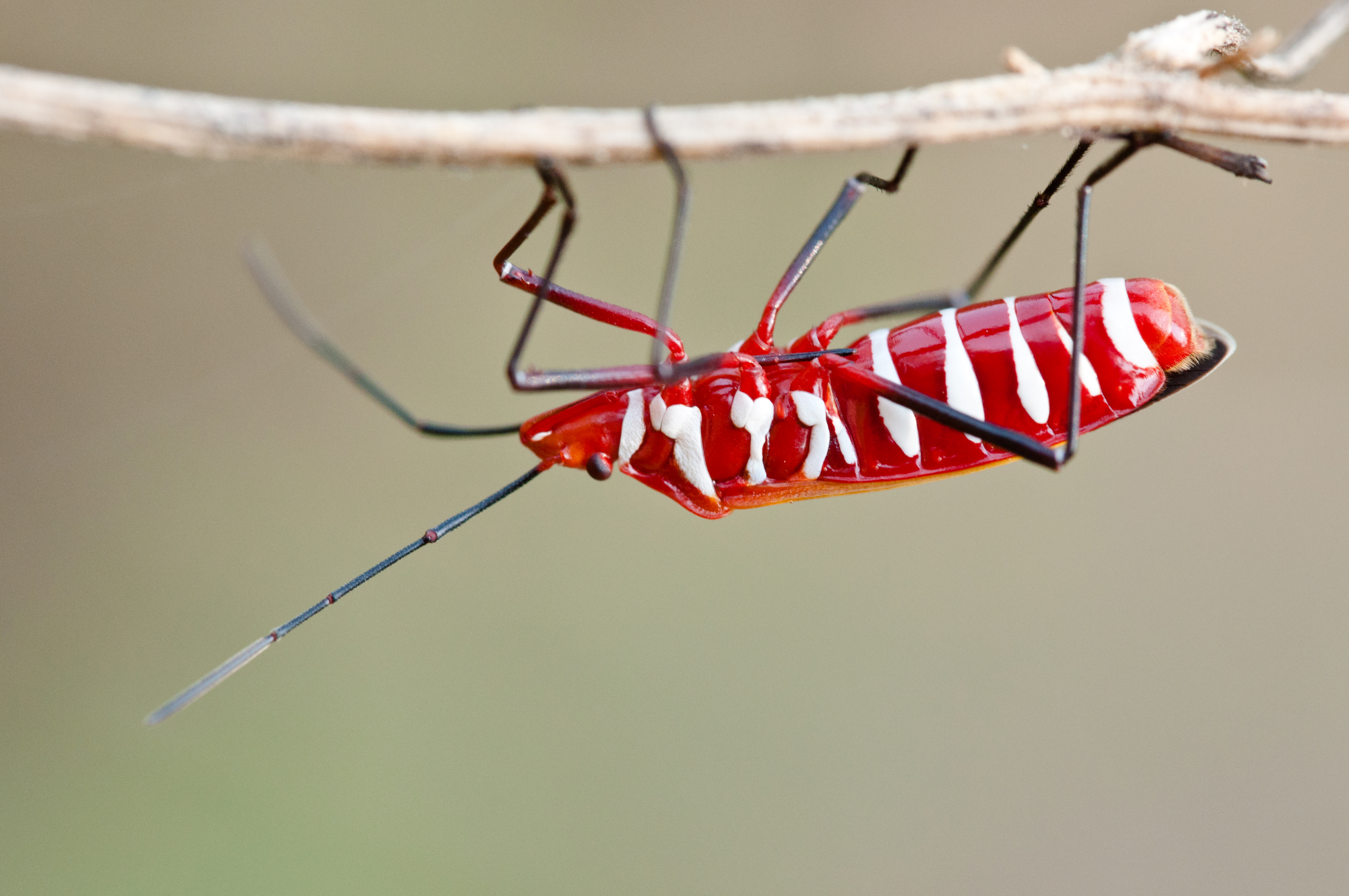
- Different aspects of D. cingulatus in Kaeng Krachan National Park, Thailand

Scientific classification
- Kingdom: Animalia
- Phylum: Arthropoda
- Clade: Pancrustacea
- Class: Insecta
- Order: Hemiptera
- Suborder: Heteroptera
- Family: Pyrrhocoridae
- Genus: Dysdercus; Guerin-Méneville, 1831

Species
- see text

= Dysdercus =

Genus of true bugs

Dysdercus is a widespread genus of true bugs in the family Pyrrhocoridae; a number of species attacking cotton bolls may be called "cotton stainers".

== Description ==
Species may be confused with bugs in the family Lygaeidae, but can be distinguished by the lack of ocelli on the head. They can be readily distinguished from most other genera of Pyrrhocoridae by the strong white markings at the junction of the head and thorax, and along the sides of the thorax, and often abdomen.

== Ecology ==
Some members of the genus attack cotton bolls and are known as "cotton stainers." There are several species of tachinid flies that are parasitoids of Dysdercus nymphs and have been used as biocontrol agents.

== Species ==
subgenus Dysdercus Guérin-Méneville, 1831

- Dysdercus albofasciatus Berg, 1878
- Dysdercus albomaculatus Doesburg, 1968
- Dysdercus andreae (Linnaeus, 1758)
- Dysdercus basialbus Schmidt, 1932
- Dysdercus bimaculatus (Stål, 1854)
- Dysdercus bloetei Doesburg, 1968
- Dysdercus capitatus Distant, 1883
- Dysdercus cardinalis Gerstäcker, 1873
- Dysdercus chaquensis Freiberg, 1948
- Dysdercus chiriquinus Distant, 1883
- Dysdercus concinnus Stål, 1861
- Dysdercus cordillerensis Doesburg, 1968
- Dysdercus discolor Walker, 1872
- Dysdercus fasciatus Signoret, 1861 - cotton stainer (Africa)
- Dysdercus fernaldi Ballou, 1906
- Dysdercus fervidus Bergroth, 1914
- Dysdercus flavidus Signoret, 1861
- Dysdercus flavolimbatus Stål, 1861
- Dysdercus fulvoniger (De Geer, 1773)
- Dysdercus goyanus Doesburg, 1968
- Dysdercus honestus Blöte, 1931
- Dysdercus imitator Blöte, 1931
- Dysdercus immarginatus Blöte, 1931
- Dysdercus jamaicensis Walker, 1872
- Dysdercus longirostris Stål, 1861
- Dysdercus lunulatus Uhler, 1861
- Dysdercus luteus Doesburg, 1968
- Dysdercus maurus Distant, 1901
- Dysdercus melanoderes Karsch, 1892
- Dysdercus mimuloides Blöte, 1933
- Dysdercus mimulus Hussey, 1929
- Dysdercus mimus (Say, 1832)
- Dysdercus neglectus Doesburg, 1968
- Dysdercus nigrofasciatus Stål, 1855
- Dysdercus obliquus (Herrich-Schaeffer, 1843)
- Dysdercus obscuratus Distant, 1883
- Dysdercus ocreatus (Say, 1832)
- Dysdercus ortus Distant, 1909
- Dysdercus peruvianus Guérin-Méneville, 1831 - type species
- Dysdercus ruficeps (Perty, 1833)
- Dysdercus ruficollis (Linnaeus, 1764)
- Dysdercus rusticus Stål, 1870
- Dysdercus sanguinarius Stål, 1870
- Dysdercus superstitiosus (Fabricius, 1775)
- Dysdercus suturellus (Herrich-Schäffer, 1842) - cotton stainer (USA)
- Dysdercus urbahni Schmidt, 1932
- Dysdercus wilhelminae Doesburg, 1968

subgenus Leptophthalmus Stål, 1870 (= Megadysdercus Breddin, 1900)

- Dysdercus argillaceus Breddin, 1895
- Dysdercus decussatus Boisduval, 1835
- Dysdercus fuscomaculatus Stål, 1863
- Dysdercus philippinus Herrich-Schaeffer 1850

subgenus Neodysdercus Stehlík, 1965

- Dysdercus haemorrhoidalis Signoret, 1858
- Dysdercus intermedius Distant, 1902 - cotton stainer (Africa)
- Dysdercus orientalis Schouteden, 1910
- Dysdercus pretiosus Distant, 1902

subgenus Paradysdercus Stehlík, 1965

- Dysdercus cingulatus (Fabricius, 1775) - red cotton stainer
- Dysdercus evanescens Distant, 1902
- Dysdercus festivus Gerstäcker, 1892
- Dysdercus koenigii (Fabricius, 1775) - red cotton stainer (Indian subcontinent)
- Dysdercus longiceps Breddin, 1901
- Dysdercus micropygus Breddin, 1909
- Dysdercus poecilus (Harrich-Schaeffer)
- Dysdercus sidae Montrouzier, 1861

incertae sedis

- Dysdercus bidentatus Hussey, 1927
- Dysdercus cinctus Scudder, 1890
- Dysdercus collaris Blöte, 1931
- Dysdercus impictiventris Stål, 1870
- Dysdercus insularis Stål, 1870
- Dysdercus scassellati Del Guercio, 1918
- Dysdercus stehliki Schaefer, 2013
- Dysdercus unicolor Scudder, 1890
