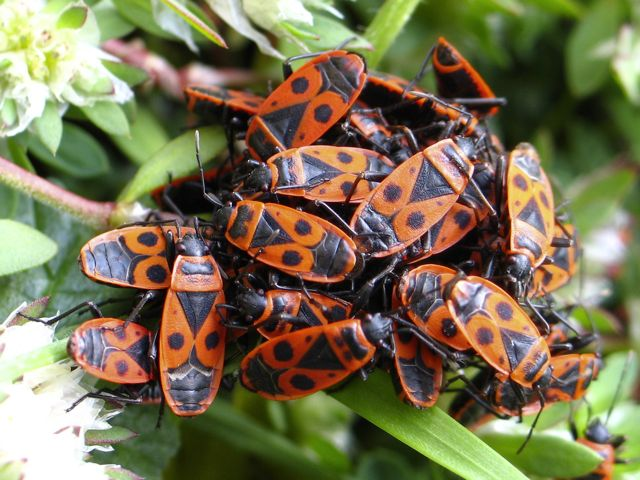
- Pyrrhocoris apterus (Spain) with reduced wings

Scientific classification
- Kingdom: Animalia
- Phylum: Arthropoda
- Class: Insecta
- Order: Hemiptera
- Suborder: Heteroptera
- Superfamily: Pyrrhocoroidea
- Family: Pyrrhocoridae; Fieber, 1860

Type genus
- Pyrrhocoris Fallen, 1814

Genera
- See text

= Pyrrhocoridae =

Red bugs, cotton stainers

Family of true bugs

Pyrrhocoridae is a family of insects with more than 300 species world-wide. Many are red in colour and are known as red bugs, and some species are called cotton stainers because their feeding activities leave an indelible yellow-brownish stain on cotton crops. A common species in parts of Europe is the firebug, and its genus name Pyrrhocoris and the family name are derived from the Greek roots for fire "pyrrho-" and bug "coris". Members of this family are often confused with, but can be quickly separated from, Lygaeidae by the lack of ocelli (simple eyes) on the top of the head.

== Description ==
The membrane of the forewing has one or two cells from which about 7-8 branching veins emerge that may have branches that fuse together (anastomose) while the main veins reach the margins of the wing. They have three tarsal segments. They can be very difficult to separate from some members of the family Largidae, which also share some of these characters and belong to the same superfamily. Largids tend to have the edge of the pronotum (the top of the first thoracic segment) rounded, but the taxonomic feature for separating them is the found only in females. Female largids have the sixth visible (actually the seventh) abdominal segment appearing to be split in the middle, whereas it is undivided in female pyrrhocorids. A few bugs in the family Rhopalidae have similar colors (e.g., Corizus hyoscyami) but they have ocelli, as do lygaeids.

The scutellum is small and triangular. The antennae are made up of four segments, with the second segment longer than the third. The beak-like mouthpart, or rostrum, has four segments, and its tip reaches at least the base of the middle pair of legs. Some species have the wing reduced so that the abdomen is visible from above. More detailed distinguishing features that are usually visible only under a microscope, include a much reduced scent gland opening on the mid-thoracic segment. There are three sensory hairs or trichobothria on the abdominal segments 3 to 6 and two such hairs on the seventh segment.

The genus Myrmoplasta is found in the African and Oriental regions and is somewhat unusual in having highly reduced wings and appearing ant-like or myrmecomorphic. Males and females differ in their foreleg morphology, although such sexual dimorphism is also found in a few other genera.

== Food ==
Most species feed on seeds or fruits particularly of plants belonging to the Malvales but a few feed on rotting debris including dead animal matter. A few species are predatory; Raxa nishidai is a predator of another pyrrhocorid, Melamphaus faber, while Antilochus coquebertii feeds on other bugs including Dysdercus cingulatus. A few are important crop pests. One species, Dysdercus suturellus, is well known in the southern cotton growing regions of the United States while Dysdercus cingulatus occurs on cotton in tropical Asia. They damage cotton bolls by staining as well as by cutting the fibres.

== Genera ==
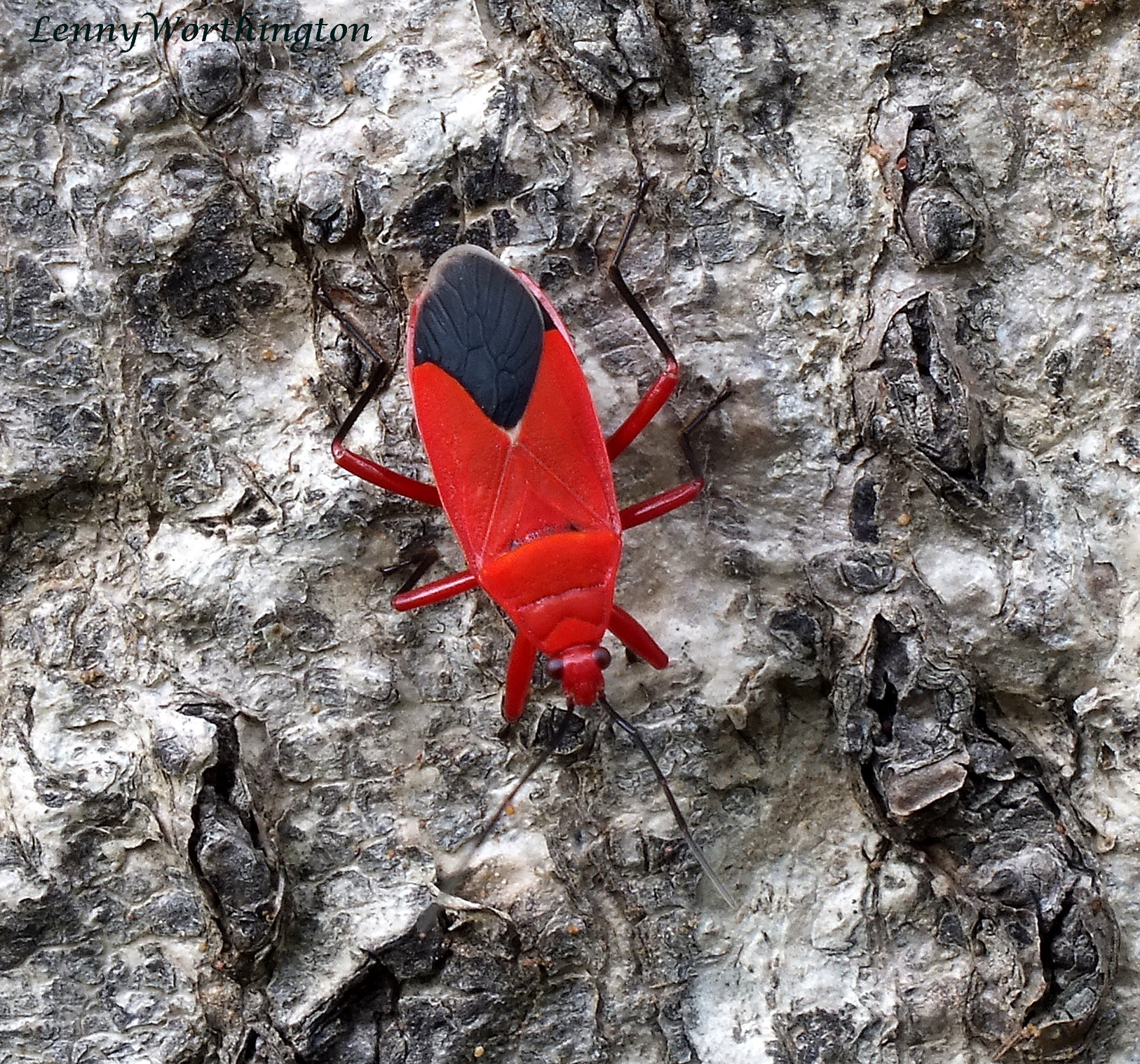
Antilochus coquebertii

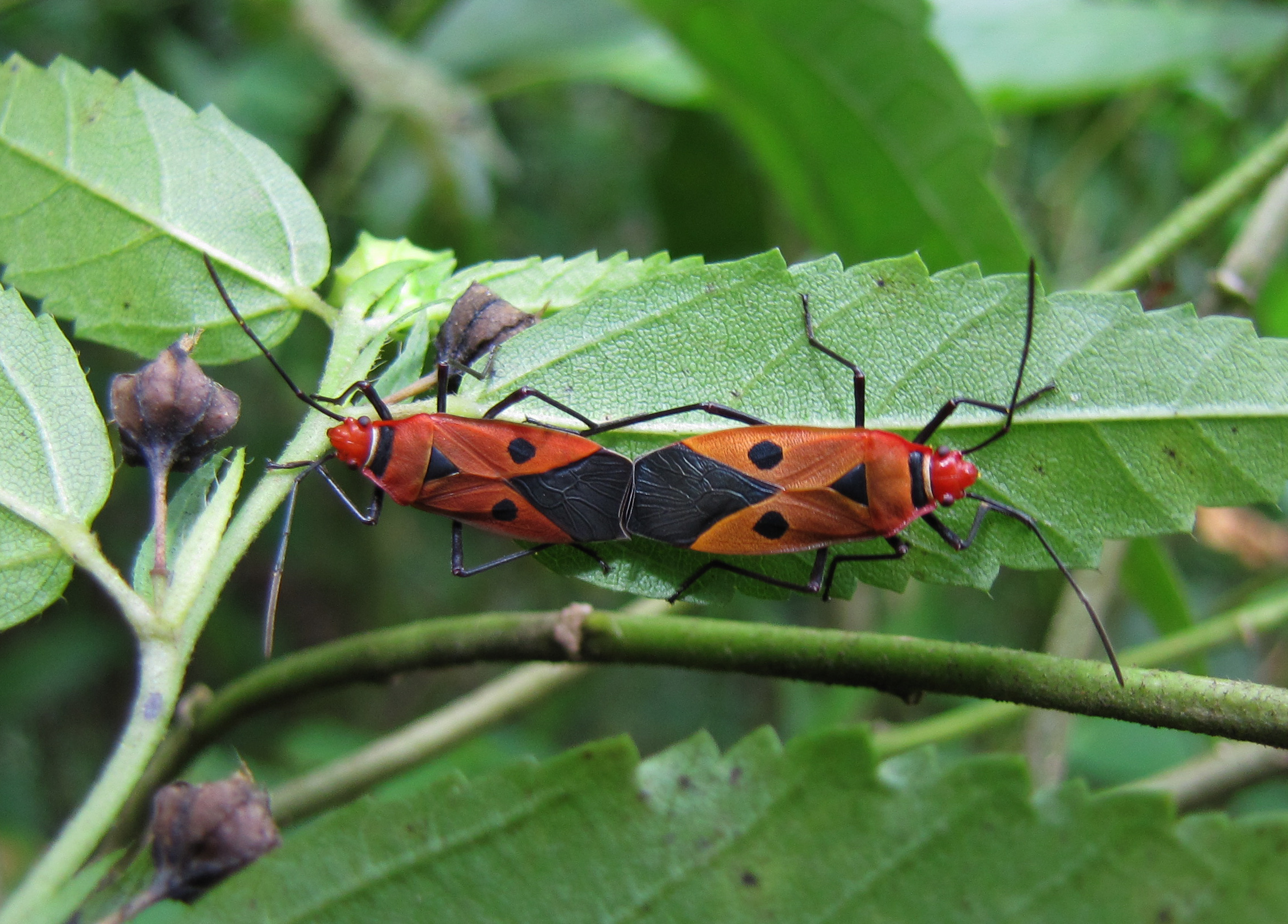
Dysdercus cingulatus, India

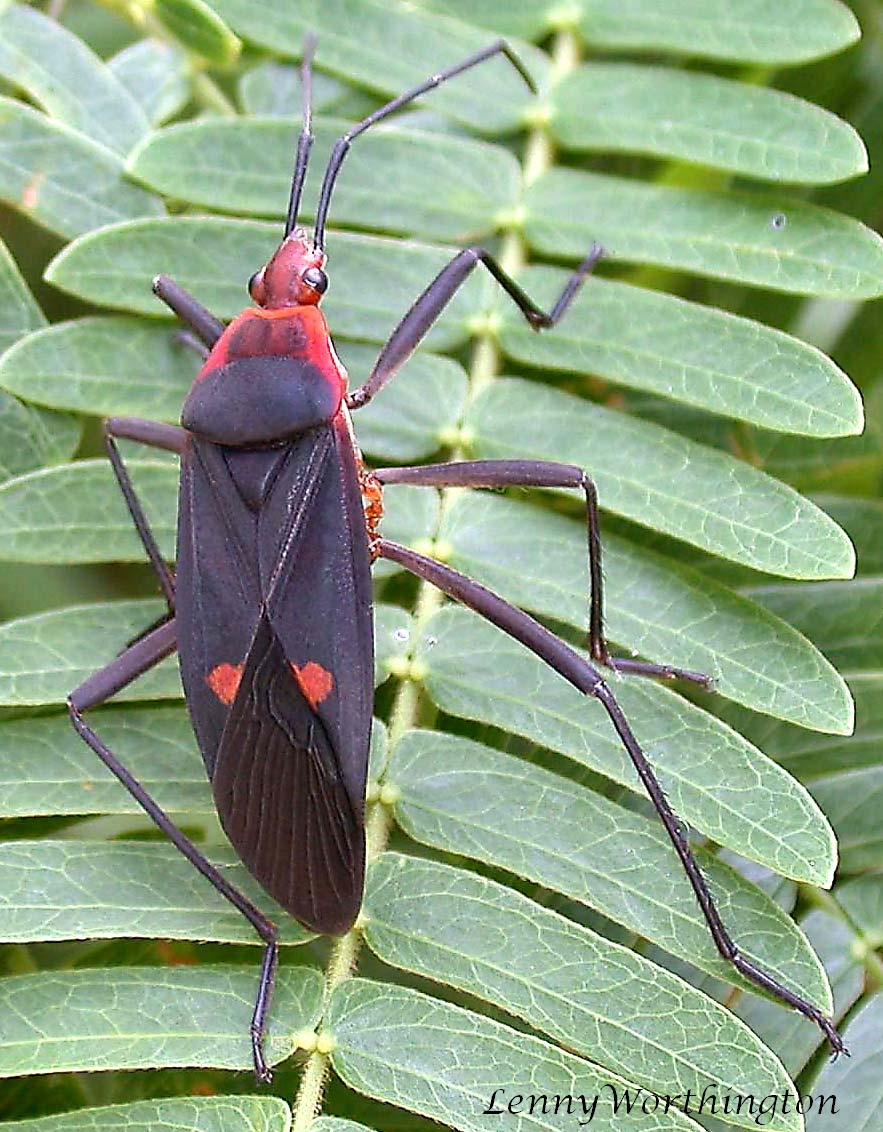
Melamphaus faber

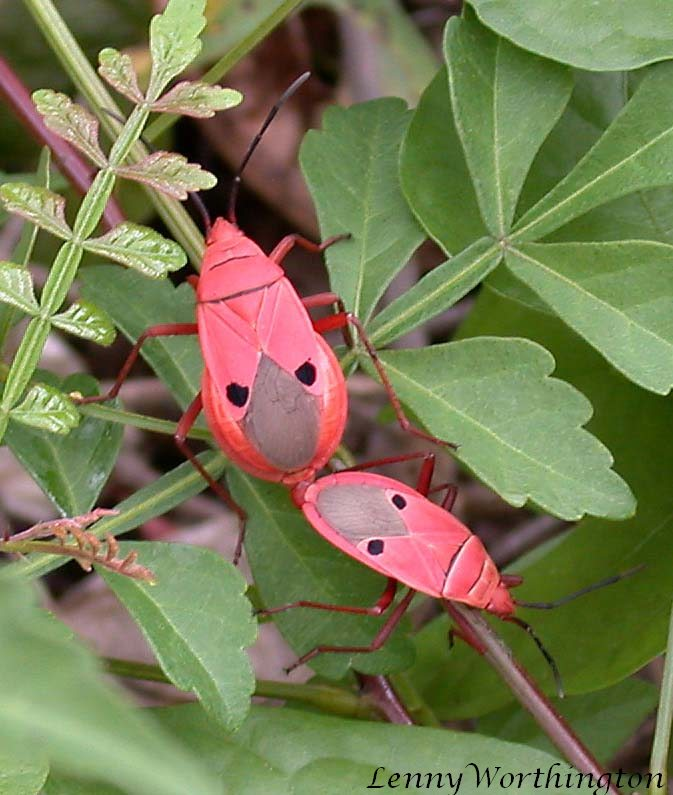
Probergrothius nigricornis

Genera within this family include:

1. Aderrhis Bergroth, 1906
2. Antilochus Stål, 1863
3. Armatillus Distant, 1908
4. Australodindymus Stehlík & Jindra, 2012
5. Brancucciana Ahmad & Zaidi, 1986
6. Callibaphus Stål, 1868
7. Cenaeus Stål, 1861
8. Dermatinus Stål, 1853
9. Dindymus Stål, 1861
10. Dynamenais Kirkaldy, 1905
11. Dysdercus Guérin-Méneville, 1831
12. Ectatops Amyot & Audinet-Serville, 1843
13. Euscopus Stål, 1870
14. Froeschnerocoris Ahmad & Kamaluddin, 1986
15. Gromierus Villiers, 1951
16. Guentheriana Stehlík, 2006
17. Heissianus Stehlík, 2006
18. Melamphaus Stål, 1868
19. Myrmoplasta Gerstäcker, 1892
20. Neodindymus Stehlik, 1965
21. Neoindra Stehlik, 1965
22. Paraectatops Stehlík, 1965
23. Probergrothius Kirkaldy, 1904 (Odontopus Laporte, 1832 probably preoccupied)
24. Pyrrhocoris Fallén, 1814
25. Pyrrhopeplus Stål, 1870
26. Roscius Stål, 1866
27. Scantius Stål, 1866
28. Schmitziana Stehlik, 1977
29. Sericocoris Karsch, 1892
30. Siango Blöte, 1933
31. Sicnatus Villiers & Dekeyser, 1951
32. Silasuwe Stehlík, 2006
33. Stictaulax Stål, 1870
34. Syncrotus Bergroth, 1895
