= Carroll Williams =

American entomologist (1916–1991)

- Carroll Williams in 1956
- Born: Carroll Milton Williams; December 2, 1916; Oregon Hill, Virginia
- Died: October 11, 1991 (aged 74); Watertown, Massachusetts
- Education: University of Richmond; Harvard University
- Awards: George Ledlie Prize 1952 Newcomb Cleveland Prize
- Scientific career
- Fields: Zoology
- Workplaces: Harvard University
- Thesis: A morphological and physiological analysis of the flight of Drosophila, with special reference to the factors controlling the frequency of wingbeat. (1941)
- Doctoral advisor: Charles Brues
- Doctoral students: Fotis Kafatos

Carroll Milton Williams (December 2, 1916 in Oregon Hill, Virginia — October 11, 1991 in Watertown, Massachusetts) was an American zoologist known for his work in entomology and developmental biology—in particular, metamorphosis in insects, for which he won the George Ledlie Prize. He performed groundbreaking surgical experiments on larvae and pupae, and developed multiple new techniques, including the use of carbon dioxide as an anesthetic. His impact on entomology has been compared to that of Vincent Wigglesworth.

== Education ==
Williams was educated at the University of Richmond and Harvard University, where he was awarded a Ph.D. in zoology in 1941. Elected to the Harvard Society of Fellows, he also earned a M.D., summa cum laude.

== Career and research ==
For his thesis he studied the wingbeat frequency of Drosophila, using a stroboscopic device which he designed with the advice of Harold Edgerton.

In 1942, he began a series of experiments on metamorphosis. In the most famous one, he cut a pupa in half and connected the two halves with a small tube, to study the effect of the lesions on the metamorphosis.

Next he studied the endocrine control of the development of the giant American silkworm Hyalophora cecropia, introducing carbon dioxide as a surgical anesthetic. He showed that a hormone from the brain activated the prothoracic glands to release the moulting hormone ecdysone. When the juvenile hormone is present also, larvae moult to another larval stage. Juvenile hormone is not present during the larval-to-pupal or the pupal-to-adult moults. The pupae enter diapause which is broken when the brain has been chilled for weeks, after which it releases the brain hormone. Williams was the first to isolate juvenile hormone and ecdysone. With his students he studied cocoon-spinning behavior and the profound metabolic shutdown during diapause, and was the first to discover and isolate cocoonase and cytochrome b5, as well as the "paper factor". He subsequently proposed that hormonal analogues could be used as pesticides by disrupting the developmental cycles of insects.

Williams was the chairman of the biology department at Harvard University from 1959 to 1962, and the Benjamin Bussey Professor of Biology from 1966 until his retirement in 1987. He was a fellow of the American Academy of Arts and Sciences, and was elected to the National Academy of Sciences, where he was a member of the Academy's council for two terms and chairman of biological sciences for one. He was also a member of the Institute of Medicine, the Pontifical Academy of Sciences, and the American Philosophical Society.
