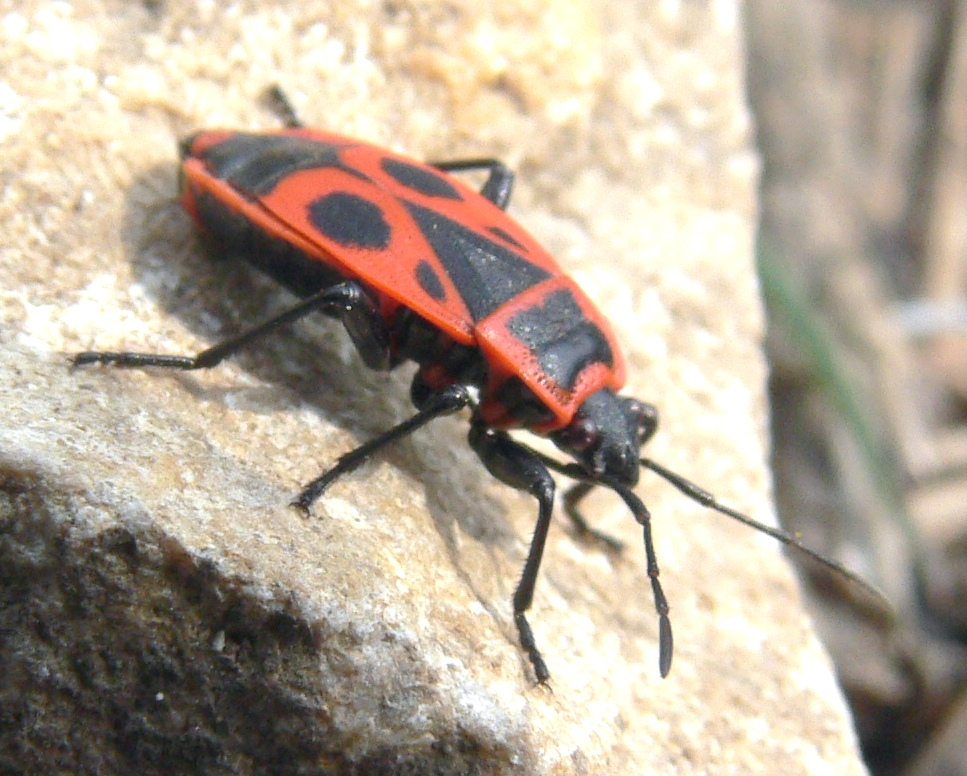

Scientific classification
- Kingdom: Animalia
- Phylum: Arthropoda
- Clade: Pancrustacea
- Class: Insecta
- Order: Hemiptera
- Suborder: Heteroptera
- Family: Pyrrhocoridae
- Genus: Pyrrhocoris
- Species: P. apterus

Binomial name
- Pyrrhocoris apterus (Linnaeus, 1758)

= Pyrrhocoris apterus =

Firebug

Species of true bug

The firebug, Pyrrhocoris apterus, is a common insect of the family Pyrrhocoridae. Easily recognisable due to its striking red and black coloration, it may be confused with the similarly coloured though unrelated Corizus hyoscyami (cinnamon bug or squash bug). (Note: See comparison) Pyrrhocoris apterus is distributed throughout the Palaearctic from the Atlantic coast of Europe to northwest China. Beyond its native Palaearctic range, it has been recorded in the United States, Central America, Southern Ontario (As an invasive species), India, and Australia. It has been reported as recently expanding its distribution northwards into mainland United Kingdom and eastward on to the coast of the Mediterranean Sea. It is frequently observed to form aggregations, especially in immature forms, containing tens to perhaps a hundred individuals.

== Reproduction ==
The firebug generally mates in April and May. Its diet consists primarily of seeds from lime trees and mallows (see below). It can often be found in groups near the base of lime tree trunks, on the sunny side.

The firebug can be seen in tandem formation when mating, which can last from 12 hours up to 7 days. It has been proposed that this long copulation duration is a form of ejaculate-guarding, a male adaptation under high competition from other males.

== Development ==
P. apterus was the subject of an unexpected discovery in the 1960s when researchers, who had for ten years been rearing the bugs in Prague, Czech Republic, attempted to do the same at Harvard University in the United States. After the fifth nymphal instar, instead of developing into adults, the bugs either entered a sixth instar stage, or became adults with nymphal characteristics. Some of the sixth instars went on to a seventh instar, but all specimens died without reaching maturity. The source of the problem was eventually proven to be the paper towels used in the rearing process; the effect only happened if the paper towels were made in America. The researchers could replicate these results with American newspapers such as the New York Times, but not European newspapers such as The Times. The cause was found to be hormones found in the native balsam fir tree (Abies balsamea) used to manufacture paper and related products in America, and in some other North American conifers. This hormone happened to have a profound effect on P. apterus, but not on other insect species, showing the diversification of hormone receptors in the insects. The most potent chemical component was later identified as juvabione, the methyl ester of todomatuic acid, which is produced by the trees in response to wounding; it mimics juvenile hormone closely at the chemical level, defending against vulnerable pests.

== Gallery ==
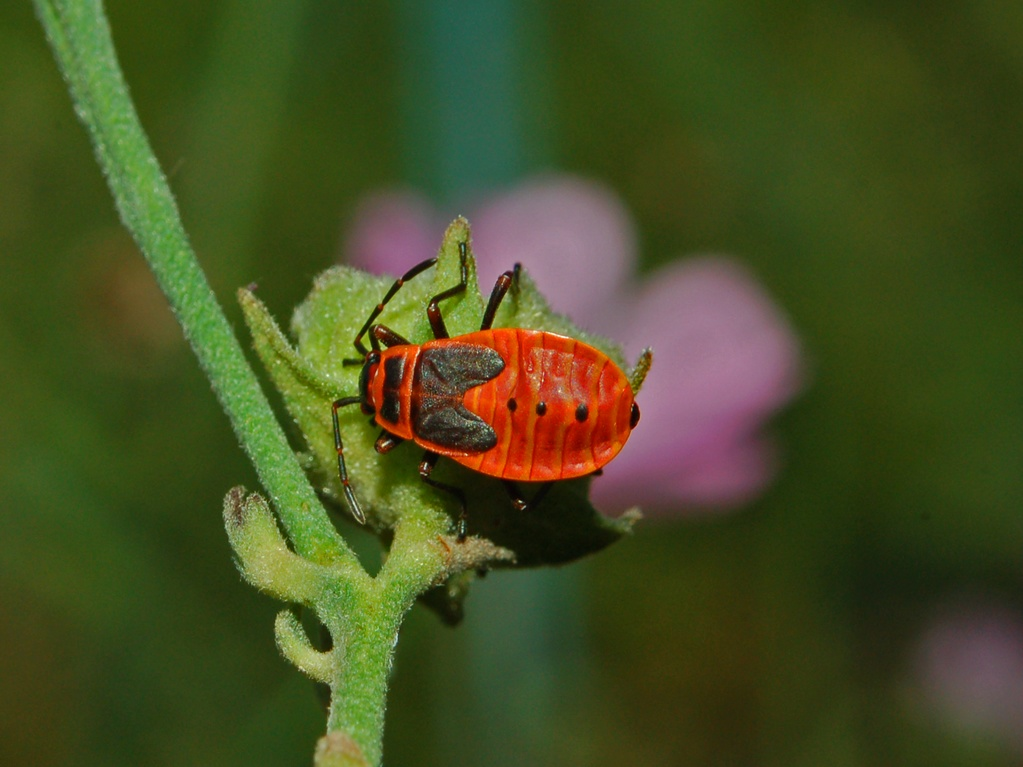
Nymph

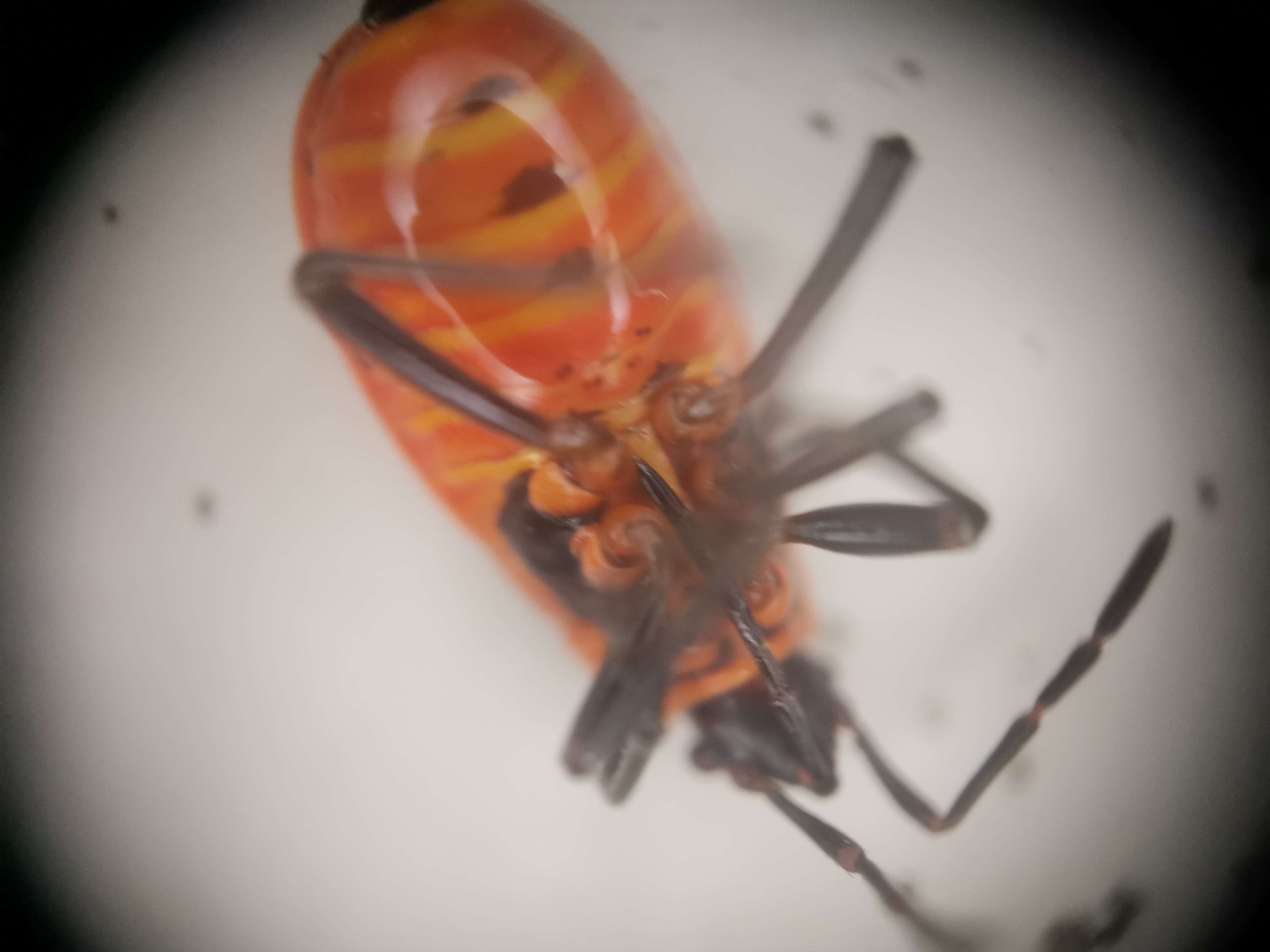
Nymph ventral side

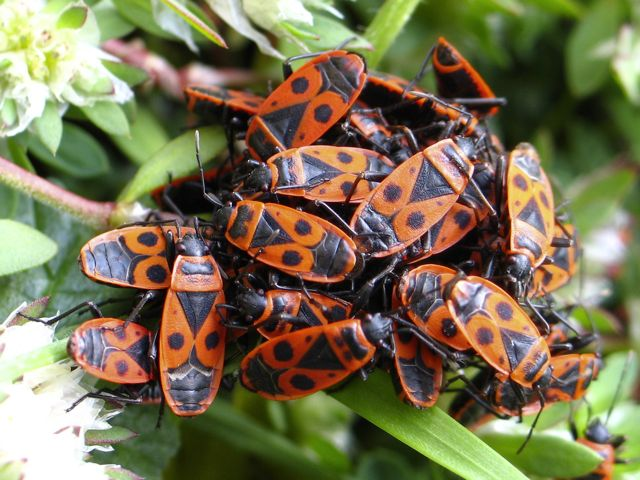
Firebugs in Spain showing aggregation behavior

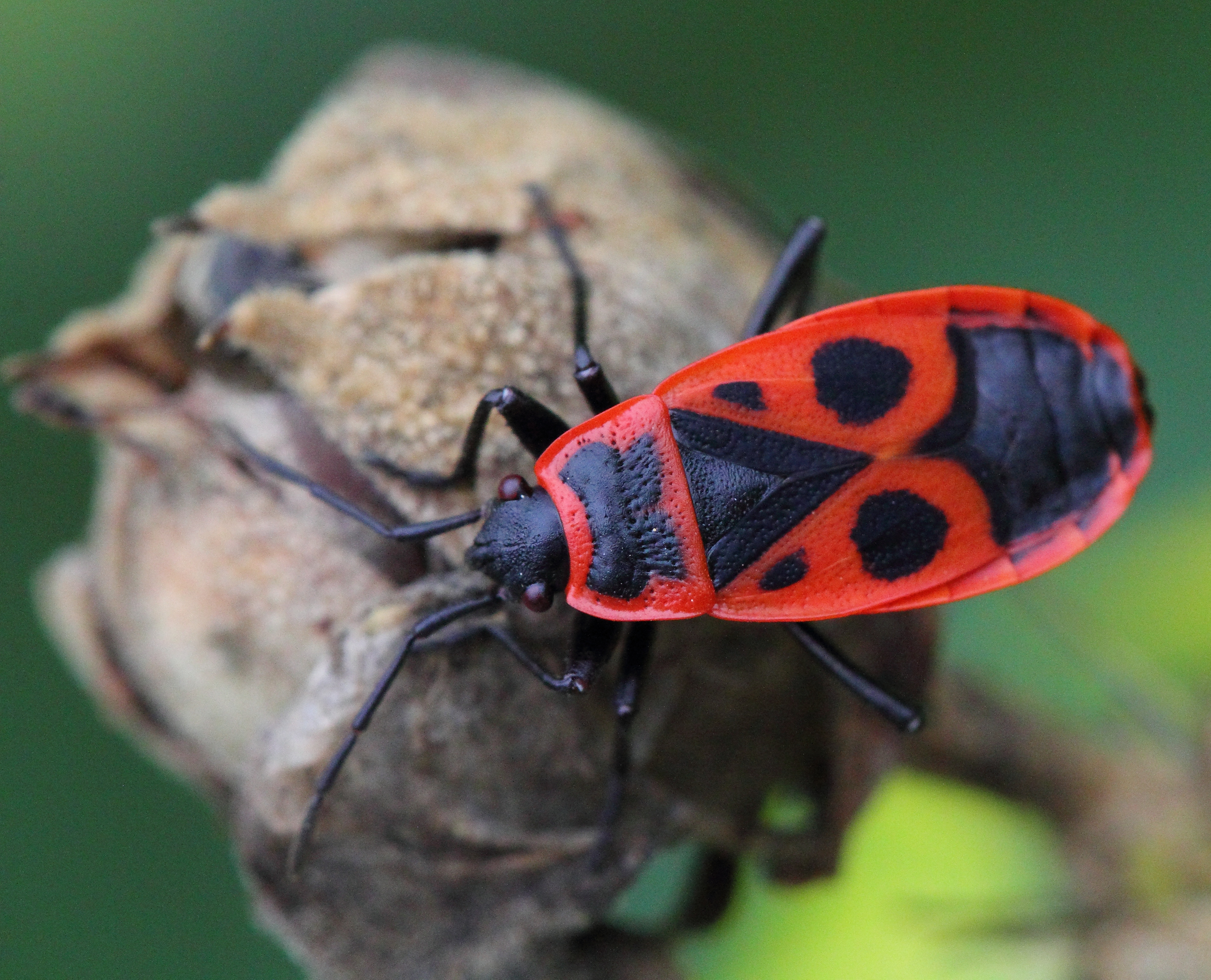
A firebug feeding on mallow seeds (Hibiscus syriacus).

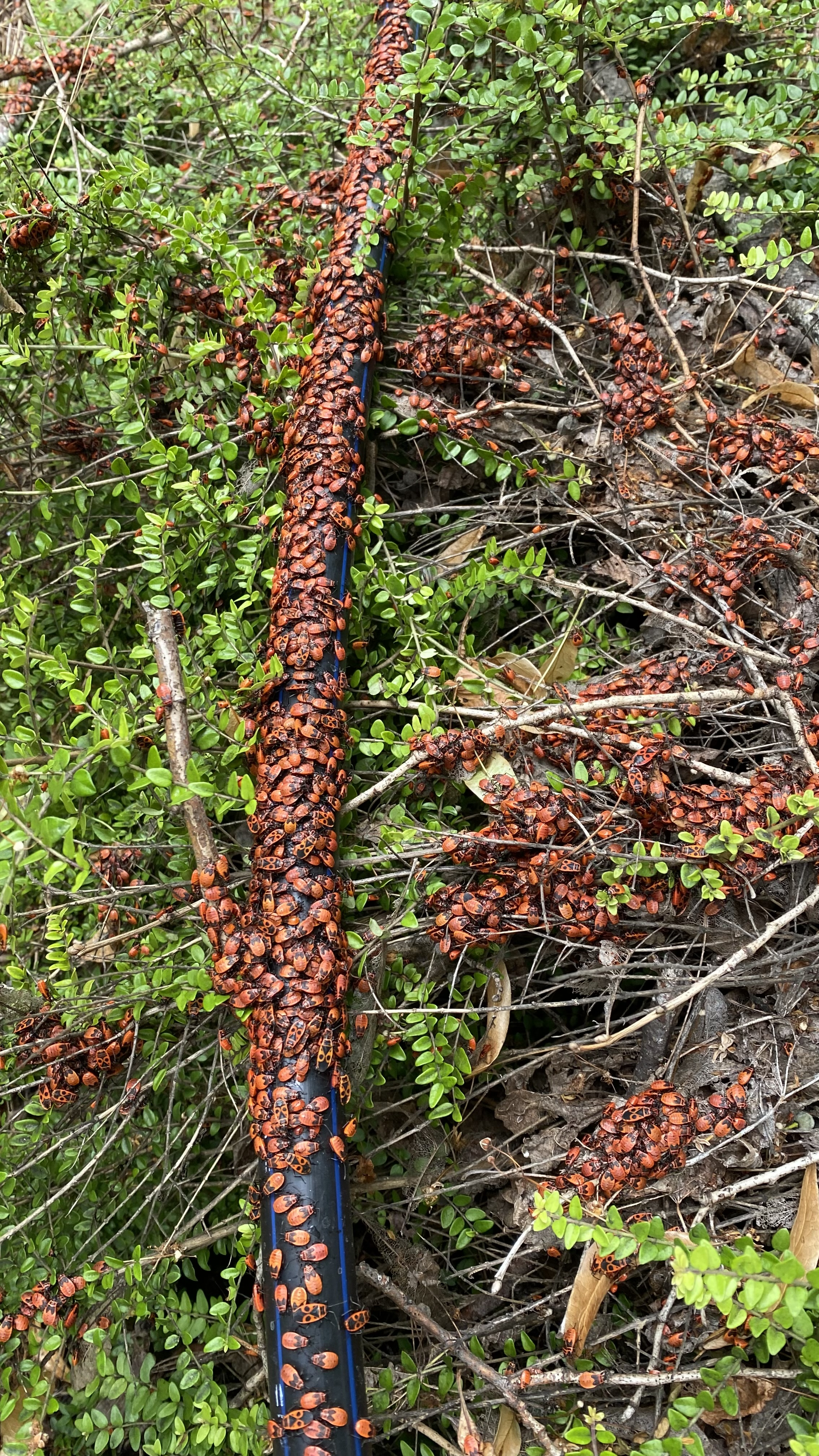
Firebugs on a water pipe in SW France

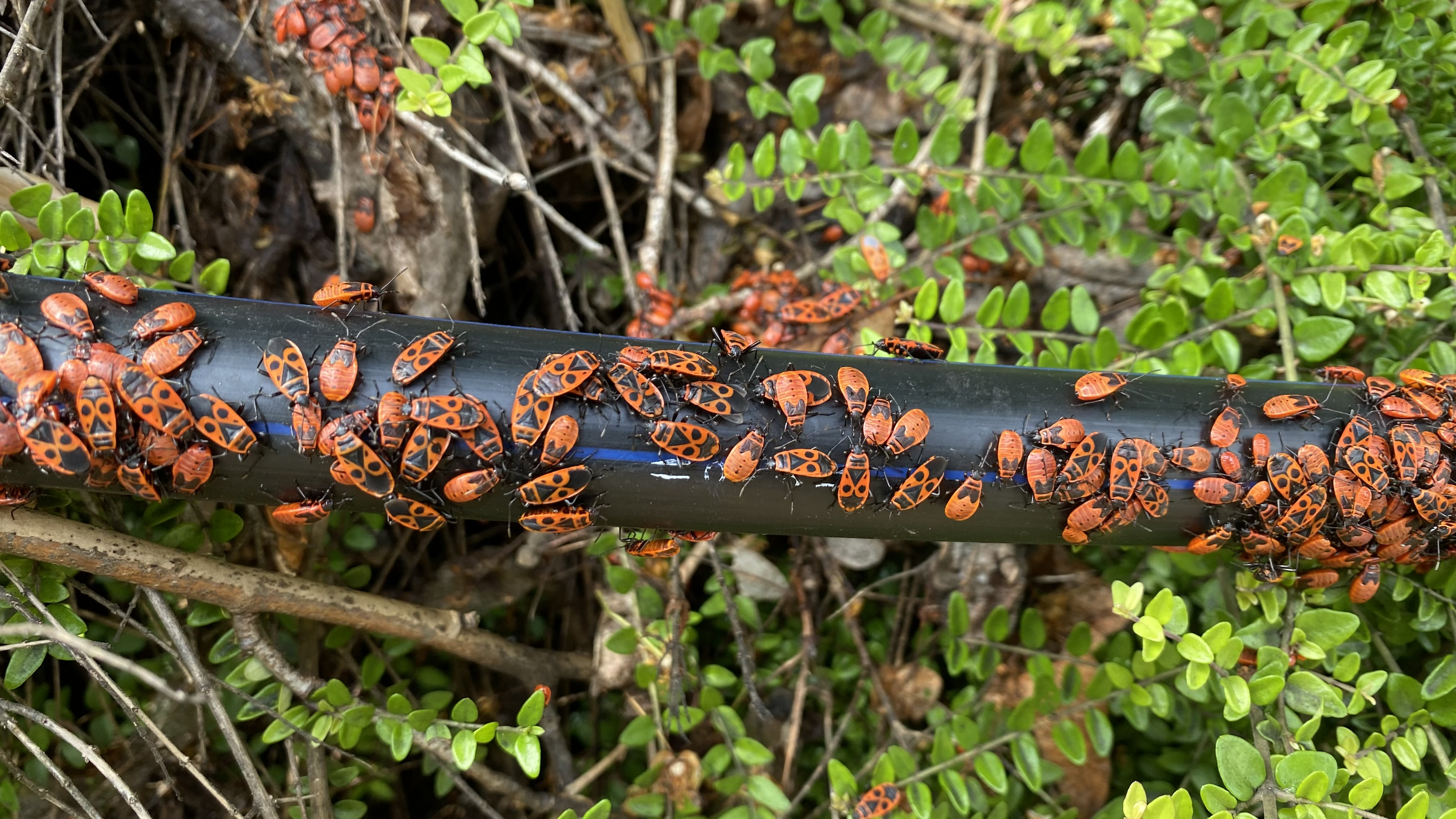
Firebugs on a water pipe in SW France

=== Possible confusion ===
Comparison of Pyrrhocoris and Corizus
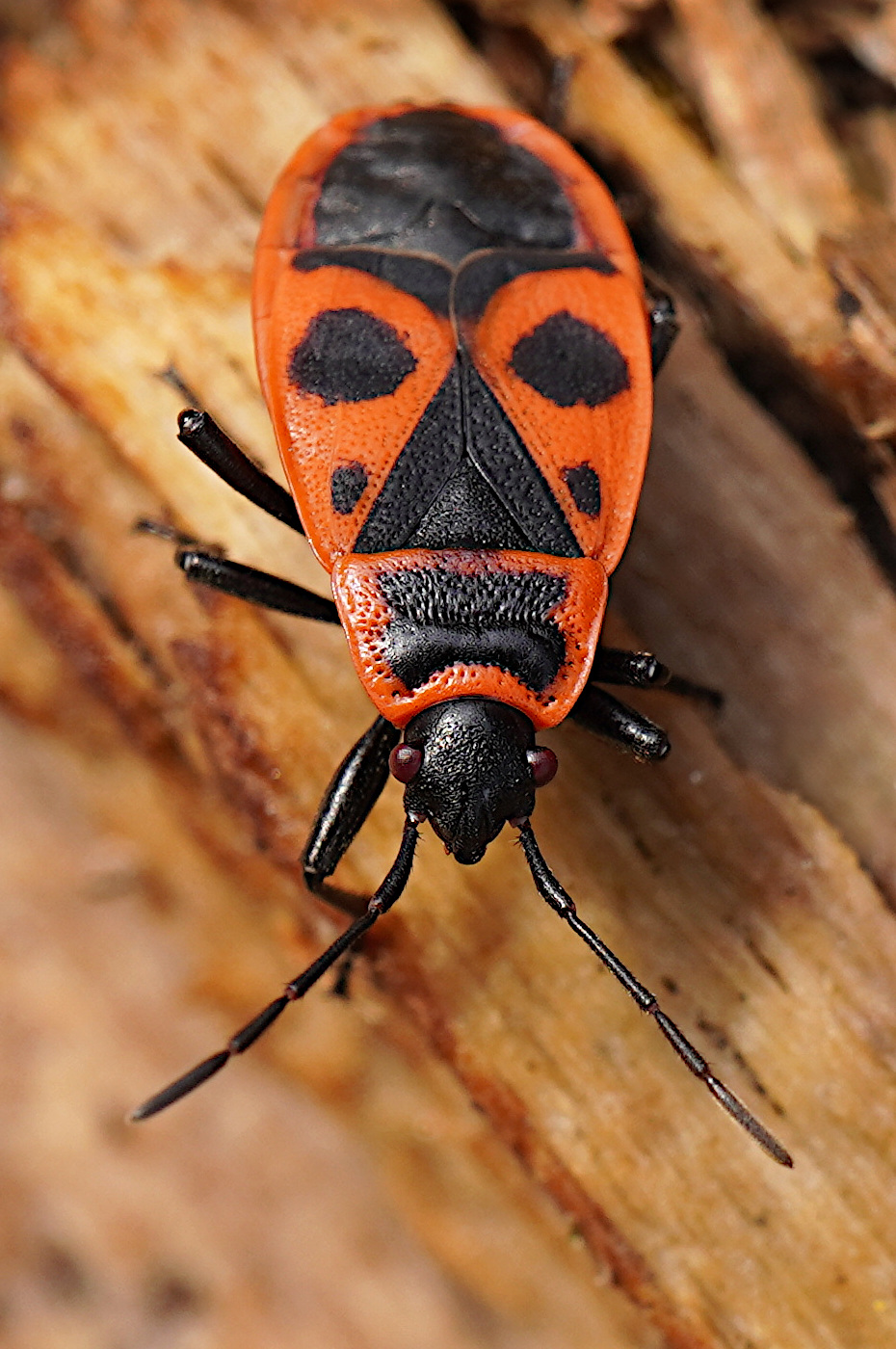
Pyrrhocoris apterus

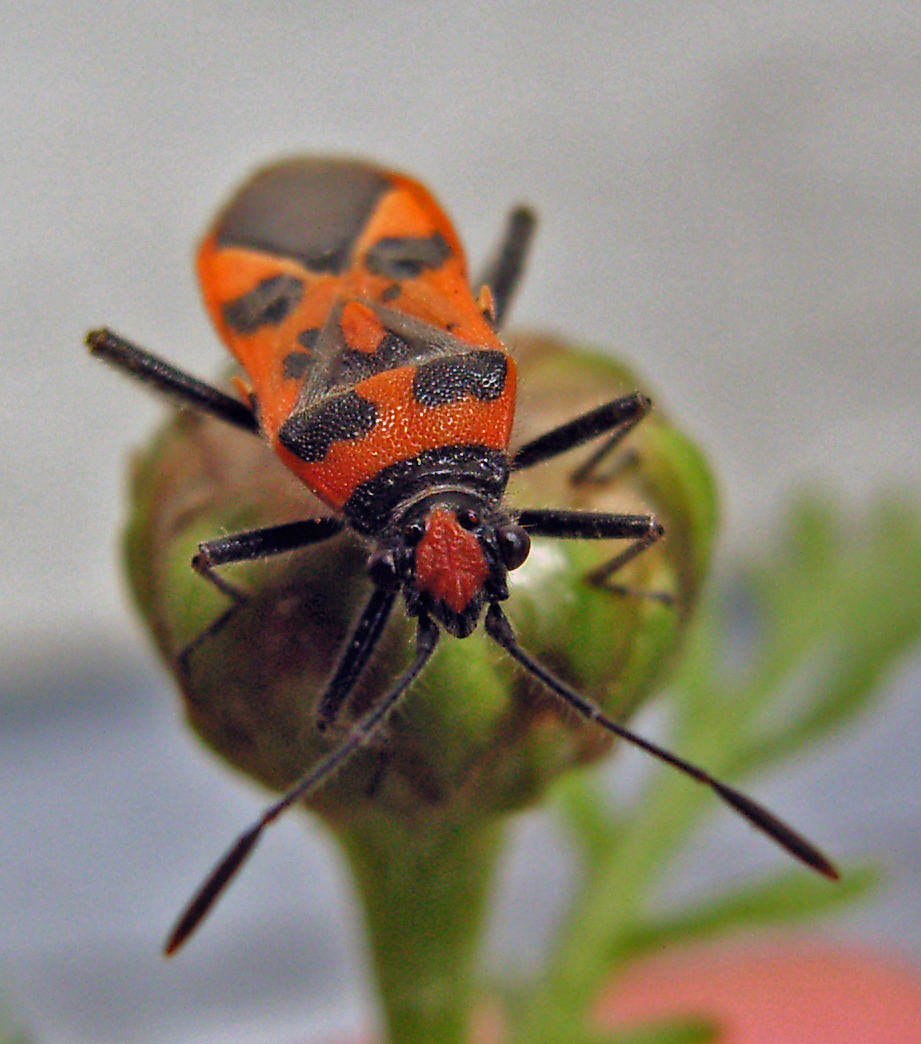
Corizus hyoscyami
