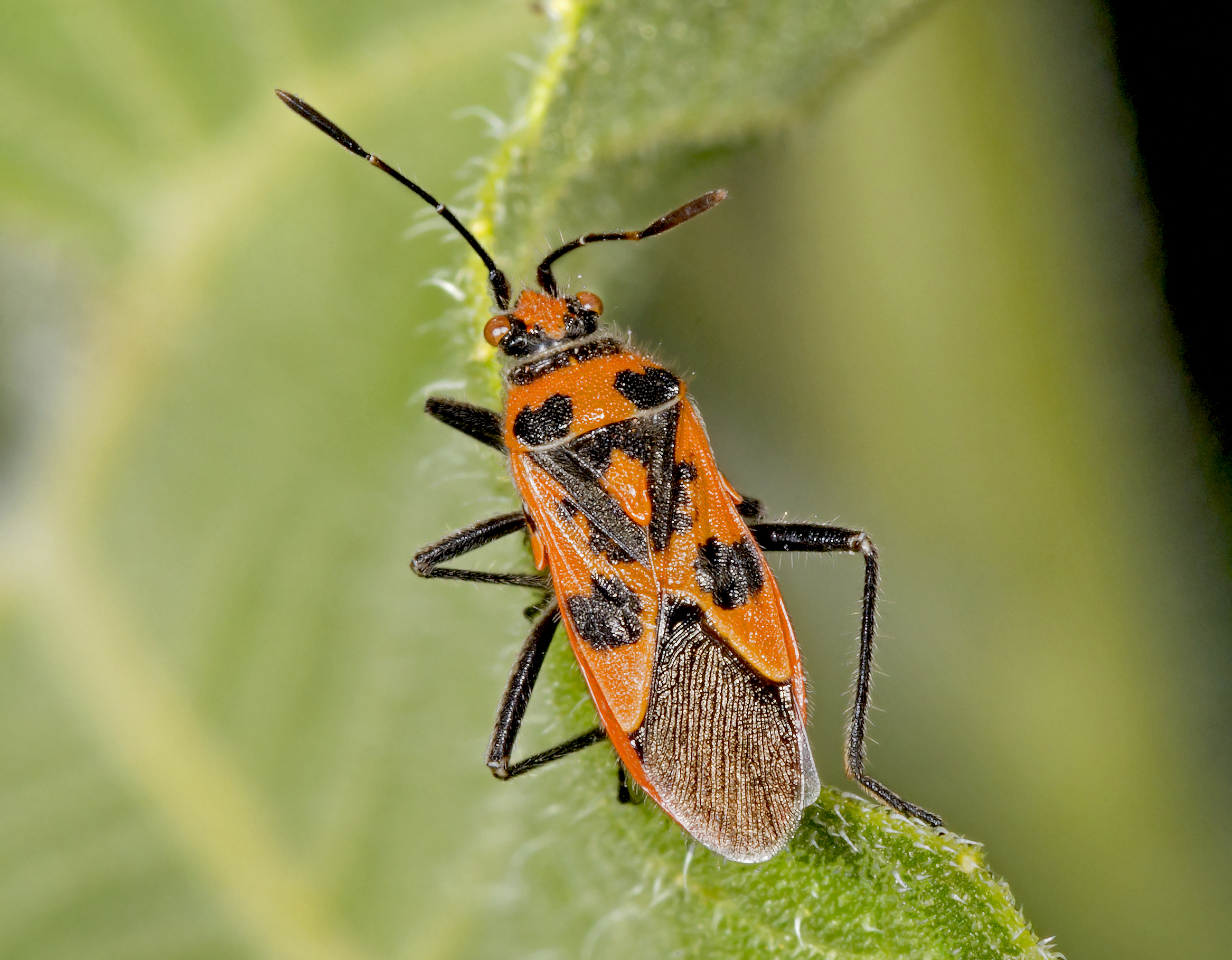
- Corizus hyoscyami

Scientific classification
- Kingdom: Animalia
- Phylum: Arthropoda
- Clade: Pancrustacea
- Class: Insecta
- Order: Hemiptera
- Suborder: Heteroptera
- Family: Rhopalidae
- Subfamily: Rhopalinae
- Tribe: Rhopalini
- Genus: Corizus; Fallén

Species
- Corizus altivolens; Corizus baluchistanensis; Corizus brevicornis; Corizus fenestella; Corizus hyoscyami; Corizus indicus; Corizus tetraspilus

= Corizus =

Genus of true bugs

Corizus is a genus of insects in the family Rhopalidae.
