= Cocoonase =

Enzyme produced by some silkworms

Cocoonase is a trypsin-like proteolytic enzyme produced by silkworms (of both Bombyx, Heliconius and Antheraea species) as they near the final stages of their metamorphosis. It is produced by cells in the proboscis and exuded onto the galeae. Its function is to weaken the fibers of the cocoon, thereby facilitating the emergence of the adult insect.

It was discovered by Carroll Williams.
