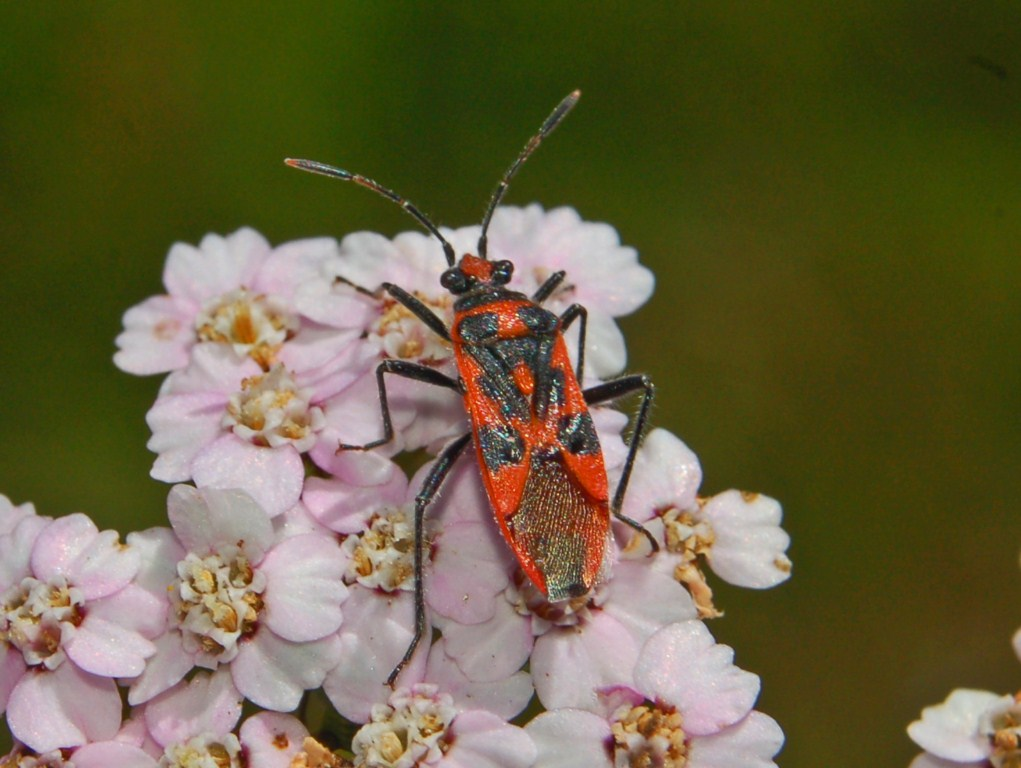
- Corizus hyoscyami hyoscyami
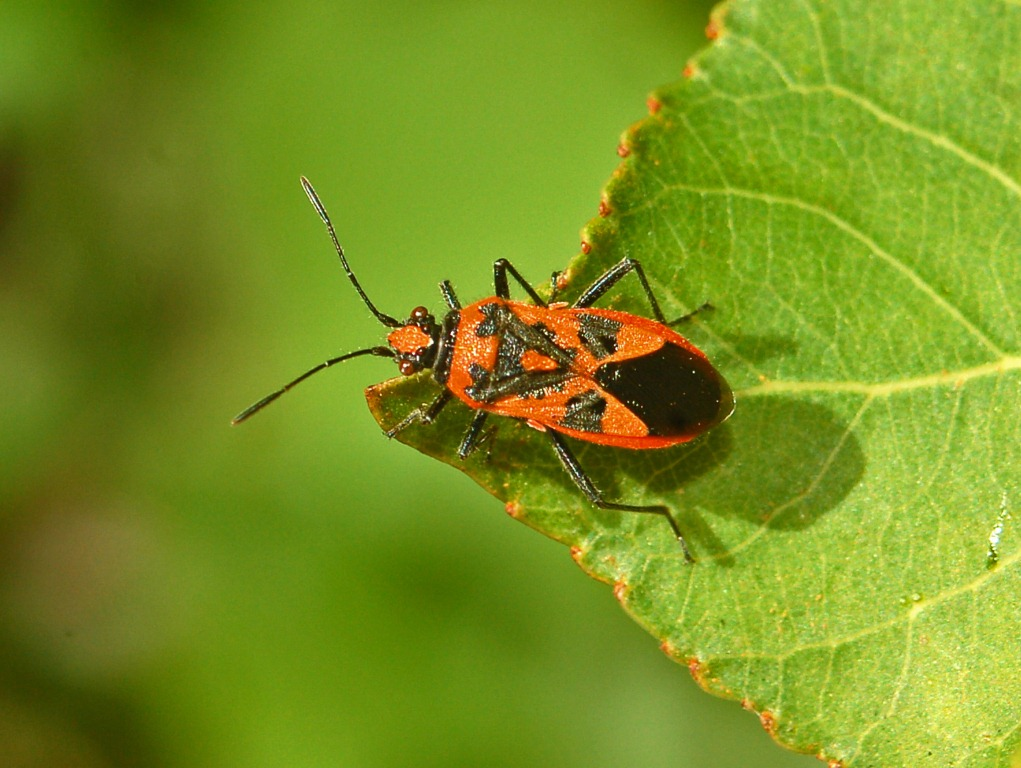
- Corizus hyoscyami nigridorsum

Scientific classification
- Kingdom: Animalia
- Phylum: Arthropoda
- Class: Insecta
- Order: Hemiptera
- Suborder: Heteroptera
- Family: Rhopalidae
- Genus: Corizus
- Species: C. hyoscyami

Binomial name
- Corizus hyoscyami (Linnaeus, 1758)

Subspecies
- Corizus hyoscyami hyoscyami (Linnaeus, 1758); Corizus hyoscyami nigridorsum (Puton, 1874)

= Corizus hyoscyami =

Species of true bug

Corizus hyoscyami is a species of scentless plant bug belonging to the family Rhopalidae, subfamily Rhopalinae. It is commonly called the cinnamon bug or black and red squash bug.

== Subspecies ==
- Corizus hyoscyami hyoscyami (Linnaeus, 1758)
- Corizus hyoscyami nigridorsum (Puton, 1874)

== Distribution ==
Corizus hyoscyami subs. hyoscyami is found in most of Europe; in Britain, the species appears to be spreading northwards, having been recorded in Yorkshire. Corizus hyoscyami subs. nigridorsum is present in Spain, Italy, Morocco and Tunisia.

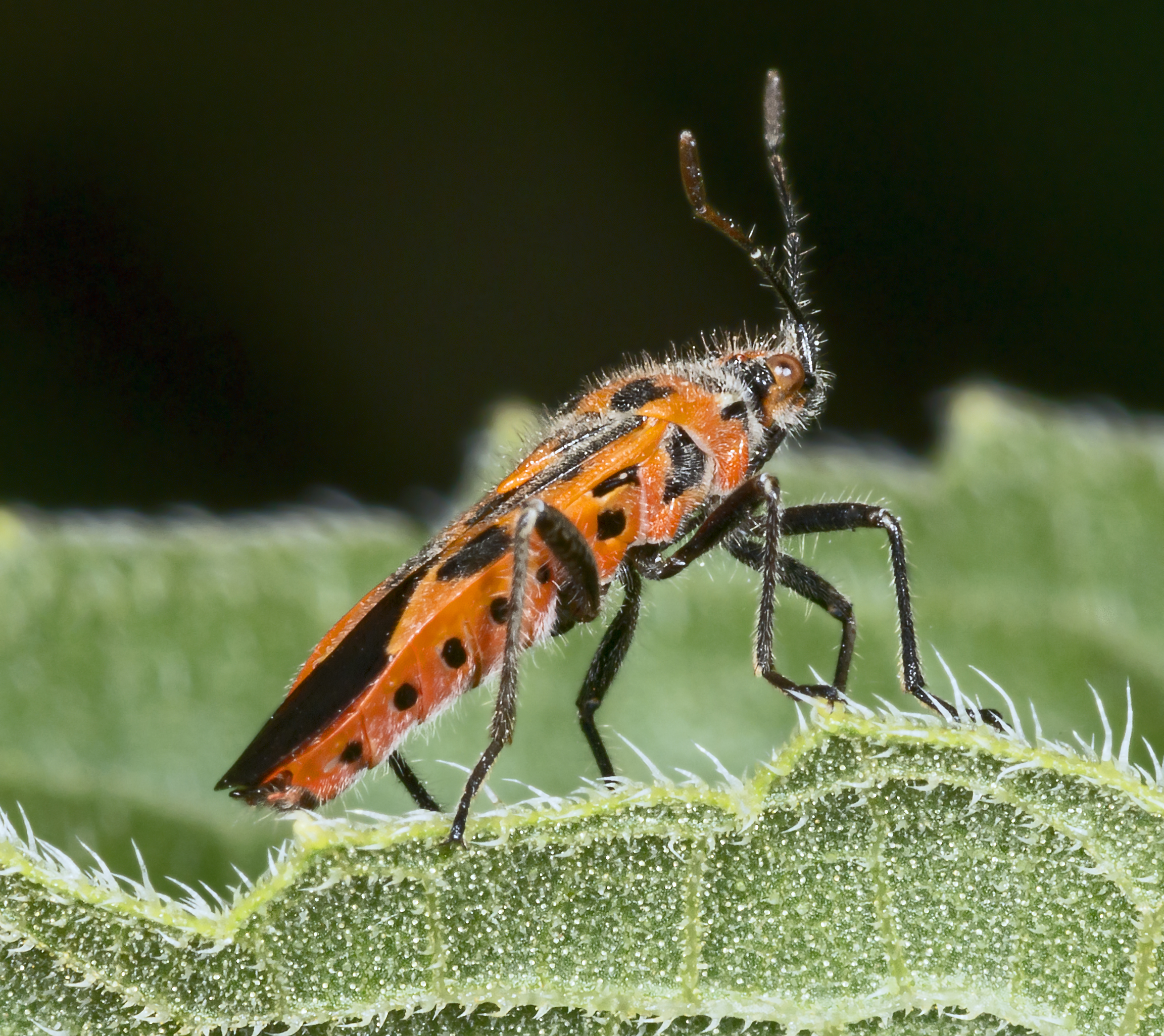
Lateral view

== Description ==
Adults of Corizus hyoscyami are about 9 millimetres (0.35 in) long. Like all scentless plant bugs, it lacks well-developed scent glands and can be distinguished by numerous veins in the membrane of the hemelytra, characteristic of all members of the Rhopalidae.

In Corizus hyoscyami subs. hyoscyami the third and fourth abdominal tergites are red, while in Corizus hyoscyami subs. nigridorsum they are completely black. The dorsum colours are visible in elitrale transparency under the membrane.

Although striking in colour, Corizus hyoscyami may be confused with the similarly marked but unrelated Pyrrhocoris apterus (firebug) (see comparison).

== Comparison of Pyrrhocoris and Corizus ==
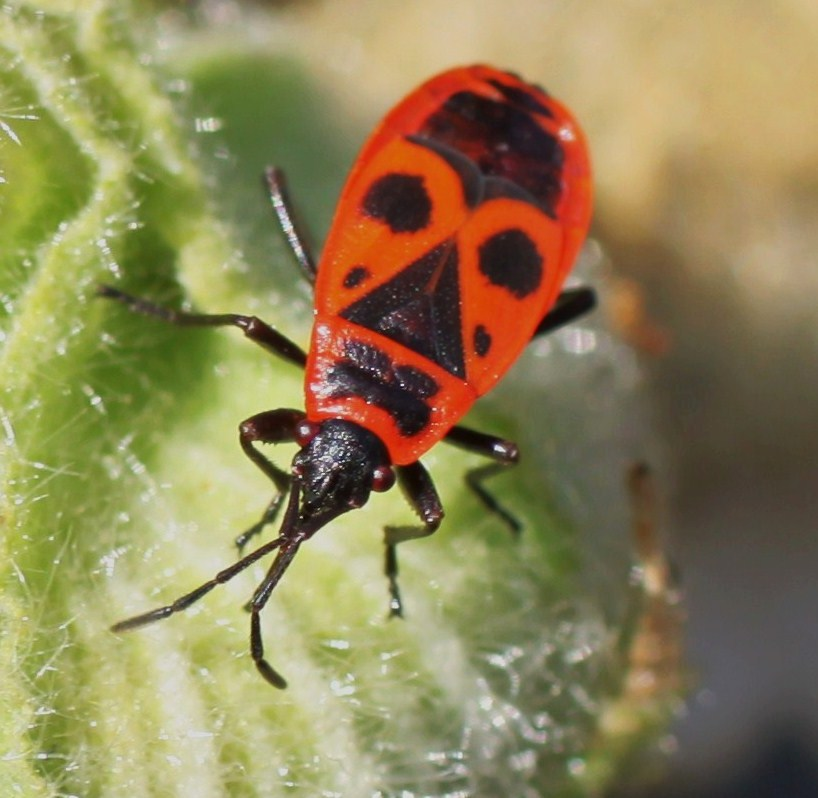
Pyrrhocoris apterus

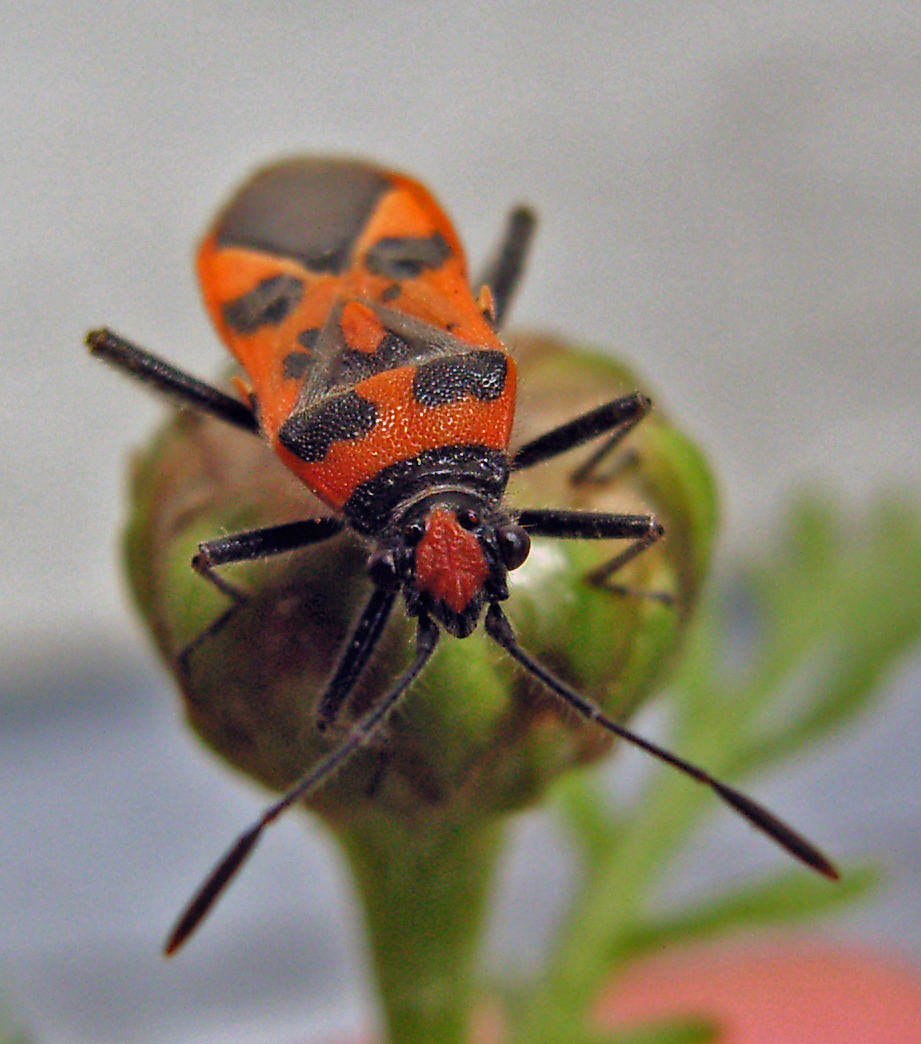
Corizus hyoscyami

== Biology ==
The species is a plant feeder on a wide range of plants. Adults can be found all year around. This species overwinters as an adult. The new generation appears in August–September.

Adult: All year

== Sources ==
- Dolling, W. R. (2006). "Superfamily Coreoidea: Corizus hyoscyami". In Aukema, Berend; Rieger, Christian (eds.). Catalogue of the Heteroptera of the Palaearctic Region. Vol. 5, Pentatomomorpha II. Amsterdam: Netherlands Entomological Society. pp. 12–13. ISBN 978-90-71912-28-3.
