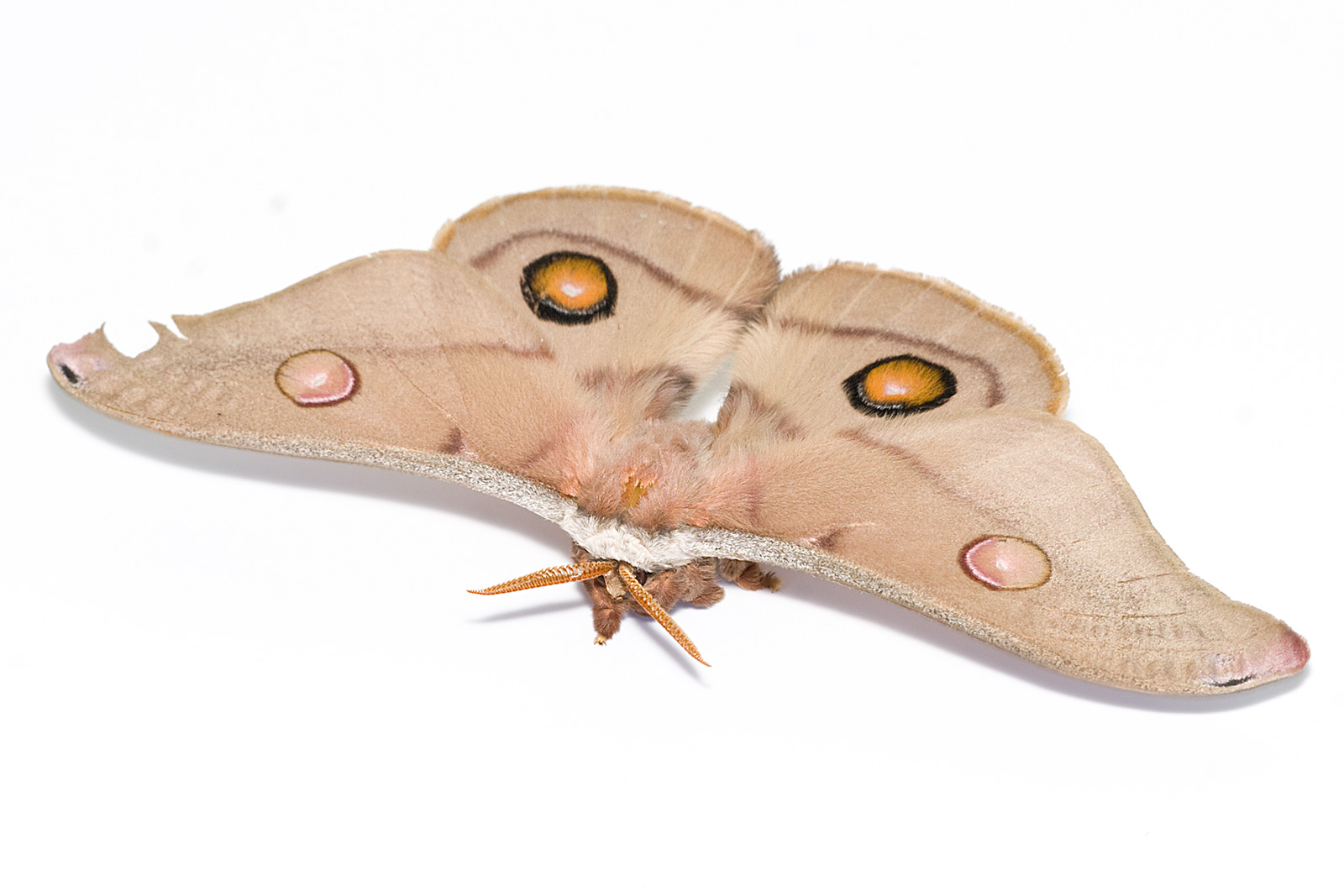
- A female emperor gum moth

Scientific classification
- Kingdom: Animalia
- Phylum: Arthropoda
- Clade: Pancrustacea
- Class: Insecta
- Order: Lepidoptera
- Family: Saturniidae
- Genus: Opodiphthera
- Species: O. eucalypti

Binomial name
- Opodiphthera eucalypti (Scott, 1864)

Synonyms
- Antheraea eucalypti Scott, 1864; Austrocaligula eucalypti (Scott, 1864)

= Opodiphthera eucalypti =

Species of moth

Opodiphthera eucalypti, the emperor gum moth, is a species of moth in the family Saturniidae native to Australia. This species was formerly placed in the genus Antheraea.

== Distribution ==
The emperor gum moth may inhabit all states of Australia, however it is scarce in the more southerly states where the climate is less suitable. They are also found as an introduced species on both the North and South Islands of New Zealand.

=== Caterpillars ===
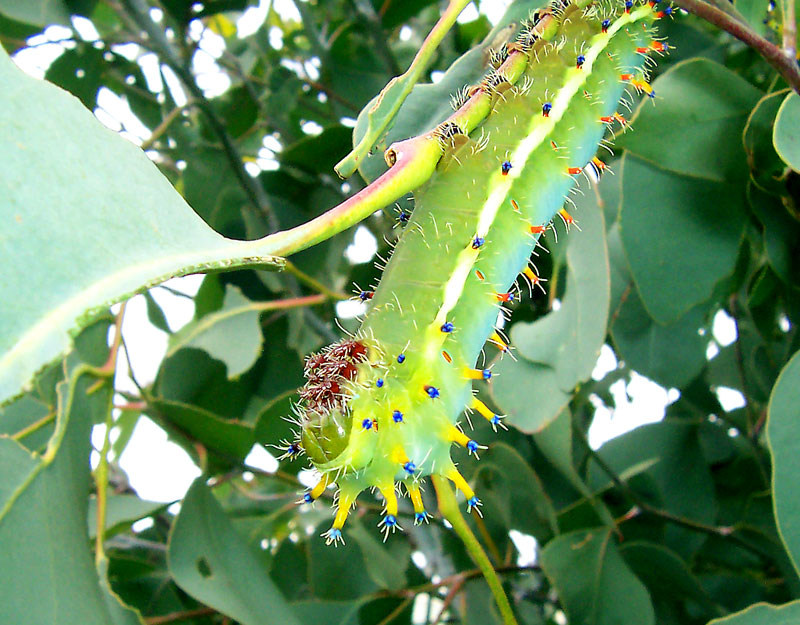
The caterpillar of the emperor gum moth in its last stage before pupation

Caterpillars can usually be found on young adult leaves between October and March (the Australian Spring and Summer). When the caterpillars hatch they are black with short hairs on top of small nodes on their bodies called tubercles. The hairs are not poisonous and will not sting. As the caterpillars mature they change color each time they shed their skin (which totals to five stages in the caterpillar's appearance). The fully grown caterpillars are usually found on the highest branches of the host tree where the leaves are the youngest and easiest to digest. By the final stage before pupation the caterpillars have developed striking coloration, having a yellow/cream stripe down their bright green/blue body and nodes of red and blue. Despite this they are still surprisingly hard to spot. The caterpillar stage in the emperor gum moth's life cycle can last for many weeks, depending on the temperature and weather conditions.

=== Cocoon ===
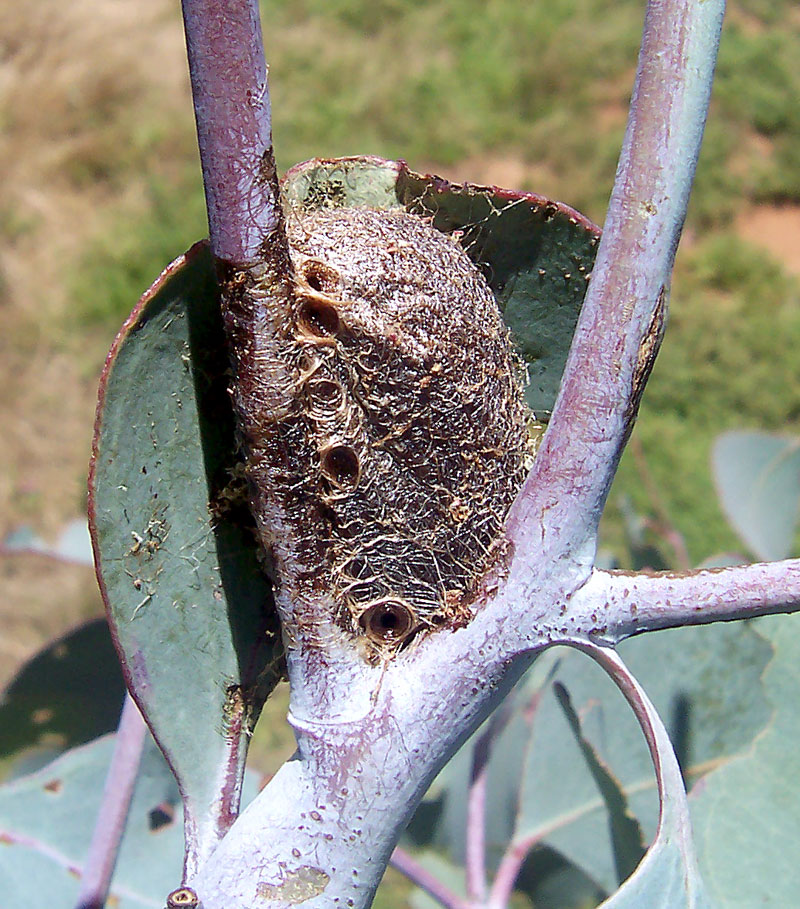
The emperor gum moth in its tough brown cocoon

When the caterpillar is fully mature it spins a dark brown silken cocoon on a branch which usually has a leaf to protect it with. When spinning is complete, the caterpillar sheds its final skin and takes the form of its pupal life stage. Within a day of spinning completion, the cocoon sets to a hard waterproof shell with a rough exterior and a smooth interior wall. Air holes can be seen along the side of the cocoon indicating that the cocoon is probably otherwise airtight. The moth usually emerges from the cocoon the following year, in spring or early summer.

When the metamorphosis is complete, the adult moth regurgitates a fluid to soften the tough cocoon and then cuts a hole using sharp hooks on the base of each forewing. The effort to release itself from the cocoon is vital for its wings to expand and dry after emerging. Pupae cut from the cocoon will hatch, but the moths' wings will never expand.

=== Adult moths ===
The emperor gum moth does not feed after it emerges from the cocoon, relying solely on the energy it stored as a caterpillar. Their adult life span is limited to a couple of weeks in which they mate, lay eggs and die. The moths, like the caterpillars, are very striking in appearance. The emperor gum moth is a very large moth, having a wingspan of 120 to 150 mm. Females are generally larger than males. The furry wings and body are multi-colored, but are in overall tones of pale reddish/brown. The wings are decorated with four prominent ‘eyes’ and various other markings in a symmetrical formation. The antennae of the males are feathery, while the females' are thinner and with fewer hairs.

== Biological significance ==
This insect was the first used in the successful development of continuous insect cell cultures. Dr. Thomas D. C. Grace, a researcher with CSIRO, developed four cell lines from the ovaries of this insect and reported on them in 1962. This was a significant breakthrough since efforts to grow insect cells in culture had been attempted for decades previously. Modifications of the medium used in these efforts, Grace's insect medium, is still in use today for growing many of the insect cell lines that have since been developed (approximately 600 distinct cell lines from more than 125 insect species).

== Additional images ==
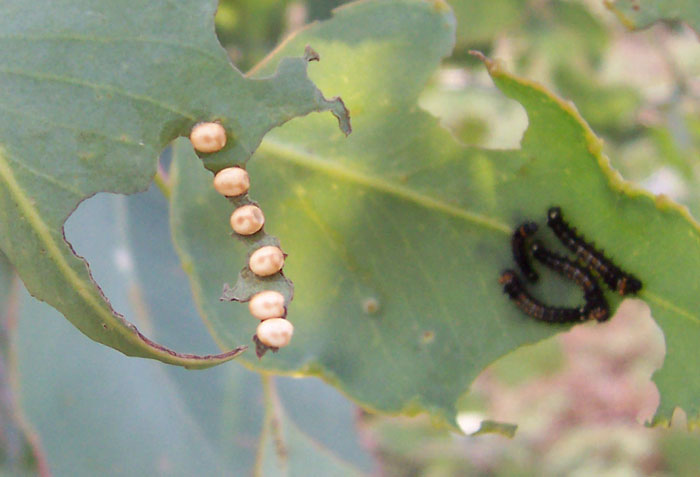
Eggs after the caterpillars have hatched

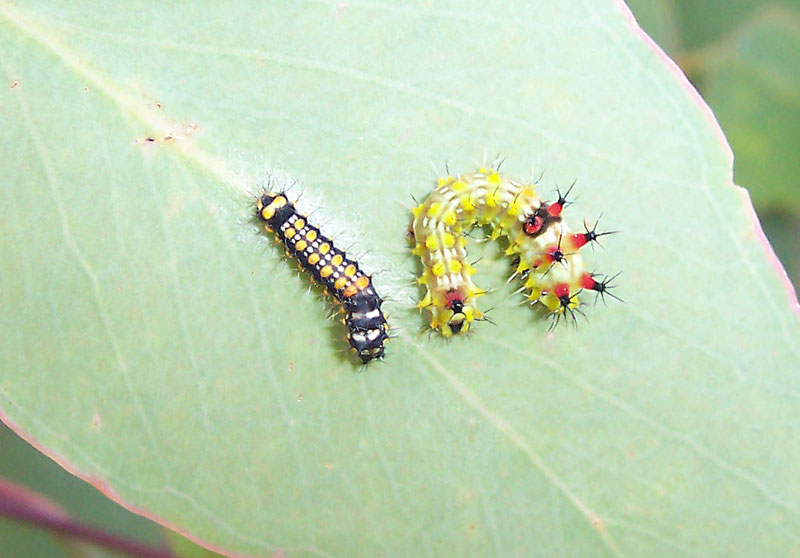
Caterpillars at second and third stages in their growth

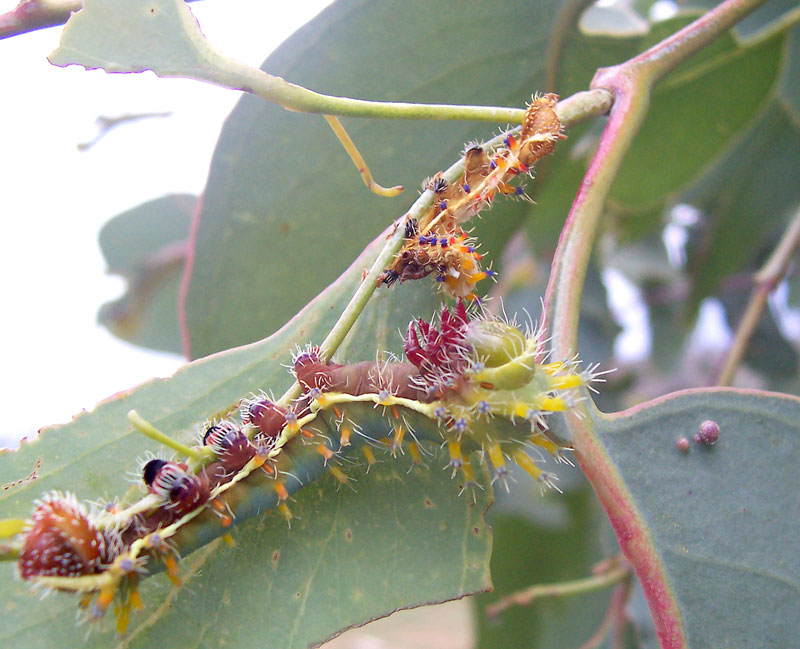
Caterpillar at fourth stage of growth. Its recently shed third stage skin is visible beside it

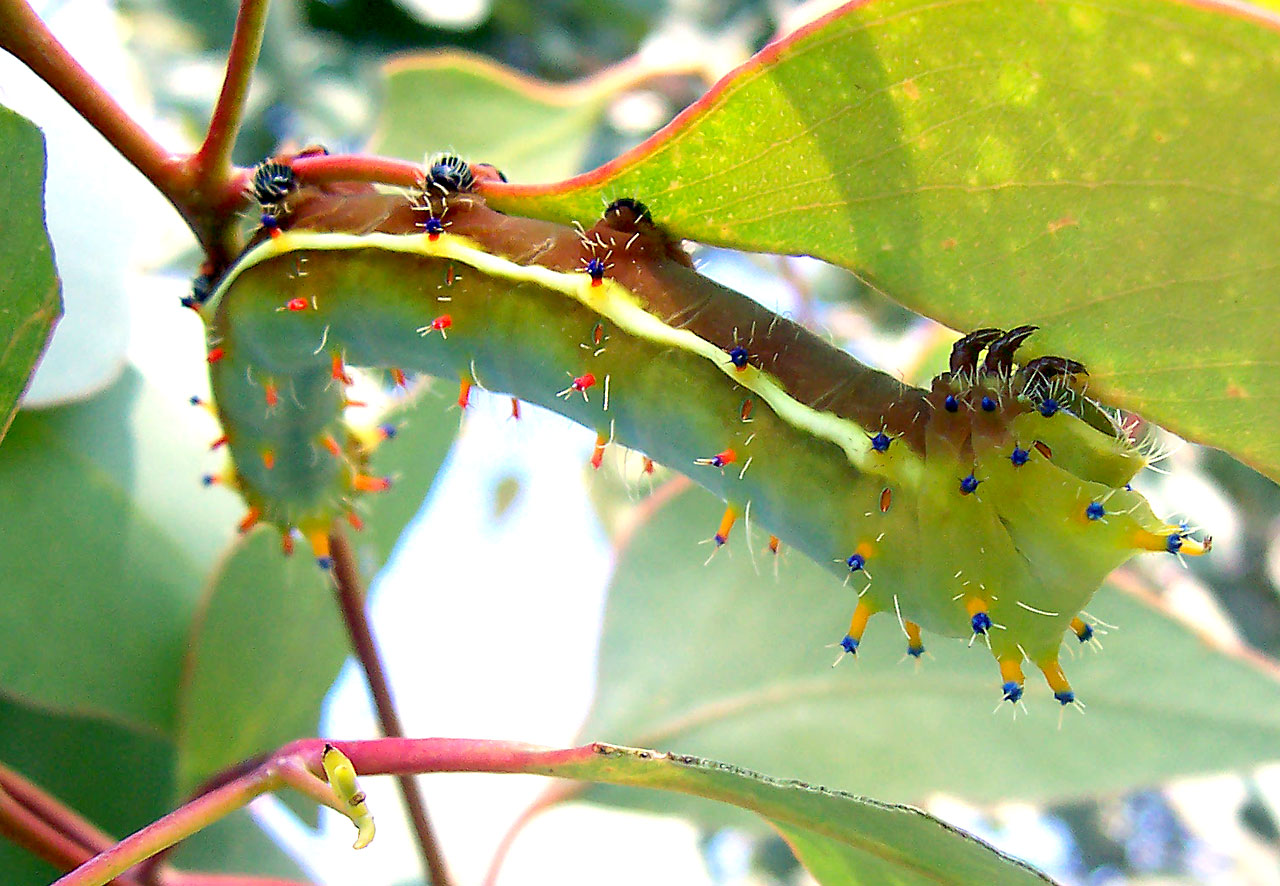
Caterpillar feeding on a eucalyptus leaf

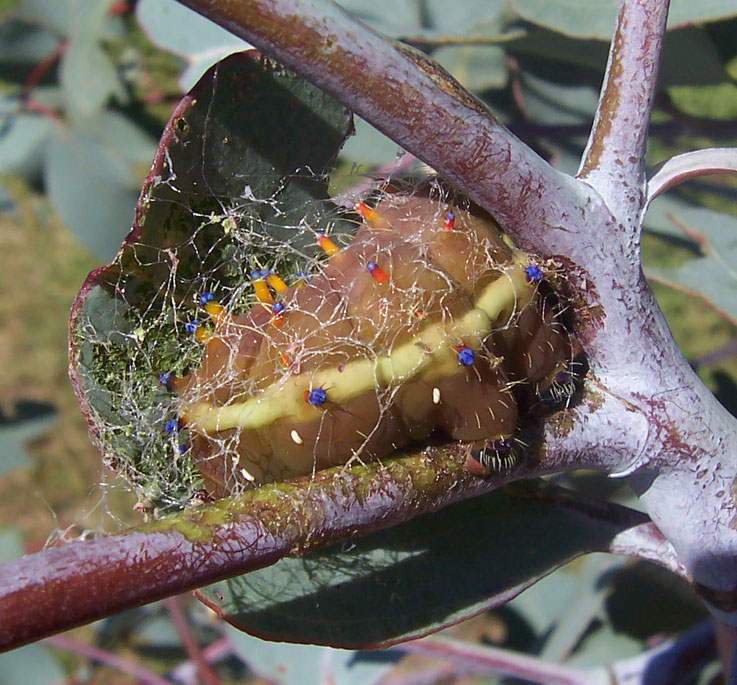
Caterpillar spinning its silken cocoon on a eucalyptus twig

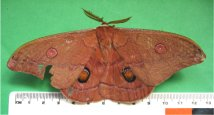
Proof of WA sighting. Taken 10 Nov 2007 in Albany WA

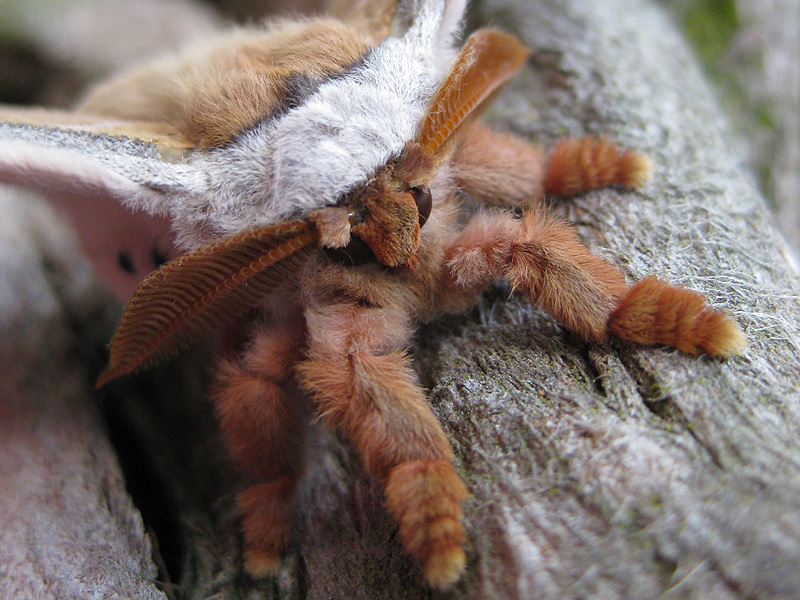
An adult male emperor gum moth

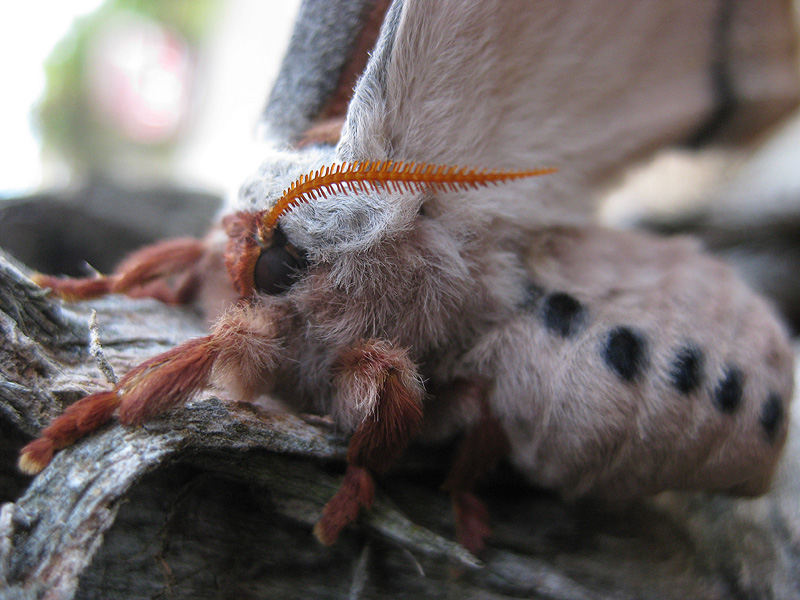
An adult female emperor gum moth

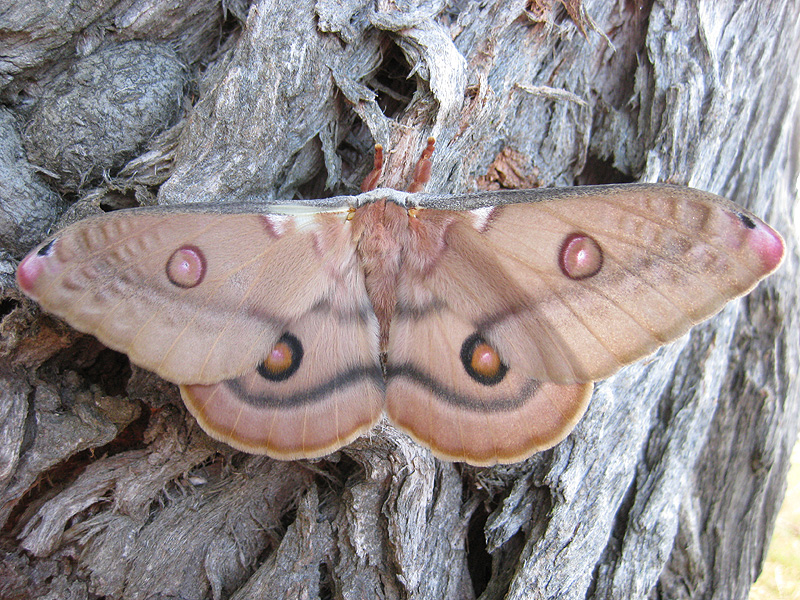
An adult emperor gum moth
