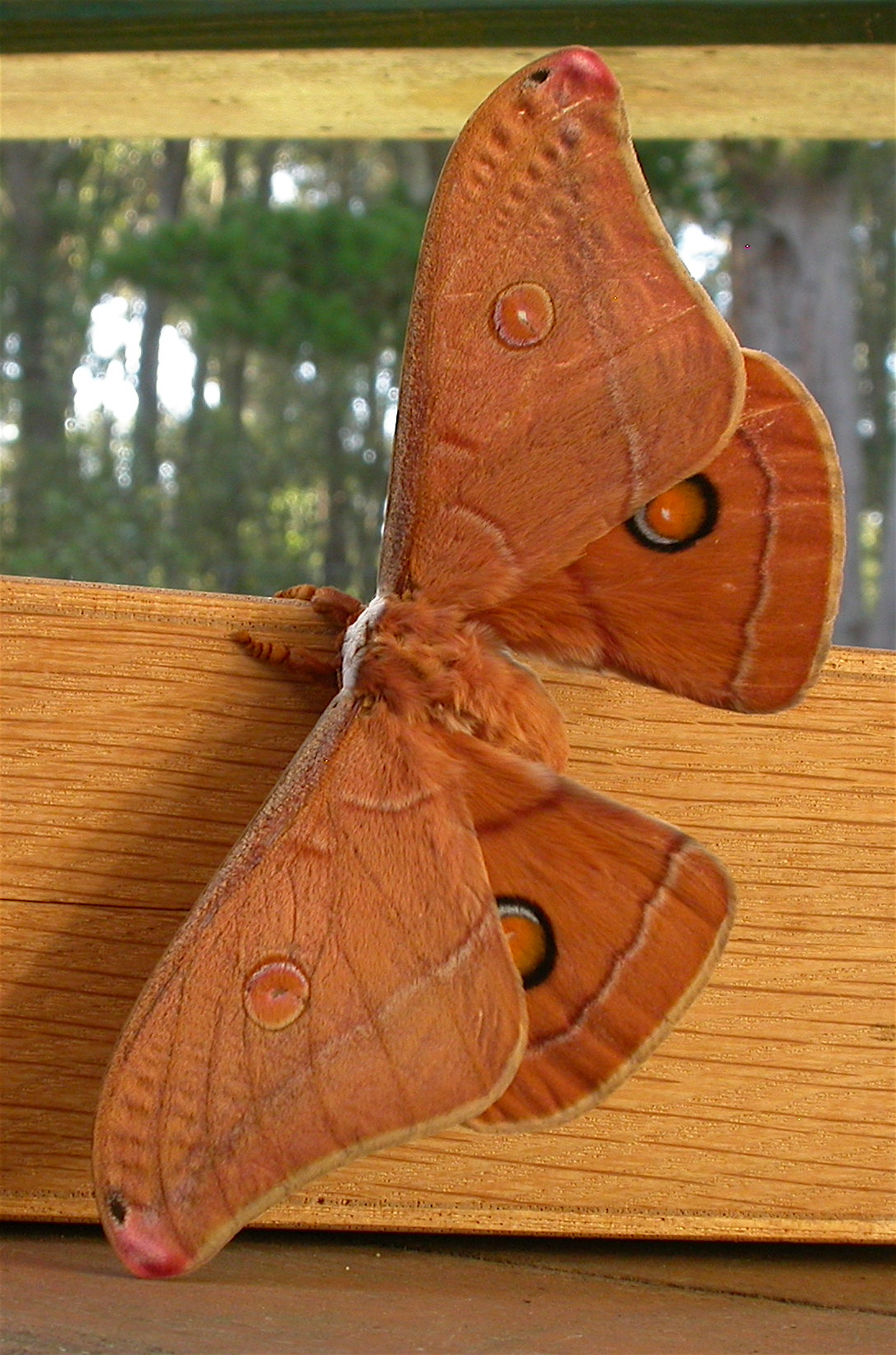

Scientific classification
- Domain: Eukaryota
- Kingdom: Animalia
- Phylum: Arthropoda
- Class: Insecta
- Order: Lepidoptera
- Family: Saturniidae
- Genus: Opodiphthera
- Species: O. helena

Binomial name
- Opodiphthera helena White, 1843

Synonyms
- Antheraea intermedia

= Opodiphthera helena =

Species of moth

Opodiphthera helena, the Helena gum moth, is a moth in the family Saturniidae. It is found along the eastern coast of Australia.

The wingspan is 130–170 mm (5.1–6.7 in).

The larvae feed on Eucalyptus species.
