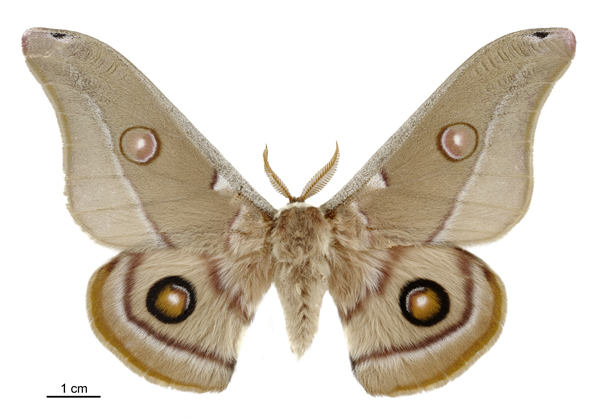
- male O. eucalypti

Scientific classification
- Kingdom: Animalia
- Phylum: Arthropoda
- Clade: Pancrustacea
- Class: Insecta
- Order: Lepidoptera
- Family: Saturniidae
- Tribe: Saturniini
- Genus: Opodiphthera; Wallengren, 1858

Species
- See text

= Opodiphthera =

Genus of moths

Opodiphthera is a genus of moths from the family Saturniidae that are endemic to Australia.

Opodiphthera makes up the majority of Australia's saturniid moths. The genus contains the emperor gum moth (O. eucalypti), one of Australia's most renowned moths.

== Species ==
- Opodiphthera astrophela Walker, 1855
- Opodiphthera carnea (Sonthonnax, 1899)
- Opodiphthera engaea Turner, 1922
- Opodiphthera eucalypti Scott, 1864
- Opodiphthera excavus Lane, 1995
- Opodiphthera fervida Jordan, 1910
- Opodiphthera helena (White, 1843)
- Opodiphthera jurriaansei Van Eecke, 1933
- Opodiphthera loranthi Lucas, 1891
- Opodiphthera rhythmica (Turner, 1936)
- Opodiphthera saccopoea (Turner, 1924)
- Opodiphthera sulphurea Lane & Naumann, 2003
