= Juvabione =

Names
- Preferred IUPAC name Methyl (4R)-4-[(2R)-6-methyl-4-oxoheptan-2-yl]cyclohex-1-ene-1-carboxylate

Identifiers
CAS Number	17904-27-7
3D model (JSmol)	Interactive image; Interactive image
ChemSpider	390830
PubChem CID	442381
UNII	NG8LD2D5B4
CompTox Dashboard (EPA)	DTXSID30858798
- InChI: InChI=1S/C16H26O3/c1-11(2)9-15(17)10-12(3)13-5-7-14(8-6-13)16(18)19-4/h7,11-13H,5-6,8-10H2,1-4H3/t12-,13+/m1/s1 Key: IIWNDLDEVPJIBT-OLZOCXBDSA-N; InChI=1/C16H26O3/c1-11(2)9-15(17)10-12(3)13-5-7-14(8-6-13)16(18)19-4/h7,11-13H,5-6,8-10H2,1-4H3/t12-,13+/m1/s1 Key: IIWNDLDEVPJIBT-OLZOCXBDBI
- SMILES: O=C(C[C@@H](C)[C@]1([H])CCC(C(OC)=O)=CC1)CC(C)C; C[C@H](CC(=O)CC(C)C)[C@@H]1CCC(=CC1)C(=O)OC

Properties
Chemical formula	C_{16}H_{26}O_{3}
Molar mass	266.381 g·mol^{−1}
- Except where otherwise noted, data are given for materials in their standard state (at 25 °C [77 °F], 100 kPa). verify (what is ?) Infobox references

Juvabione, historically known as the paper factor, is the methyl ester of todomatuic acid. Both are sesquiterpenes (C_{15}) found in the wood of true firs of the genus Abies. They occur naturally as part of a mixture of sesquiterpenes based upon the bisabolane scaffold. Sesquiterpenes of this family are known as insect juvenile hormone analogues (IJHA) because of their ability to mimic juvenile activity in order to stifle insect reproduction and growth. These compounds play important roles in conifers as the second line of defense against insect induced trauma and fungal pathogens.

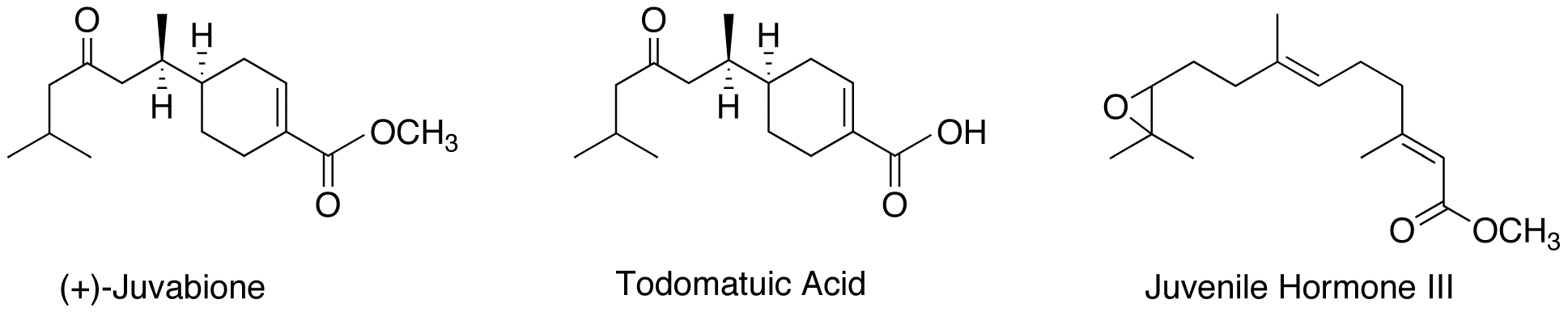

== History ==
In 1965, Karel Sláma and Carroll Williams made a surprising discovery: paper towels made from the wood of the balsam fir (Abies balsamea, Fig. 1) released vapors that elicited a potent effect on hemipteran bugs of the Pyrrhocoridae family. They named this substance "the paper factor." It was thought to contain a mixture of JH-mimicking sesquiterpenes, but it wasn't until 1966 that (+)-juvabione was first isolated as an active component from the balsam fir by Bowers.

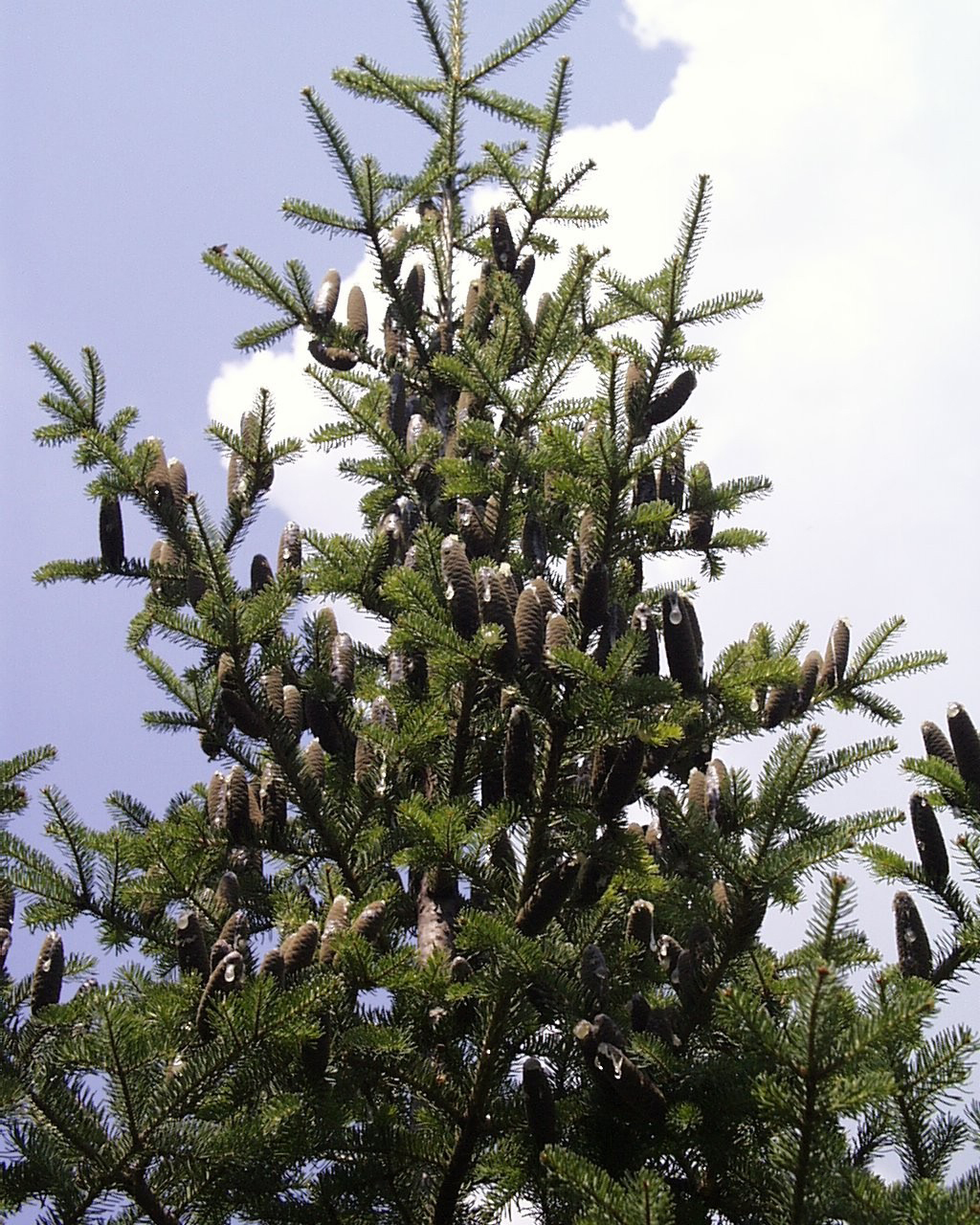

Figure 1. Abies balsamea

== Induction of sesquiterpene biosynthesis in conifers ==
Insect herbivores such as bark beetles and their symbiotic fungal pathogens, pose as one of the greatest threats to conifer survival. When they feed on conifers, the subsequent wounds trigger a signaling cascade that results in the production of terpene synthases of many types, (Note: Examples include: Myrcene synthase, pinene synthase, and taxadiene synthase) all of which arise from the terpene synthase gene cluster known as Tpsd. Induced gene expression is tightly regulated and time-dependent. Immediately after insect attack, toxic monoterpenes are released. These provide a volatile solvent for the diterpene resins so that successive evaporation leaves a barrier that seals the wound site.

The transcription of sesquiterpene synthases was shown to begin on the third day following insect attack. Sesquiterpenoid JHAs continue to be produced up to twelve days later to prevent further insect reproduction. The first sesquiterpene to be formed, (E)-α-bisabolene (formed by (E)-α-bisabolene synthase), can be further transformed into juvabione and todomatuic acid.

== Biosynthesis of (+)-juvabione and (+)-todomatuic acid ==
Sesquiterpenes are a class of terpenoids based upon a 15-carbon unit scaffold synthesized from isoprene units via the mevalonate pathway (Fig. 2). In this pathway, two molecules of acetyl-CoA undergo a condensation reaction to give acetoacetyl-CoA. This product then condenses with third molecule of acetyl-CoA in a stereospecific fashion to form 3-hydroxy-3-methylglutaryl-CoA (HMG-CoA) which then is reduced to mevalonic acid (MVA). A series of ATP-dependent transformations lead to a key isoprene unit, isopentenyl diphosphate (IPP) which can be isomerized to dimethylallyl diphosphate (DMAPP). DMAPP ionizes to its respective allylic cation that undergoes electrophilic addition to the double bond of IPP. Upon loss of a proton, geranyl diphosphate (GPP) is formed. GPP undergoes an elimination reaction to form its corresponding allylic cation. Electrophilic addition of another IPP unit to the GPP cation results in a tertiary carbocation intermediate that forms a fifteen-carbon farnesyl diphosphate (FPP) upon loss of a proton.

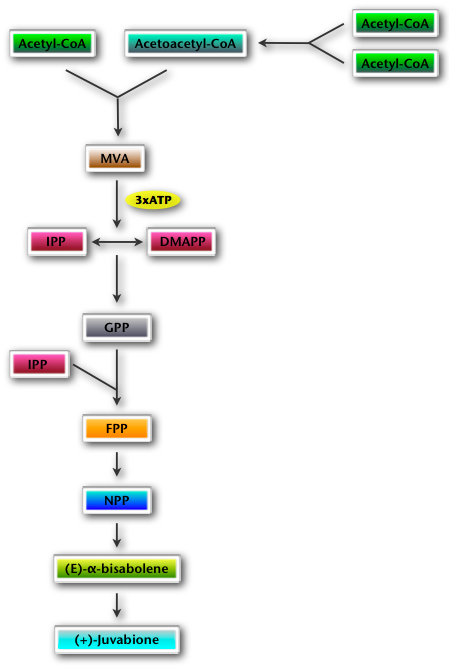

Figure 2. Generalized pathway for the synthesis of sesquiterpenes.

Farnesyl diphosphate is the universal precursor to a wide variety of linear and cyclized sesquiterpenes. Of particular interest to juvabione biosynthesis (Scheme 1), dissociation of the terminal diphosphate from the FPP precursor generates the (E,E)-farnesyl allylic cation, leading to nerolidyl diphosphate (NPP). NPP is another precursor that can undergo different reaction types, but in this case, bisabolene synthase directs a single cyclization event by electrophilic attack of C-1 onto the double bond of C-6 to form a six-membered ring. Deprotonation of the resultant tertiary cation yields (E)-α-bisabolene. Currently, the mechanistic details describing the conversion of (E)-α-bisabolene to (+)-juvabione and (+)-todomatuic acid have not been fully described.

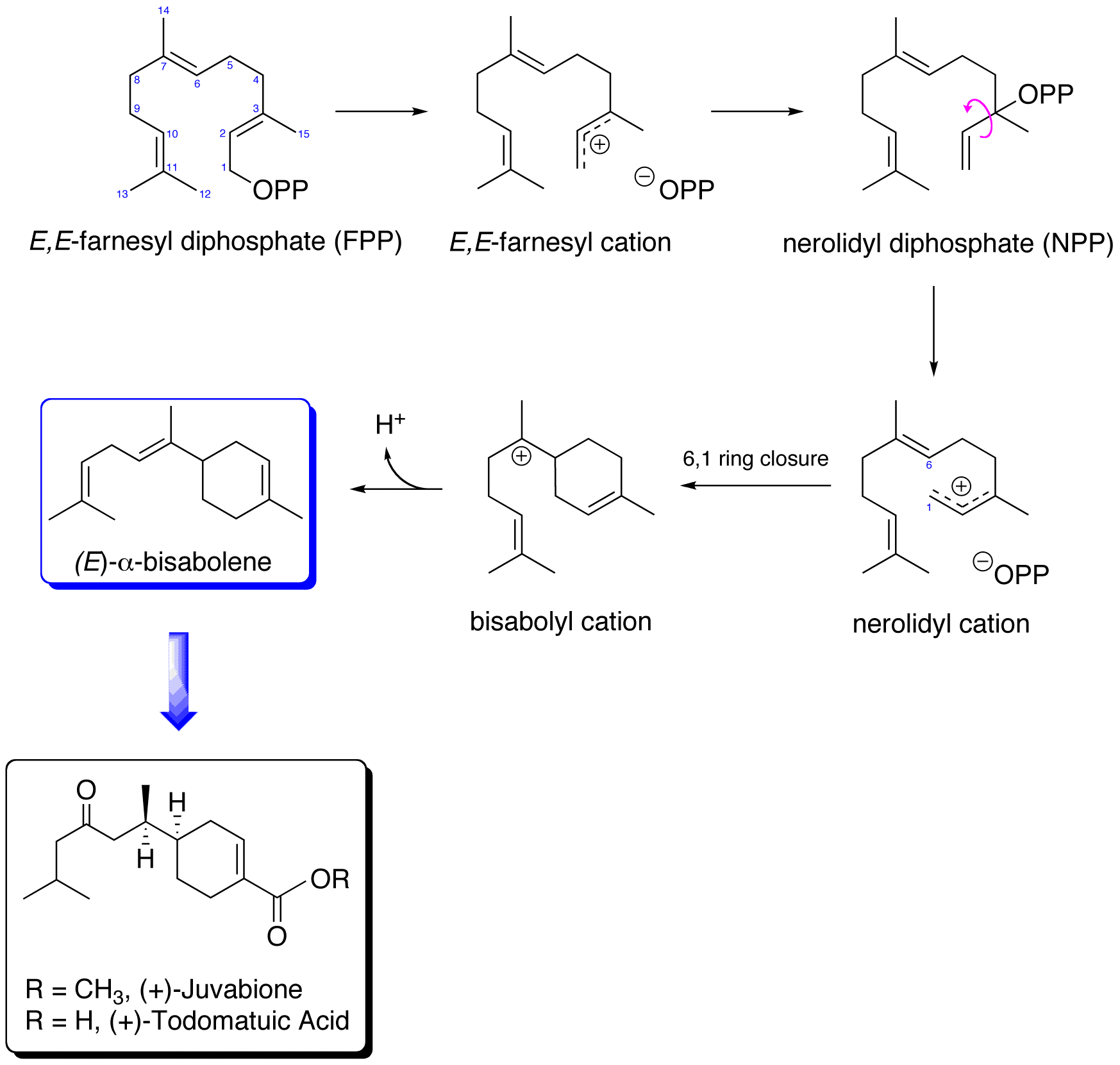

Scheme 1. Biosynthetic pathway for the synthesis of juvabione and todomatuic acid from FPP precursor.
