= Pupa =

Insect life stage

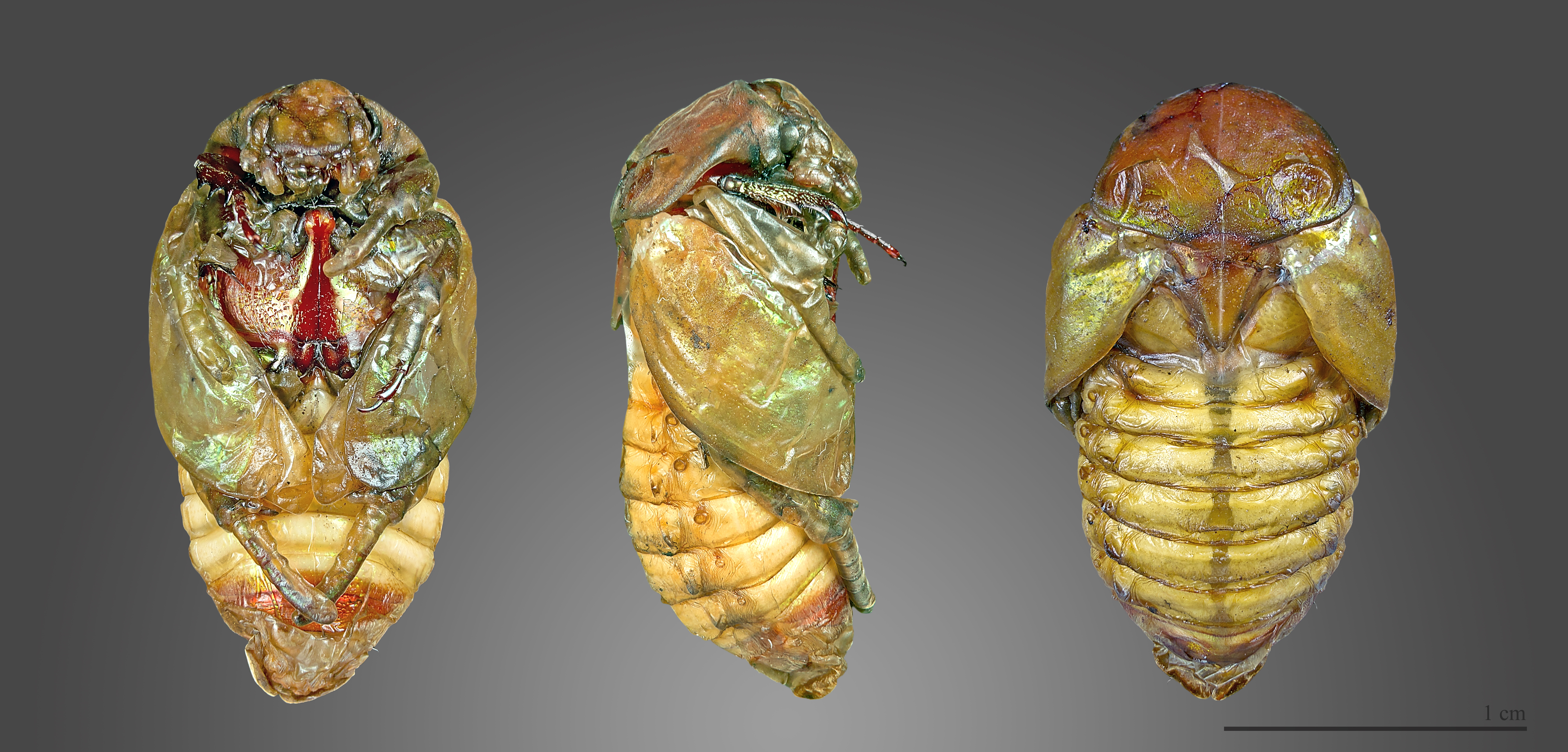
Pupa of the rose chafer beetle, Cetonia aurata

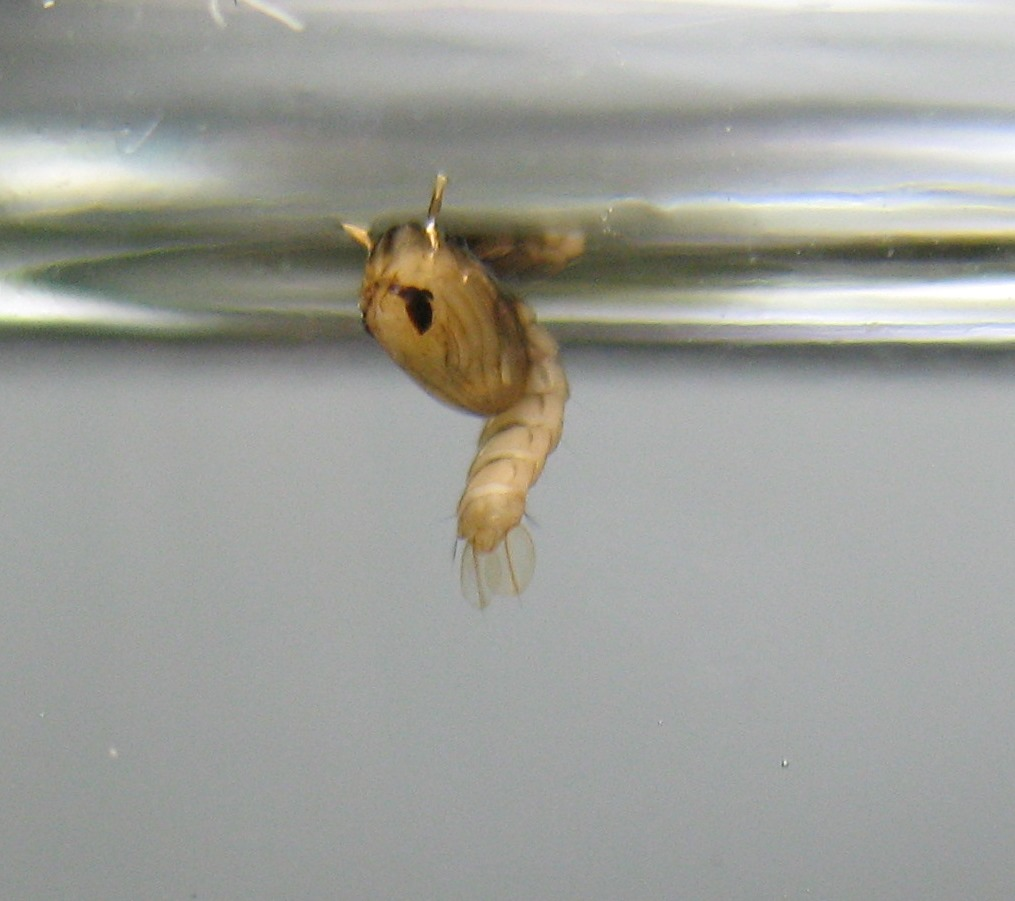
Tumbler (pupa) of a mosquito. Unlike most pupae, tumblers can swim around actively.

A pupa (from Latin pupa 'doll'; pl.: pupae) is the life stage of insects from the Holometabola clade undergoing metamorphosis between immature and mature stages. Insects that go through a pupal stage are holometabolous: they go through four distinct stages in their life cycle, the stages thereof being egg, larva, pupa and imago (adult). The processes of entering and completing the pupal stage are controlled by the insect's hormones, especially juvenile hormone, prothoracicotropic hormone, and ecdysone. The act of becoming a pupa is called pupation, and the act of emerging from the pupal case is called eclosion or emergence.

The pupae of different groups of insects have different names such as chrysalis for the pupae of butterflies and tumbler for those of the mosquito family. Unlike the fully motile larval and imago stages, the pupal stage of an insect is typically sessile, where the pupa remains anchored to a location until the metamorphosis is completed, and may be enclosed in protective structures such as cocoons, nests or shells.

== Position in life cycle ==
The pupal stage follows the larval stage, or in some cases a prepupal stage, and precedes adulthood (imago) in insects with complete metamorphosis. The pupa is a non-feeding, usually sessile stage, or highly active as in mosquitoes. It is during the pupal stage that the adult structures of the insect are formed while the larval structures are broken down. The adult structures grow from imaginal discs. Contrary to popular belief, larvae do not completely liquify inside the cocoon.

=== Duration ===
The pupal stage may last weeks, months, or even years, depending on temperature and the species of insect. For example, the pupal stage lasts eight to fifteen days in monarch butterflies. The pupa may enter dormancy or diapause until the appropriate season to emerge as an adult insect. In temperate climates pupae usually stay dormant during winter, while in the tropics pupae usually do so during the dry season.

== Emergence ==
Insects emerge (eclose) from pupae by splitting the pupal case. Most butterflies emerge in the morning. In mosquitoes, the emergence is in the evening or night. In fleas, the process is triggered by vibrations that indicate the possible presence of a suitable host. Prior to emergence, the adult inside the pupal exoskeleton is termed pharate. Once the pharate adult has eclosed from the pupa, the empty pupal exoskeleton is called an exuvia; in most hymenopterans (ants, bees and wasps) the exuvia is so thin and membranous that it becomes "crumpled" as it is shed. Measuring the timing of this emergence is of interest to chronobiologists because the process is regulated by circadian clocks in many species, necessitating different assays to measure eclosion timing.

Emergence

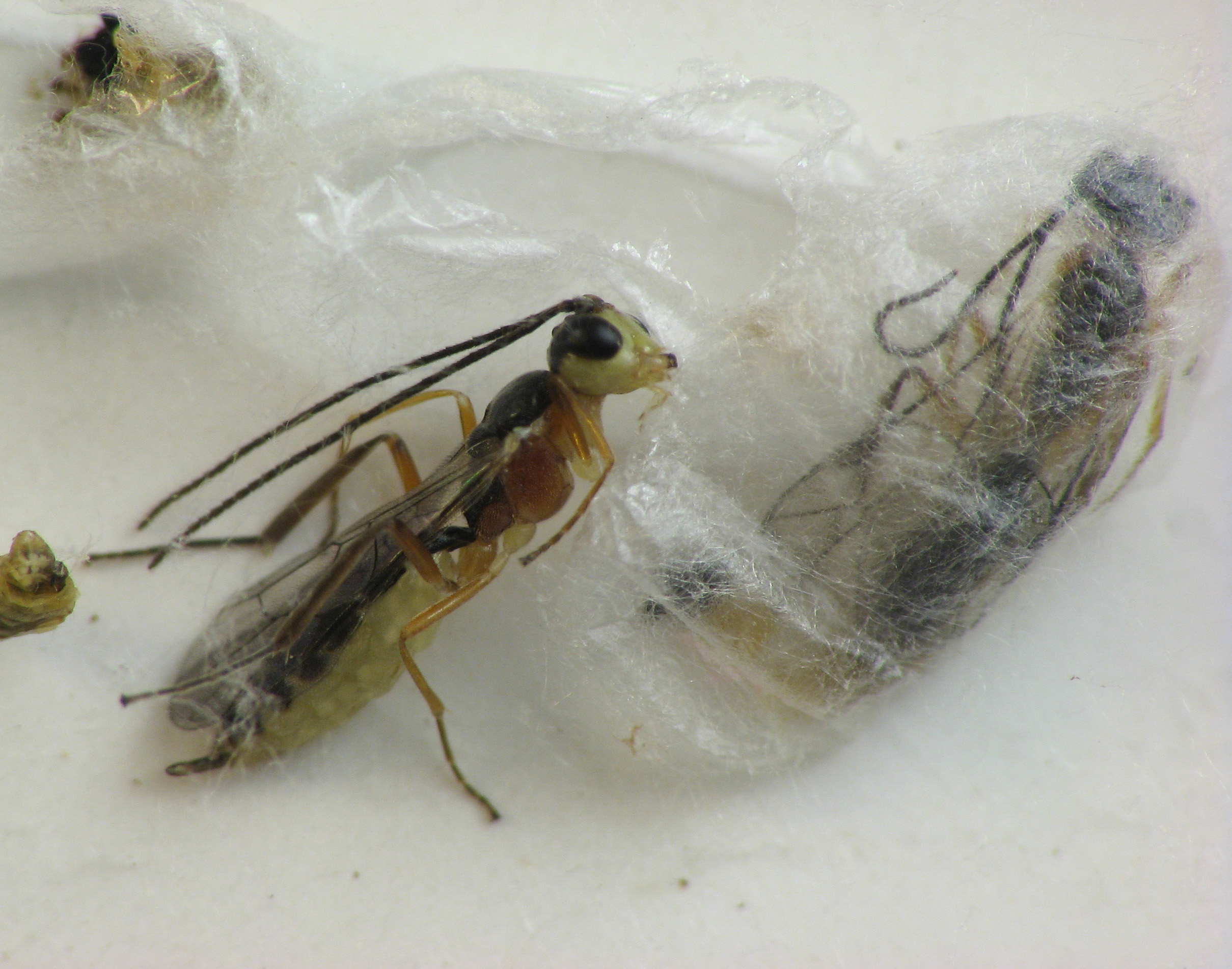
Adult Hercus fontinalis, a species of parasitoid wasp, emerging from cocoon

Eclosion of an African swallowtail butterfly (Papilio dardanus)

Luna moth emerging from pupa within silk cocoon

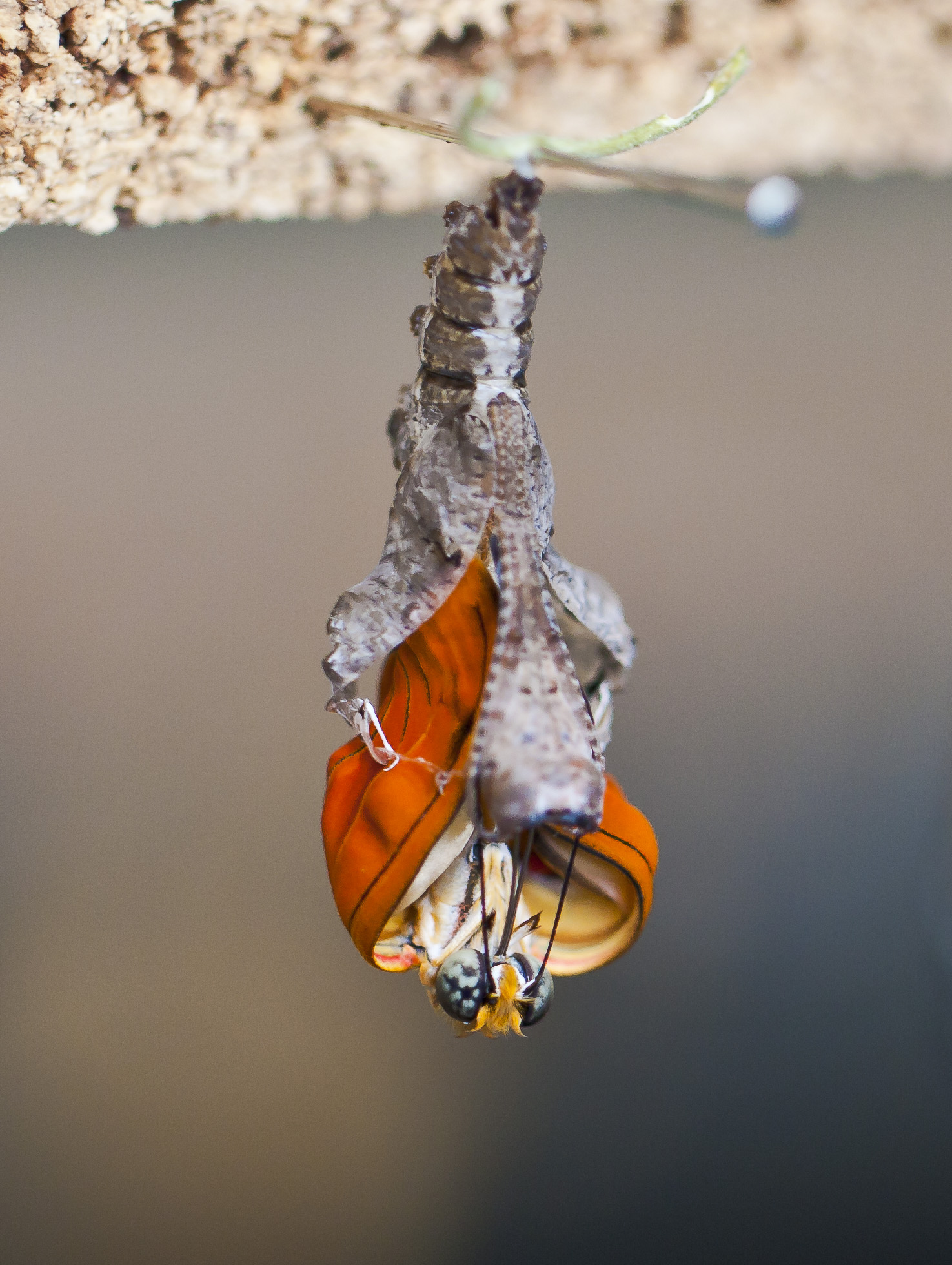
An eclosing Julia butterfly

=== Pupal mating ===
In a few taxa of the Lepidoptera, especially Heliconius, pupal mating is an extreme form of reproductive strategy in which the adult male mates with a female pupa about to emerge, or with the newly moulted female; this is accompanied by other actions such as capping of the reproductive system of the female with the sphragis, denying access to other males, or by exuding an anti-aphrodisiac pheromone.

== Defense ==
Pupae are usually immobile and are largely defenseless. To overcome this, pupating species often avoid predators by covering the pupa with a cocoon, camouflaging it, or placing it underground. Some species of lycaenid butterflies are protected in their pupal stage by ants. Pupae of other species make sounds or vibrations to scare potential predators. A few species use chemical defenses including toxic secretions. The pupae of social hymenopterans are protected by adult members of the hive.

== Types ==
Based on the presence or absence of articulated mandibles that are employed in emerging from a cocoon or pupal case, pupae can be classified into two types:

- Decticous – a pupa with articulated mandibles. Examples are pupae of the orders Neuroptera, Mecoptera, Trichoptera and few Lepidoptera families.
- Adecticous – a pupa without articulated mandibles. Examples include the orders Strepsiptera, Coleoptera, Hymenoptera, Diptera and Siphonaptera.

Based on whether the pupal appendages are free or attached to the body, pupae can be classified into three types:

- Exarate – appendages are free and are not usually encapsulated within a cocoon. Decticous pupae are always exarate; some adecticous pupae are as well. (Neuroptera, Trichoptera, Cyclorrhapha of Dipterans, Siphonaptera, most Coleoptera, Hymenoptera, and a few Lepidoptera)
- Obtect – appendages are attached closely to the body and are commonly encapsulated within a cocoon. Some adecticous pupae are obtect forms. (Most Lepidoptera, Nematocera and Brachycera of Dipterans, Staphylinidae and Chrysomelidae Coleopterans, many Chalcidoidea Hymenopterans)
- Coarctate – enclosed in a hardened cuticle of the penultimate larval instar called a puparium. However, the pupa itself is of the exarate adecticous pupal form. (Cyclorrhapha of Dipterans)

=== Chrysalis of butterflies ===
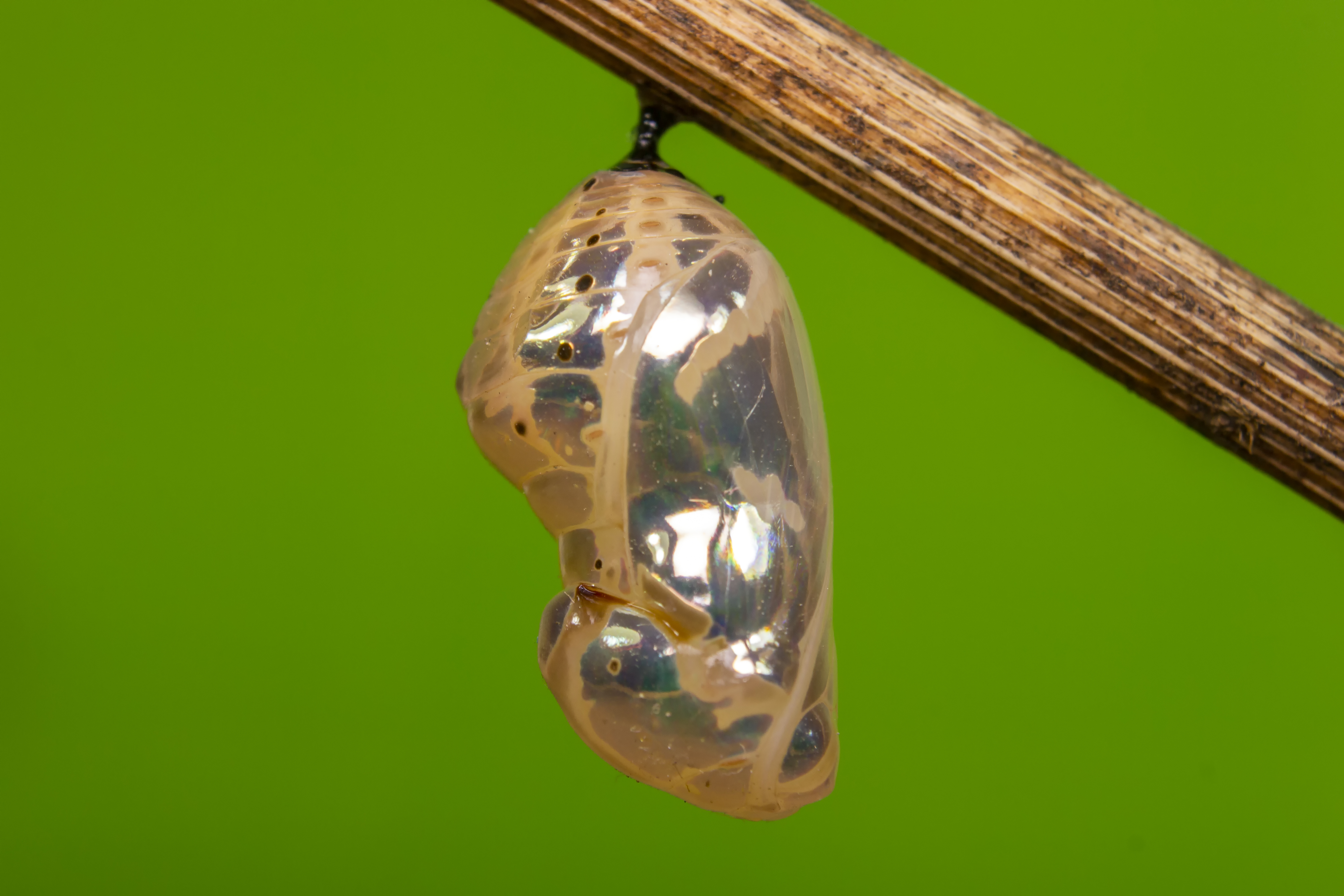
Common crow butterfly (Euploea core) chrysalis illustrating the Ancient Greek origin of the term: χρυσός (chrysós) for gold

A chrysalis (Latin: chrysallis, from Ancient Greek: χρυσαλλίς, chrysallís, plural: chrysalides, also known as an aurelia) or nympha is the pupal stage of butterflies. The term is derived from the metallic–gold coloration of the pupae of many butterflies, referred to by the Ancient Greek term χρυσός (chrysós) for gold. When the caterpillar is fully grown, it makes a button of silk which it uses to fasten its body to a leaf or a twig. Then the caterpillar's skin comes off for the final time. Under this old skin is a hard skin called a chrysalis.

Because chrysalides are often showy and are formed in the open, they are the most familiar examples of pupae. Most chrysalides are attached to a surface by a touch fastener-like arrangement of a silken pad spun by the caterpillar, usually cemented to the underside of a perch, and the cremastral hook or hooks protruding from the rear of the chrysalis or cremaster (Gr. kremastos 'suspended') at the tip of the pupal abdomen by which the caterpillar fixes itself to the pad of silk.

Like other types of pupae, the chrysalis stage in most butterflies involves little movement. However, some butterfly pupae are capable of moving the abdominal segments to produce sounds or to scare away potential predators. Within the chrysalis, growth and differentiation occur. The adult butterfly emerges (ecloses) from this and expands its wings by pumping haemolymph into the wing veins.

When emerging, the butterfly uses a liquid containing the enzyme cocoonase, which softens the shell of the chrysalis, and two sharp claws on the thick joints at the base of the forewings to help make its way out. Having emerged, the butterfly usually sits on the empty shell to expand and harden its wings. However, if the chrysalis has fallen off its silk pad, the butterfly finds another vertical surface to rest upon and harden its wings.

Moth pupae are usually dark in color and either formed in underground cells, loose in the soil, or their pupa is contained in a cocoon. The pupa of some species such as the hornet moth develops sharp ridges around the outside called adminicula that allow the pupa to move from its place of concealment inside a tree trunk when it is time for the adult to emerge.

=== Cocoon ===
A cocoon is a casing spun of silk by many moths and caterpillars, and numerous other holometabolous insect larvae as a protective covering for the pupa.

Cocoons may be tough or soft, opaque or translucent, solid or meshlike, of various colors, or composed of multiple layers, depending on the type of insect larva producing it. Many moth caterpillars shed the larval hairs (setae) and incorporate them into the cocoon; if these are urticating hairs then the cocoon is also irritating to the touch. Some larvae attach small twigs, fecal pellets or pieces of vegetation to the outside of their cocoon in an attempt to disguise it from predators. Others spin their cocoon in a concealed location—on the underside of a leaf, in a crevice, down near the base of a tree trunk, suspended from a twig or concealed in the leaf litter.

The silk in the cocoon of the silk moth can be unraveled to harvest silk fibre which makes this moth the most economically important of all lepidopterans. The silk moth is the only completely domesticated lepidopteran; it does not exist in the wild.

Insects that pupate in a cocoon must escape from it, and they do this either by the adult cutting its way out, or by secreting enzymes, sometimes called cocoonase, that soften the cocoon. Some cocoons are constructed with built-in lines of weakness along which they will tear easily from inside, or with exit holes that only allow a one-way passage out; such features facilitate the escape of the adult insect after it emerges from the pupal skin.

Cocoon

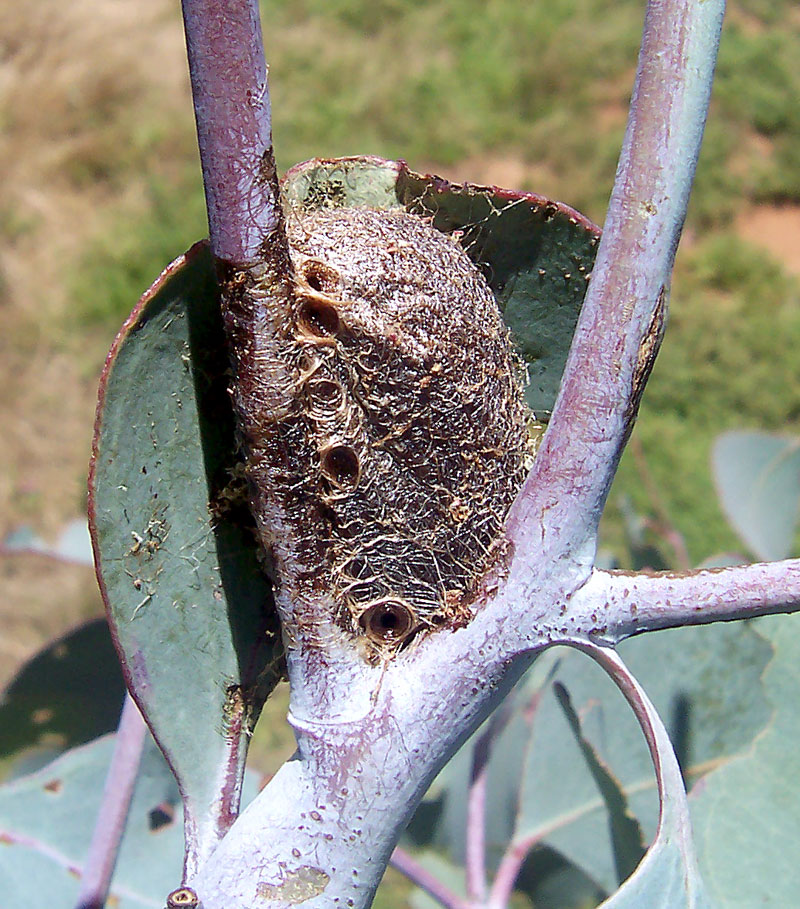
The tough brown cocoon of an emperor gum moth

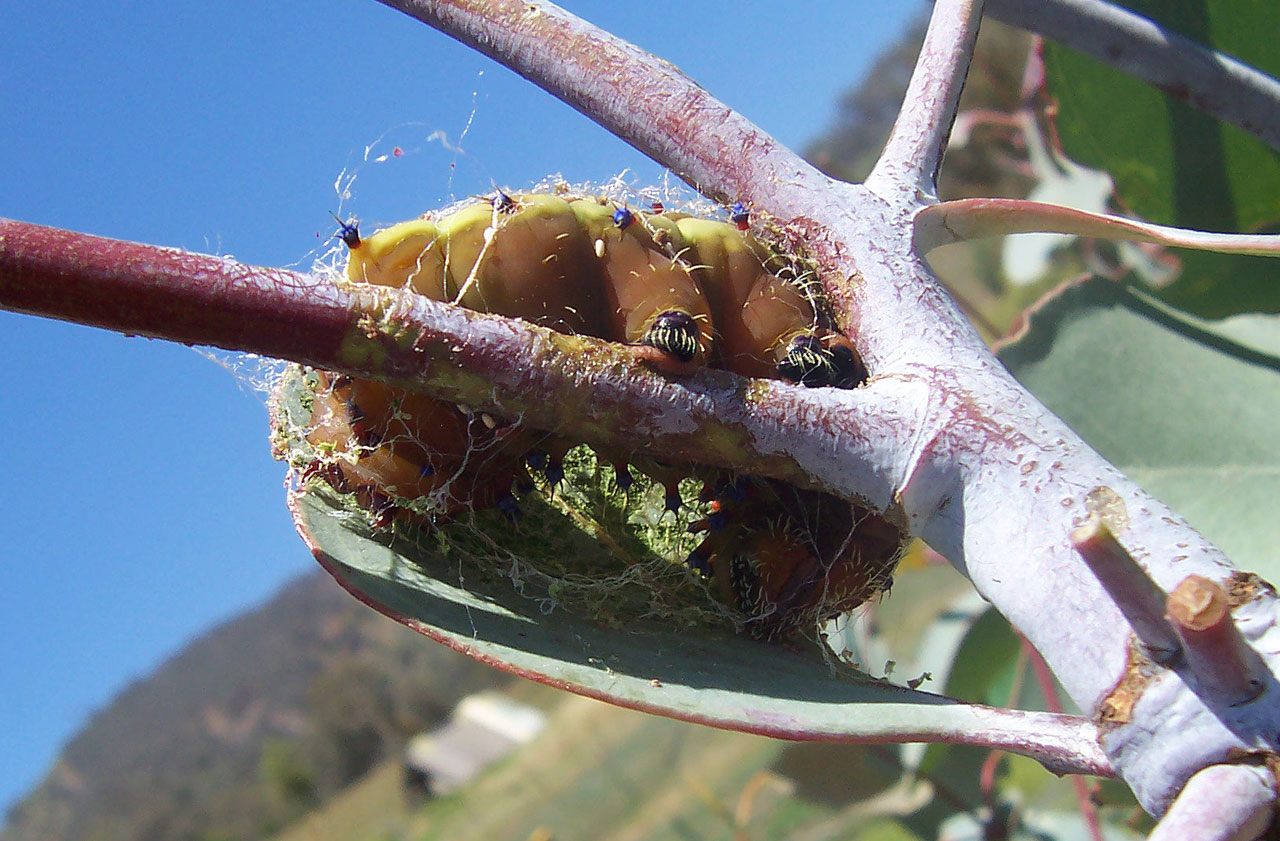
An emperor gum moth caterpillar spinning its cocoon

=== Puparium ===
Some pupae remain inside the exoskeleton of the final larval instar, in which case this last larval "shell" is called a puparium (plural, puparia). Flies of the group Muscomorpha have puparia, as do members of the order Strepsiptera, and the Hemipteran family Aleyrodidae.

Puparium

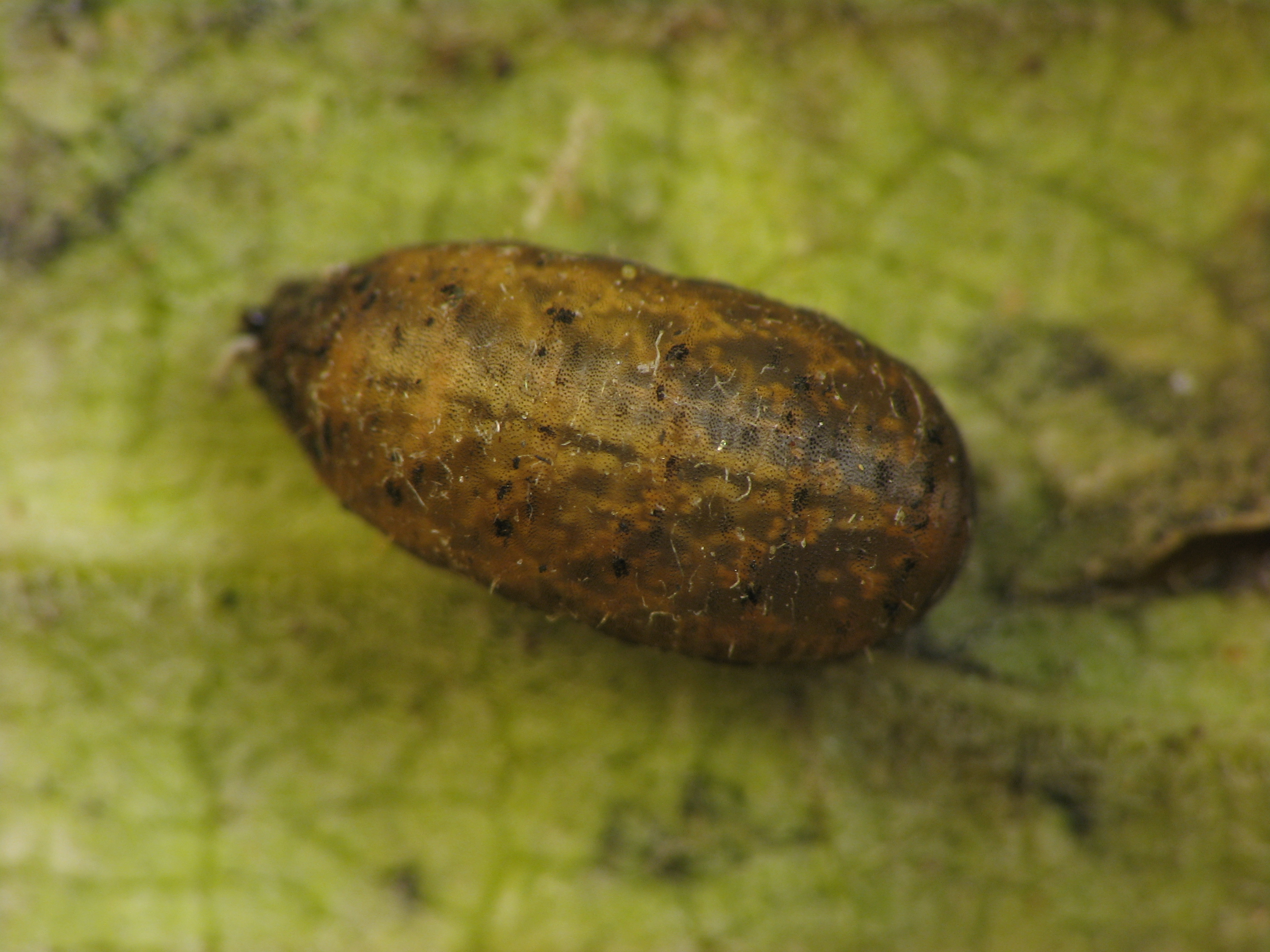
Puparium of the American hoverfly, Eupeodes americanus

Parasitoid wasp Xenomorphia resurrecta inside a fossilized fly puparium, as revealed by X-ray microtomography

== See also ==
- Bee brood
- Larva
- Silk
