= Alpha-bisabolene synthase =

Enzyme

α-isabolene synthase

Identifiers
- EC no.: 4.2.3.38

Databases
- IntEnz: IntEnz view
- BRENDA: BRENDA entry
- ExPASy: NiceZyme view
- KEGG: KEGG entry
- MetaCyc: metabolic pathway
- PRIAM: profile
- PDB structures: RCSB PDB PDBe PDBsum
Search
- PMC: articles
- PubMed: articles
- NCBI: proteins

α-Bisabolene synthase (EC 4.2.3.38, bisabolene synthase) is an enzyme with systematic name (2E,6E)-farnesyl-diphosphate diphosphate-lyase ((E)-α-bisabolene-forming).

This enzyme catalyses the following chemical reaction:

(2E,6E)-farnesyl diphosphate $\rightleftharpoons$ (E)-α-bisabolene + diphosphate

This synthase requires a divalent cation cofactor (Mg^{2+} or, to a lesser extent, Mn^{2+}) to neutralize the negative charge of the diphosphate leaving group.
