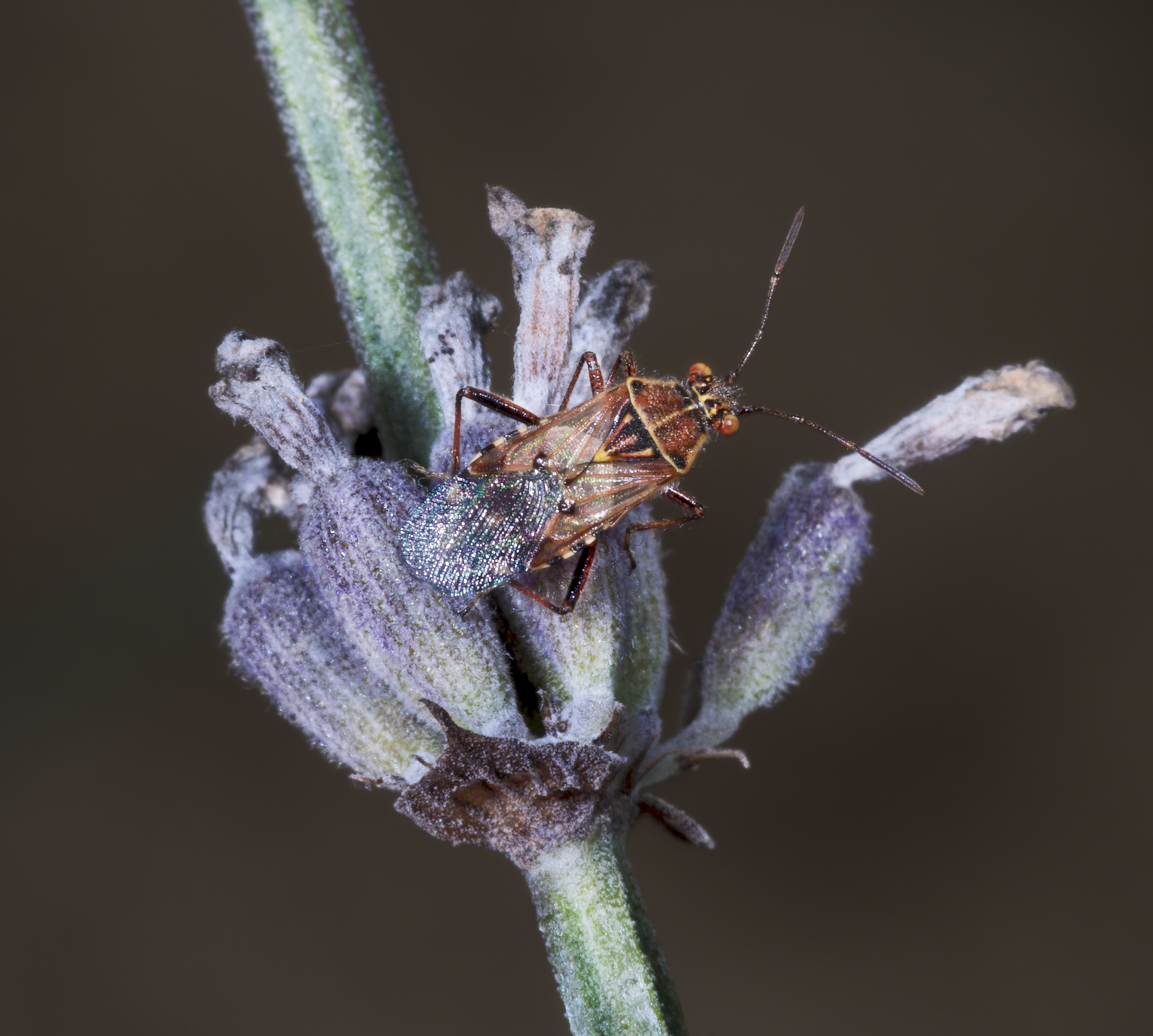

Scientific classification
- Kingdom: Animalia
- Phylum: Arthropoda
- Clade: Pancrustacea
- Class: Insecta
- Order: Hemiptera
- Suborder: Heteroptera
- Family: Rhopalidae
- Genus: Liorhyssus
- Species: L. hyalinus

Binomial name
- Liorhyssus hyalinus (Fabricius, 1794)

= Liorhyssus hyalinus =

Species of true bug

Liorhyssus hyalinus is a species of scentless plant bugs belonging to the family Rhopalidae, subfamily Rhopalinae.

== Synonyms ==
- Corizus gracilis Herrich-Schäffer, 1835 Liorhyssus gracilis (Herrich-Schäffer, 1835)
- Corizus capensis Germar, 1838. Liorhyssus capensis (Germar, 1838)
- Rhopalus bengalensis Dallas, 1852 Liorhyssus bengalensis (Dallas, 1852)
- Merocoris maculiventris Spinola, 1852 Liorhyssus maculiventris (Spinola, 1852)
- Merocoris microtomus Spinola, 1852Liorhyssus microtomus (Spinola, 1852)
- Corizus dilatipennis Signoret, 1859 Liorhyssus dilatipennis (Signoret, 1859)
- Corizus lugens Signoret, 1859Liorhyssus lugens (Signoret, 1859)
- Corizus marginatus Jakovlev, 1871; Liorhyssus marginatus (Jakovlev, 1871)
- Corizus (Liorhyssus) hyalinus var. nigrinus Puton, 1881 Liorhyssus nigrinus (Puton, 1881)
- Liorhyssus natalensis var. corallinus Horváth, 1911 Liorhyssus corallinus (Horváth, 1911)
- Corizus imperialis Distant, 1918Liorhyssus imperialis (Distant, 1918)

== Distribution ==
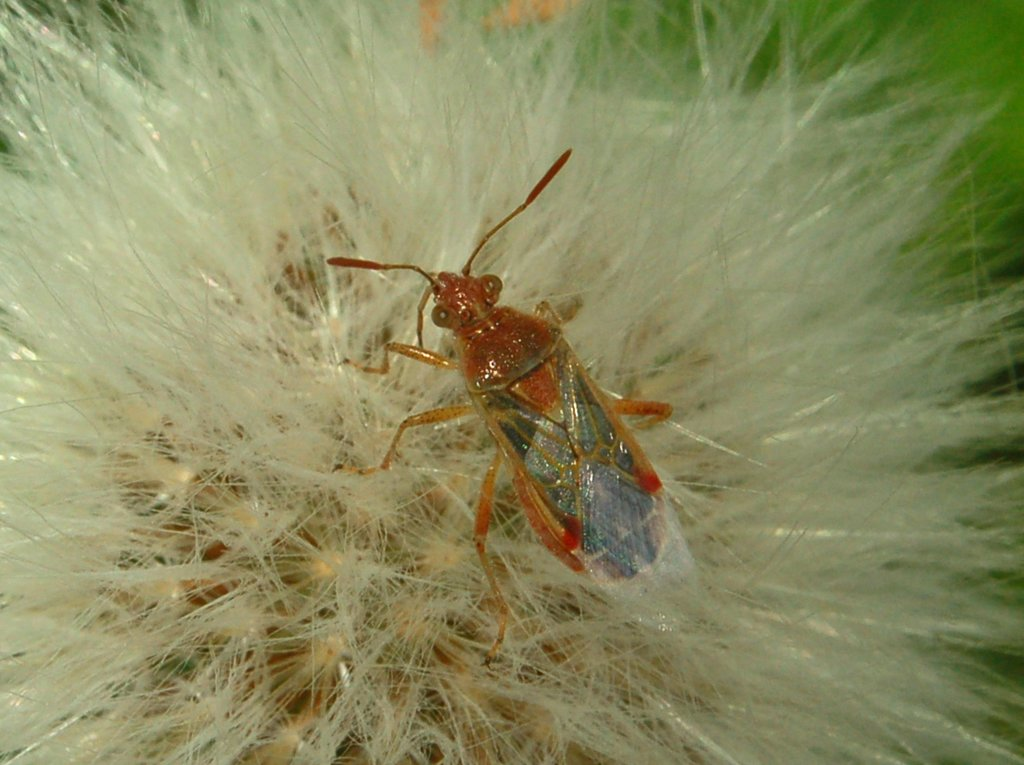
Liorhyssus hyalinus

This species can be found in most of Europe, in Africa, Australia, Northern Asia, Middle America, North America, Oceania, South America and Southern Asia.

== Description ==
Liorhyssus hyalinus can reach a length of 6.5–7.5 millimetres (0.26–0.30 in). The basic body color varies from yellow-brown to red, but the upperside of the abdomen is mainly dark. This species can be distinguished by the length of the hyaline membrane of the hemelytra, which extends beyond the black upperside of the abdomen. There are two black spots at the extremity of the pronotum. These bugs are rather similar to Rhopalus and Stictopleurus species.

== Biology ==
Adults are present all year around. Like the rest of the Rhopalidae family, this species is a plant feeder. It mainly feeds on Compositae and Erodium species.

== Bibliography ==
- Dolling W.R., 2004 - Superfamily Coreoidea - Catalogue of the Heteroptera of the Palaearctic Region
- Henry, Thomas J., and Richard C. Froeschner, eds. (1988), Catalog of the Heteroptera, or True Bugs, of Canada and the Continental United States
