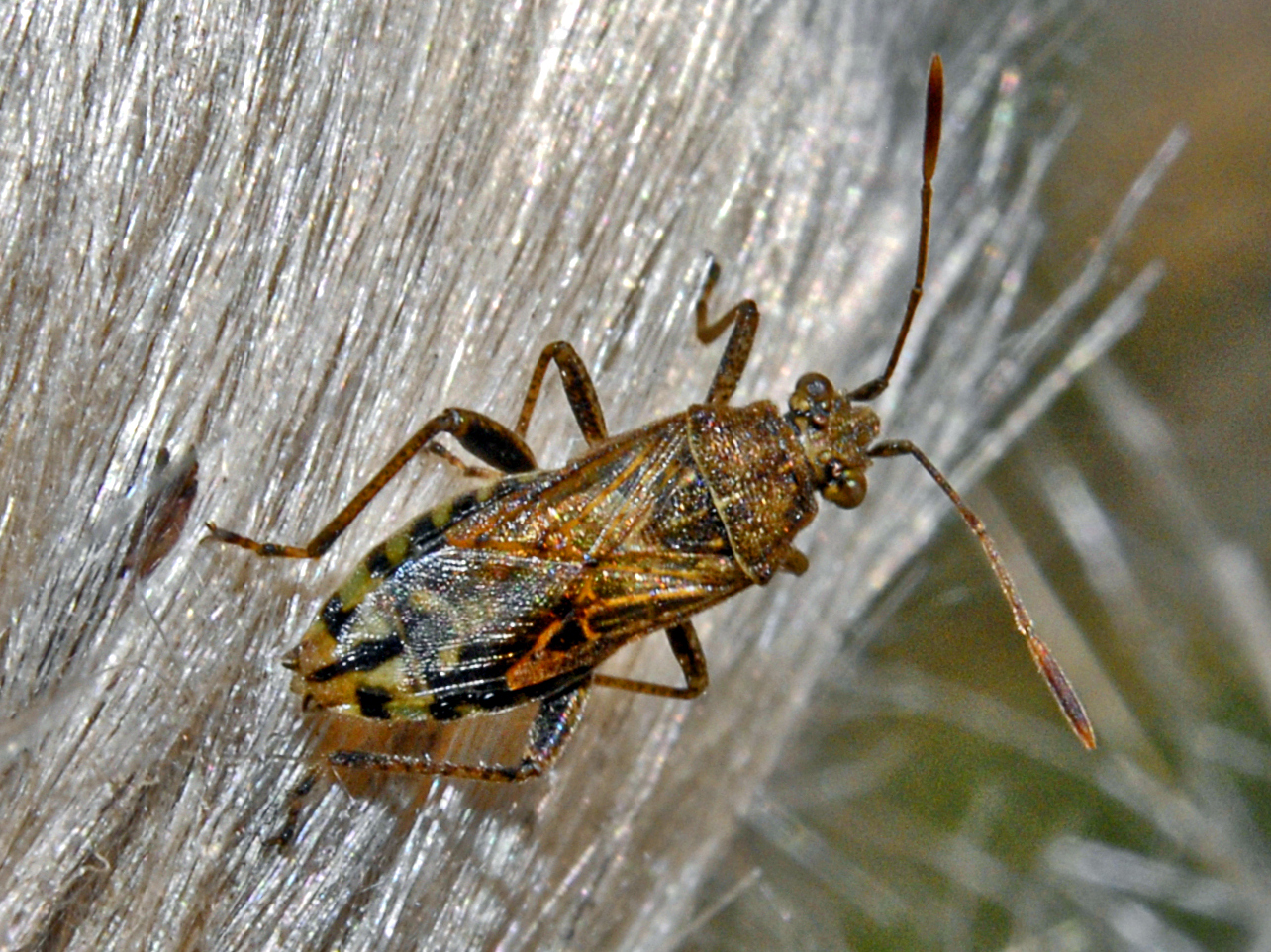
- Stictopleurus punctatonervosus, male

Scientific classification
- Domain: Eukaryota
- Kingdom: Animalia
- Phylum: Arthropoda
- Class: Insecta
- Order: Hemiptera
- Suborder: Heteroptera
- Family: Rhopalidae
- Genus: Stictopleurus
- Species: S. punctatonervosus

Binomial name
- Stictopleurus punctatonervosus (Goeze, 1778)

= Stictopleurus punctatonervosus =

Species of true bug

Stictopleurus punctatonervosus is a species of scentless plant bugs belonging to the family Rhopalidae, subfamily Rhopalinae.

== Description ==
Stictopleurus punctatonervosus can reach a length of 6.5–9 millimetres (0.26–0.35 in). These bugs have a regularly punctuated pronotum, a banded connexivum and a rounded tip of the scutellum. The body is grey-brown to black, while the abdomen is often greenish. It can be distinguished from the closely related S. abutilon by the presence of two half-circle marks on the anterior margin of pronotum (as opposed to full circles in S. abutilon).

== Biology ==
Adults can be found all year. In southern Europe two generations per year are likely formed. Females lay their eggs in the spring. New generation is complete by August. The species overwinters as imago and can be observed after hibernation from the end of April until the middle or the end of October. These bugs feed on various Asteraceae species.

== Distribution ==
This species is widespread in most of Europe and east to Siberia and Central Asia. It prefers dry and warm grassland habitats and it is often found on meadows, wasteland or roadsides.

== Bibliography ==
- Zoologische Staatssammlung München: Bestimmungsschlüssel der Familie Rhopalidae AMYOT & SERVILLE, 1843, Unterfamilie Rhopalinae AMYOT & SERVILLE, 1843 (Glasflügelwanzen) aus Bayern.
- Ekkehard Wachmann, Albert Melber, Jürgen Deckert: Wanzen Band 3: Aradidae, Lygaeidae, Piesmatidae, Berytidae, Pyrrhocoridae, Alydidae, Coreidae, Rhopalidae, Stenocephalidae, Goecke & Evers, Keltern 2007, ISBN 978-3-937783-29-1: S. 246–248
