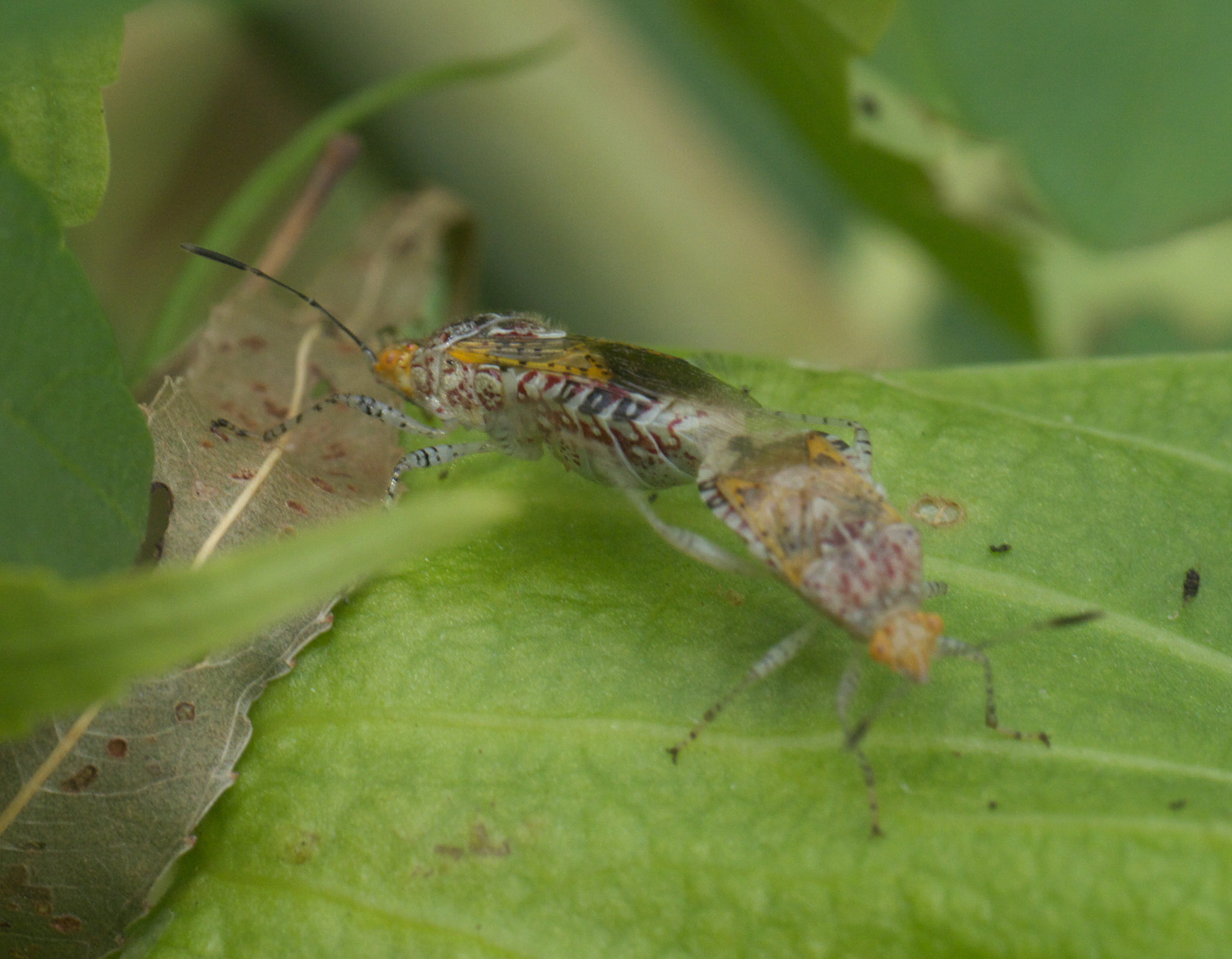

Scientific classification
- Domain: Eukaryota
- Kingdom: Animalia
- Phylum: Arthropoda
- Class: Insecta
- Order: Hemiptera
- Suborder: Heteroptera
- Family: Rhopalidae
- Tribe: Niesthreini
- Genus: Niesthrea
- Species: N. louisianica

Binomial name
- Niesthrea louisianica Sailer, 1961

= Niesthrea louisianica =

Species of true bug

Niesthrea louisianica is a species of scentless plant bug in the family Rhopalidae. It is found in North America and Oceania.
