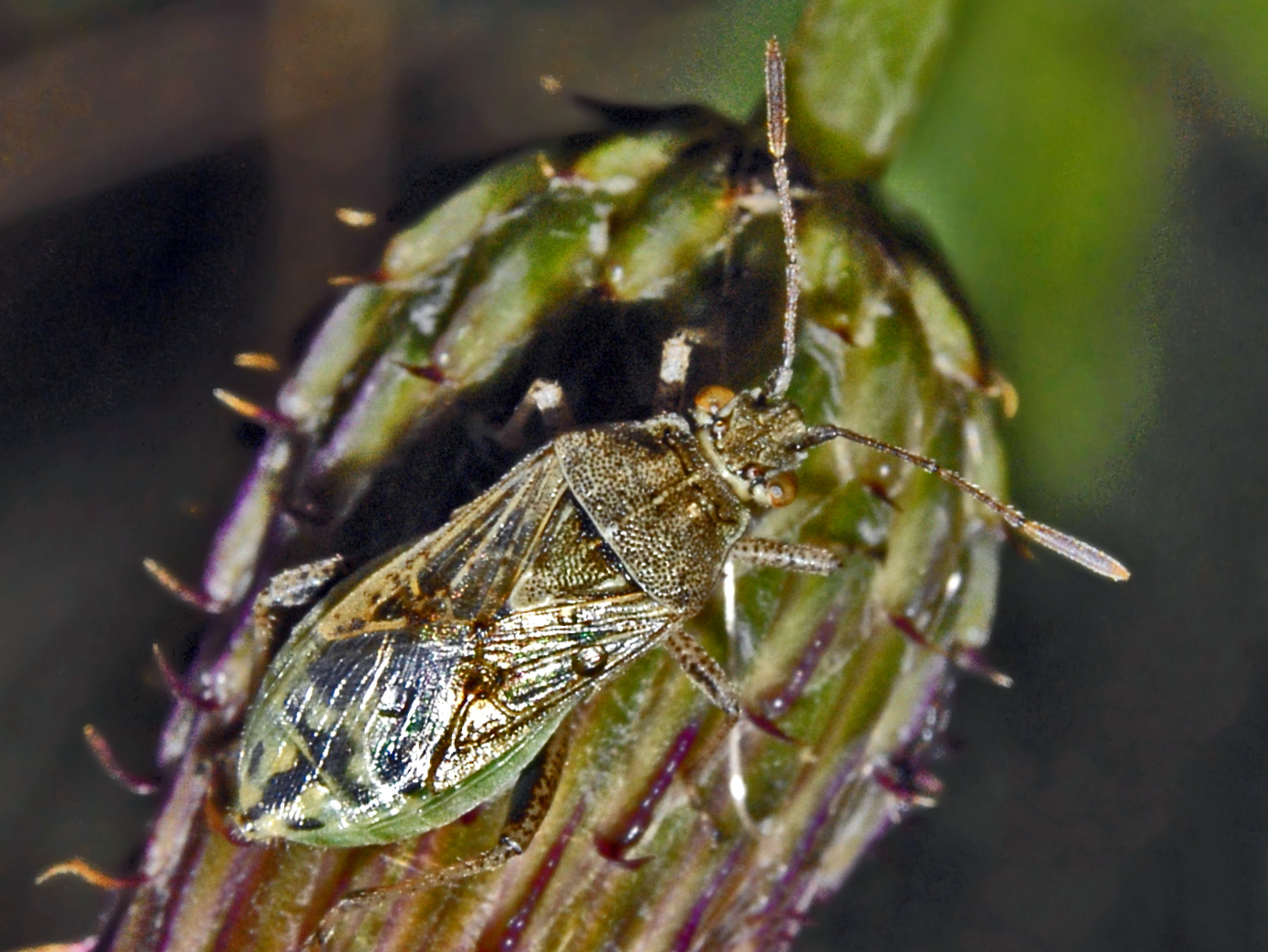

Scientific classification
- Kingdom: Animalia
- Phylum: Arthropoda
- Class: Insecta
- Order: Hemiptera
- Suborder: Heteroptera
- Family: Rhopalidae
- Genus: Stictopleurus
- Species: S. crassicornis

Binomial name
- Stictopleurus crassicornis (Linnaeus, 1758)

Synonyms
- Cimex crassicornis Linnaeus, 1758

= Stictopleurus crassicornis =

Species of true bug

Stictopleurus crassicornis, commonly known as the thick-horned scentless plant bug, is a species of scentless plant bugs belonging to the family Rhopalidae, subfamily Rhopalinae.

== Description ==
Stictopleurus crassicornis can reach a length of 6.7–8.2 millimetres (0.26–0.32 in). These bugs have a punctuated pronotum, a banded connexivum and a rounded or pointed tip of the scutellum. The body is brown and the abdomen is often greenish. In the anterior margin of the pronotum there are two small dark brown markings quite difficult to discern.

== Biology ==
Adults can be found from June to September. These bugs feed on various Asteraceae species.

== Distribution ==
This species is widespread in most of Europe and in Northern Asia (excluding China). The preferred habitats are meadows.

== Bibliography ==
- Henry, Thomas J., and Richard C. Froeschner, eds. (1988), Catalog of the Heteroptera, or True Bugs, of Canada and the Continental United States
- Göllner-Scheiding, Ursula (1975) Revision der Gattung Stictopleurus Stål, 1872 (Heteroptera, Rhopalidae), Deutsche Entomologische Zeitschrift, n. f., vol. 22, no. 1-3
