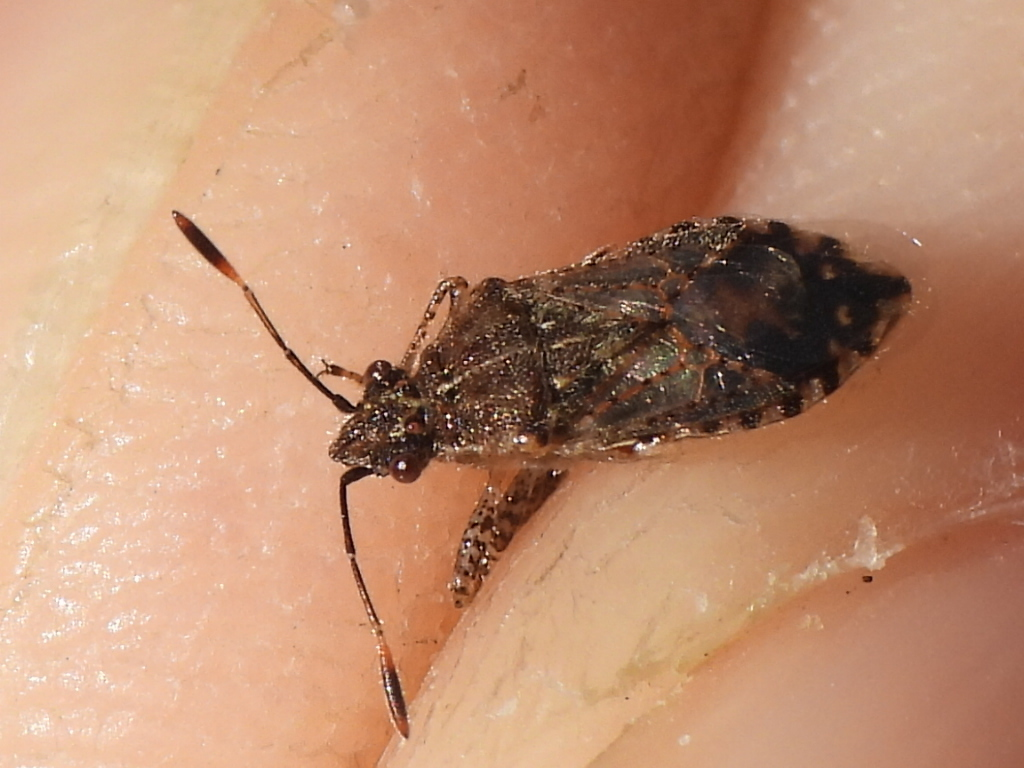
- Arhyssus nigristernum, Pennsylvania

Scientific classification
- Domain: Eukaryota
- Kingdom: Animalia
- Phylum: Arthropoda
- Class: Insecta
- Order: Hemiptera
- Suborder: Heteroptera
- Family: Rhopalidae
- Tribe: Niesthreini
- Genus: Arhyssus
- Species: A. nigristernum

Binomial name
- Arhyssus nigristernum (Signoret, 1859)

Synonyms
- Arhyssus bohemani (Signoret, 1859); Corizus bohemani Signoret, 1859

= Arhyssus nigristernum =

Species of true bug

Arhyssus nigristernum is a species of scentless plant bug in the family Rhopalidae. It is found in North America.
