= Stictopleurus viridicatus =

Scientific classification
- Domain: Eukaryota
- Kingdom: Animalia
- Phylum: Arthropoda
- Class: Insecta
- Order: Hemiptera
- Suborder: Heteroptera
- Family: Rhopalidae
- Tribe: Rhopalini
- Genus: Stictopleurus
- Species: S. viridicatus

Binomial name
- Stictopleurus viridicatus (Uhler, 1872)

Species of true bug

Stictopleurus viridicatus is a species of scentless plant bug in the family Rhopalidae. It is found in North America.
