= Harmostes dorsalis =

Scientific classification
- Kingdom: Animalia
- Phylum: Arthropoda
- Class: Insecta
- Order: Hemiptera
- Suborder: Heteroptera
- Family: Rhopalidae
- Tribe: Harmostini
- Genus: Harmostes
- Species: H. dorsalis

Binomial name
- Harmostes dorsalis Burmeister, 1835

Species of true bug

Harmostes dorsalis is a species of scentless plant bug in the family Rhopalidae. It is found in Central America, North America, and South America.
