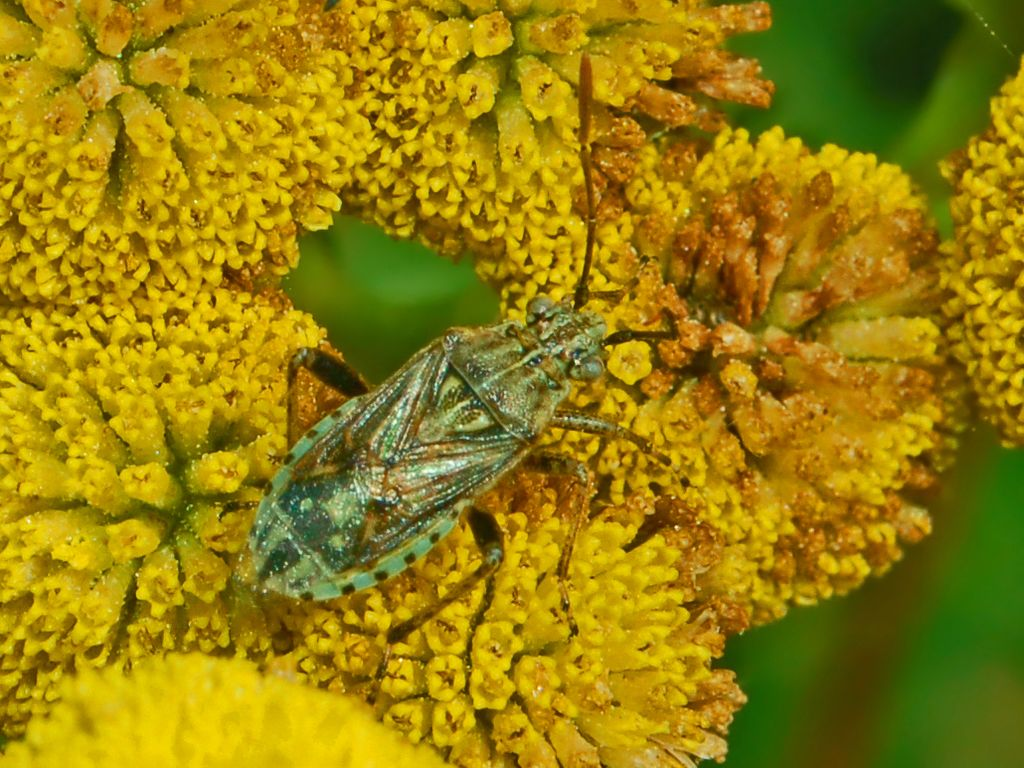

Scientific classification
- Domain: Eukaryota
- Kingdom: Animalia
- Phylum: Arthropoda
- Class: Insecta
- Order: Hemiptera
- Suborder: Heteroptera
- Family: Rhopalidae
- Genus: Stictopleurus
- Species: S. subtomentosus

Binomial name
- Stictopleurus subtomentosus (Rey, 1888)

= Stictopleurus subtomentosus =

Species of true bug

Stictopleurus subtomentosus is a species of scentless plant bugs belonging to the family Rhopalidae, subfamily Rhopalinae.

It is mainly found in France, Italy, Greece and Spain.
