= Harmostes angustatus =

Scientific classification
- Domain: Eukaryota
- Kingdom: Animalia
- Phylum: Arthropoda
- Class: Insecta
- Order: Hemiptera
- Suborder: Heteroptera
- Family: Rhopalidae
- Tribe: Harmostini
- Genus: Harmostes
- Species: H. angustatus

Binomial name
- Harmostes angustatus Van Duzee, 1918

Species of true bug

Harmostes angustatus is a species of scentless plant bug in the family Rhopalidae. It is found in Central America and North America.
