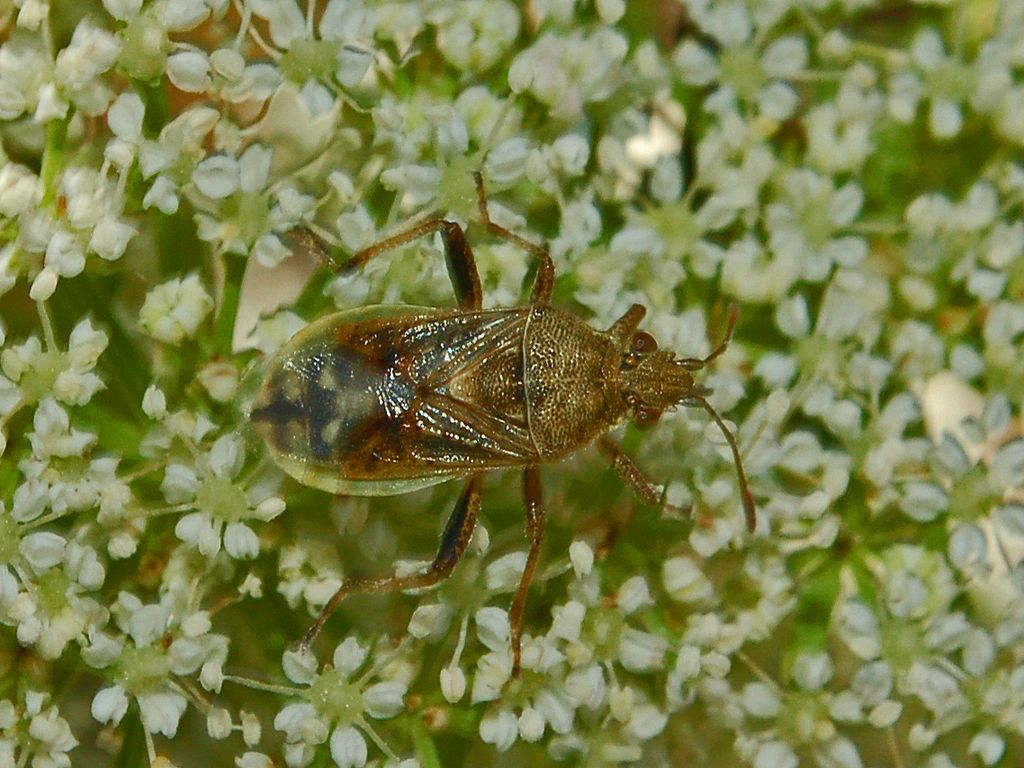

Scientific classification
- Domain: Eukaryota
- Kingdom: Animalia
- Phylum: Arthropoda
- Class: Insecta
- Order: Hemiptera
- Suborder: Heteroptera
- Family: Rhopalidae
- Genus: Rhopalus
- Species: R. lepidus

Binomial name
- Rhopalus lepidus Fieber, 1861

= Rhopalus lepidus =

Species of true bug

Rhopalus lepidus is a species of scentless plant bug belonging to the family Rhopalidae, subfamily Rhopalinae.

It is found in Bulgaria, France, Italy, Greece, Spain, Portugal and Jugoslavia.
