= Arhyssus scutatus =

Scientific classification
- Kingdom: Animalia
- Phylum: Arthropoda
- Clade: Pancrustacea
- Class: Insecta
- Order: Hemiptera
- Suborder: Heteroptera
- Family: Rhopalidae
- Genus: Arhyssus
- Species: A. scutatus

Binomial name
- Arhyssus scutatus (Stål, 1859)

Species of true bug

Arhyssus scutatus is a species of scentless plant bug in the family Rhopalidae. It is found in North America.
