= Myrmus =

Scientific classification
- Domain: Eukaryota
- Kingdom: Animalia
- Phylum: Arthropoda
- Class: Insecta
- Order: Hemiptera
- Suborder: Heteroptera
- Family: Rhopalidae
- Subfamily: Rhopalinae
- Tribe: Chorosomatini
- Genus: Myrmus; Hahn, 1832

Genus of insects

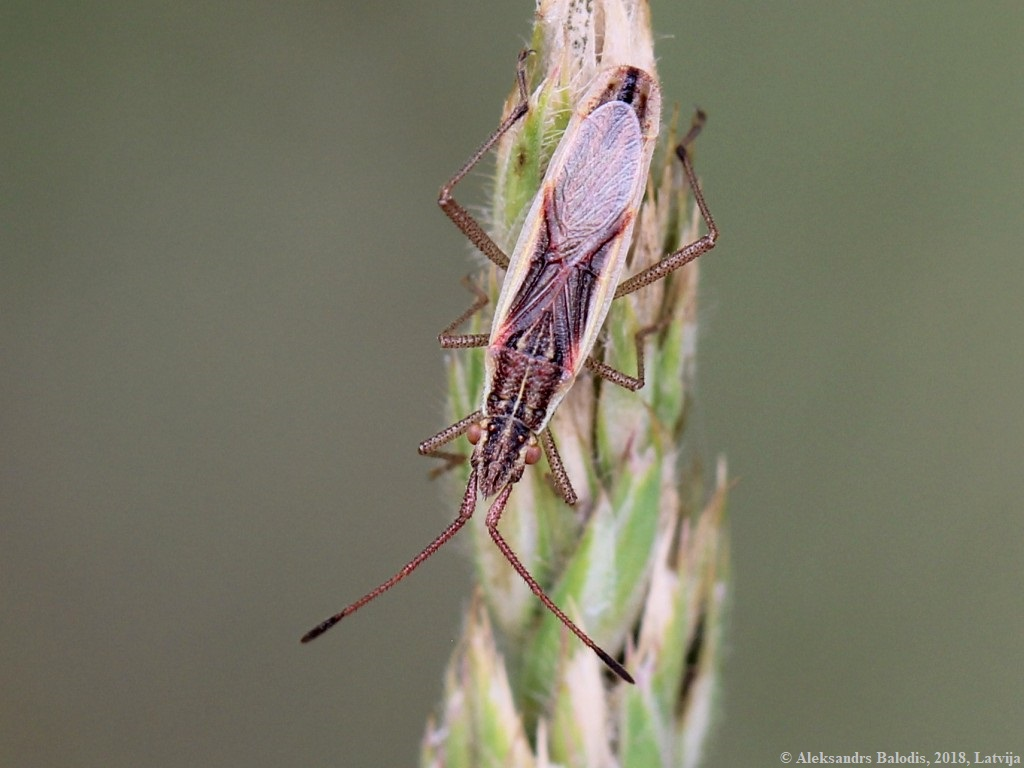
Myrmus miriformis

Myrmus is a genus of Palaearctic bugs in the subfamily Rhopalinae and tribe Chorosomatini, erected by Carl Wilhelm Hahn in 1832.

== Species ==
The Coreoidea Species File lists:

1. Myrmus calcaratus Reuter, 1891
2. Myrmus glabellus Horváth, 1901
3. Myrmus lateralis Hsiao, 1964
4. Myrmus miriformis (Fallén, 1807) - type species (as Coreus miriformis Fallén = M. miriformis miriformis)
