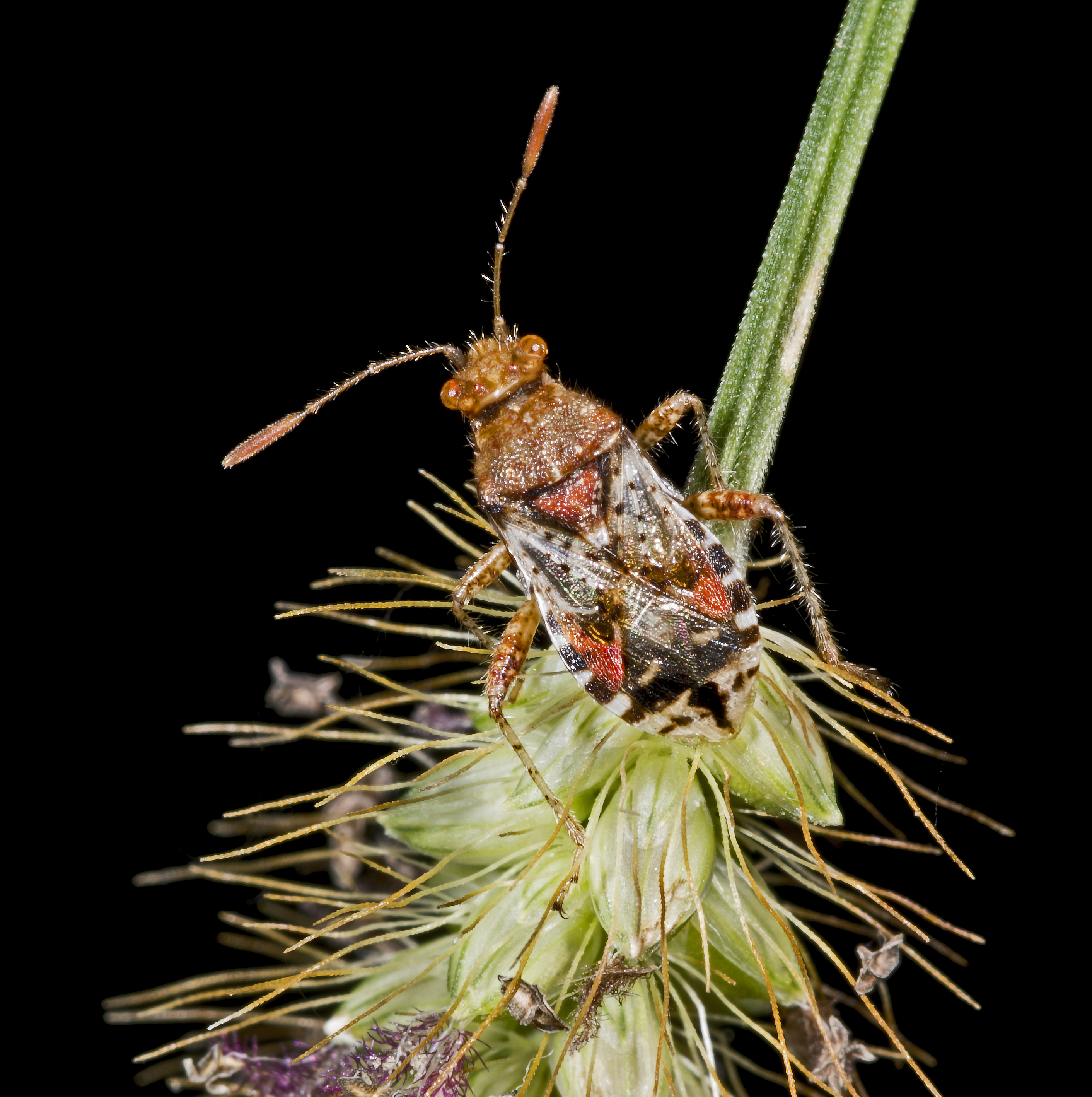

Scientific classification
- Domain: Eukaryota
- Kingdom: Animalia
- Phylum: Arthropoda
- Class: Insecta
- Order: Hemiptera
- Suborder: Heteroptera
- Family: Rhopalidae
- Genus: Rhopalus
- Species: R. subrufus

Binomial name
- Rhopalus subrufus (Gmelin, 1790)

= Rhopalus subrufus =

Species of true bug

Rhopalus subrufus is a species of scentless plant bugs belonging to the family Rhopalidae, subfamily Rhopalinae. It is found in most of Europe, but not Ireland and northern Scandinavia.

== Description ==
The total length of R. subrufus is about 7 millimetres (0.28 in). It can be distinguished for its membranous forewings and the connexivum with dark and light stripes.

It mainly feeds on Hypericum species, but also on many other plants.
