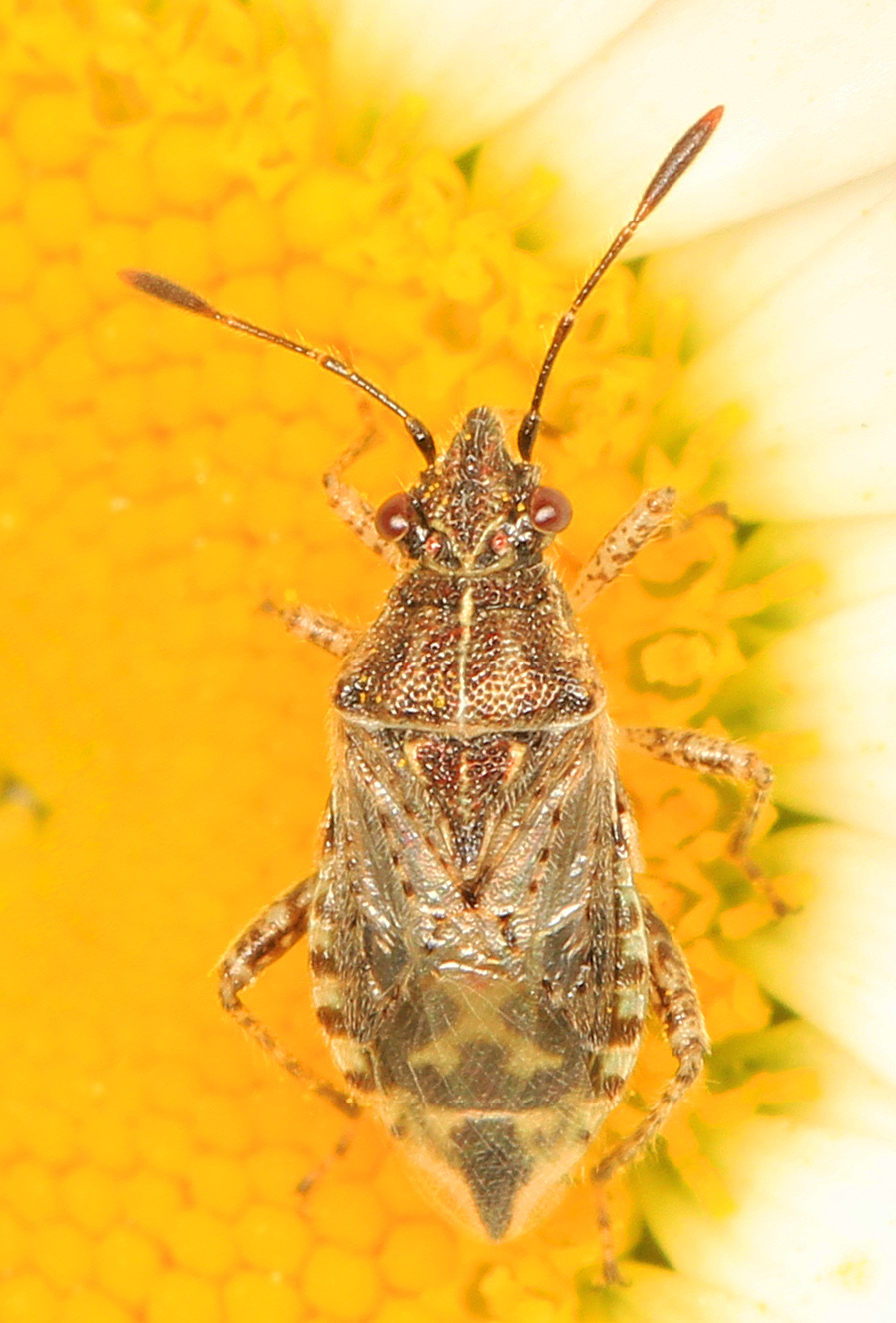
- Arhyssus species

Scientific classification
- Kingdom: Animalia
- Phylum: Arthropoda
- Class: Insecta
- Order: Hemiptera
- Suborder: Heteroptera
- Family: Rhopalidae
- Subfamily: Rhopalinae
- Tribe: Niesthreini
- Genus: Arhyssus; Stål, 1870

= Arhyssus =

Genus of true bugs

Arhyssus is a genus of scentless plant bugs in the family Rhopalidae. There are about 14 described species in Arhyssus.

== Species ==
- Arhyssus barberi Harris, 1942
- Arhyssus confusus Chopra, 1968
- Arhyssus crassus Harris, 1942
- Arhyssus distinctus Chopra, 1968
- Arhyssus hirtus (Torre-Bueno, 1912)
- Arhyssus lateralis (Say, 1825)
- Arhyssus longirostris Chopra, 1968
- Arhyssus nigristernum (Signoret, 1859)
- Arhyssus parvicornis (Signoret, 1859)
- Arhyssus punctatus (Signoret, 1859)
- Arhyssus schaeferi Chopra, 1968
- Arhyssus scutatus (Stål, 1859)
- Arhyssus usingeri Harris, 1942
- Arhyssus validus (Uhler, 1893)
