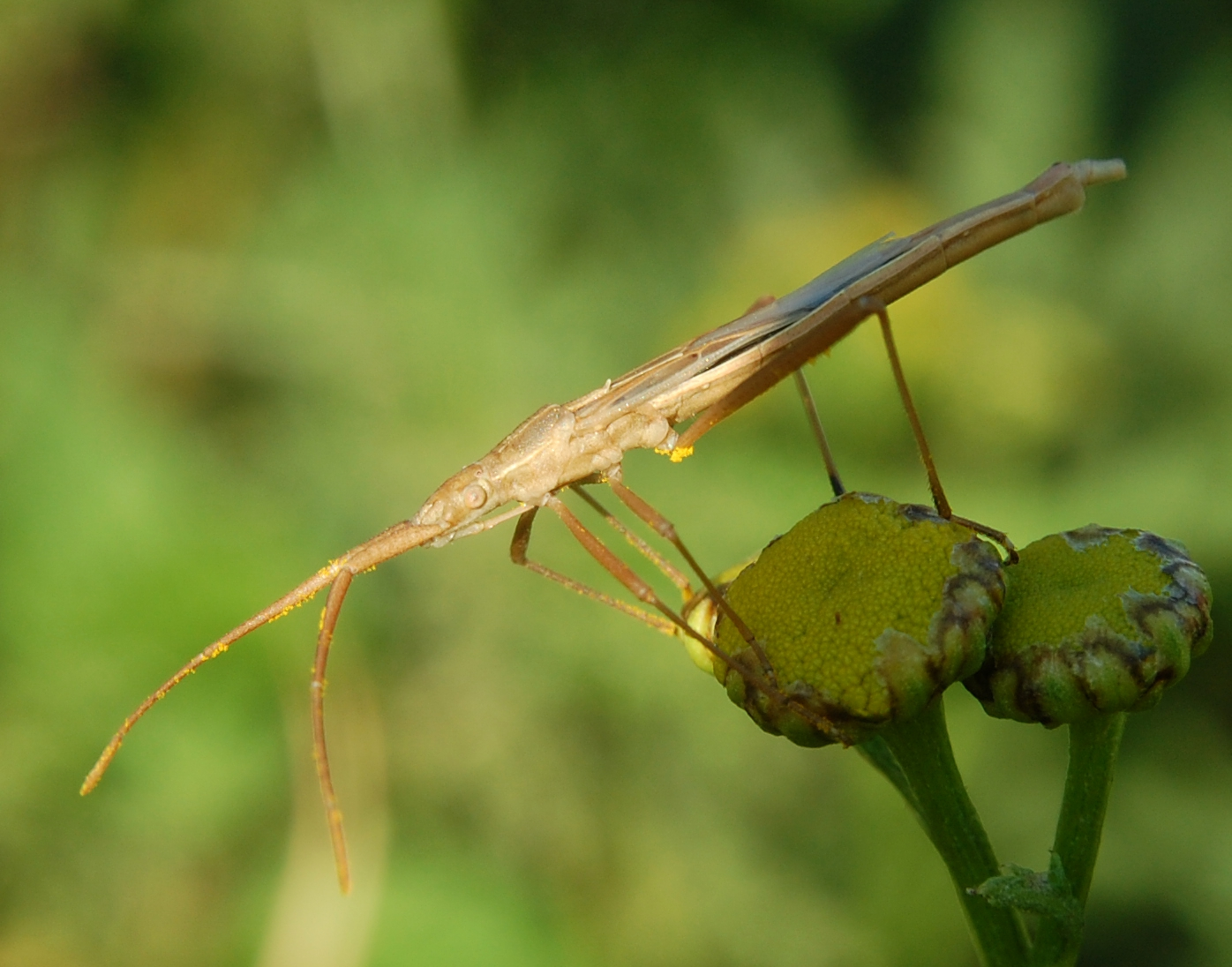

Scientific classification
- Domain: Eukaryota
- Kingdom: Animalia
- Phylum: Arthropoda
- Class: Insecta
- Order: Hemiptera
- Suborder: Heteroptera
- Family: Rhopalidae
- Tribe: Chorosomatini
- Genus: Chorosoma; Curtis, 1830

Synonyms
- Chaerosoma Spinola, 1837; Choerosoma Spinola, 1837

= Chorosoma =

Genus of true bugs

Chorosoma is a genus of true bugs belonging to the family Rhopalidae.

The genus was first described by John Curtis in 1830.

The species of this genus are found in Europe and Western Asia.

Species:

- Chorosoma gracile Josifov, 1968
- Chorosoma macilentum Stål, 1858
- Chorosoma schillingii (Schilling, 1829)
