= Stictopleurus punctiventris =

Scientific classification
- Domain: Eukaryota
- Kingdom: Animalia
- Phylum: Arthropoda
- Class: Insecta
- Order: Hemiptera
- Suborder: Heteroptera
- Family: Rhopalidae
- Genus: Stictopleurus
- Species: S. punctiventris

Binomial name
- Stictopleurus punctiventris (Dallas, 1852)

Species of true bug

Stictopleurus punctiventris is a species in the family Rhopalidae ("scentless plant bugs"), in the order Hemiptera ("true bugs, cicadas, hoppers, aphids and allies"). The distribution range of Stictopleurus punctiventris includes Central America and North America.
