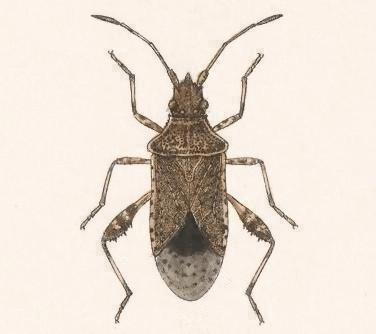

Scientific classification
- Domain: Eukaryota
- Kingdom: Animalia
- Phylum: Arthropoda
- Class: Insecta
- Order: Hemiptera
- Suborder: Heteroptera
- Family: Rhopalidae
- Genus: Harmostes
- Species: H. serratus

Binomial name
- Harmostes serratus (Fabricius, 1775)

= Harmostes serratus =

Species of true bug

Harmostes serratus is a species of scentless plant bug in the family Rhopalidae. It is found in Central America, North America, South America, and Mexico.
