= Arhyssus lateralis =

Scientific classification
- Domain: Eukaryota
- Kingdom: Animalia
- Phylum: Arthropoda
- Class: Insecta
- Order: Hemiptera
- Suborder: Heteroptera
- Family: Rhopalidae
- Genus: Arhyssus
- Species: A. lateralis

Binomial name
- Arhyssus lateralis (Say, 1825)

Species of true bug

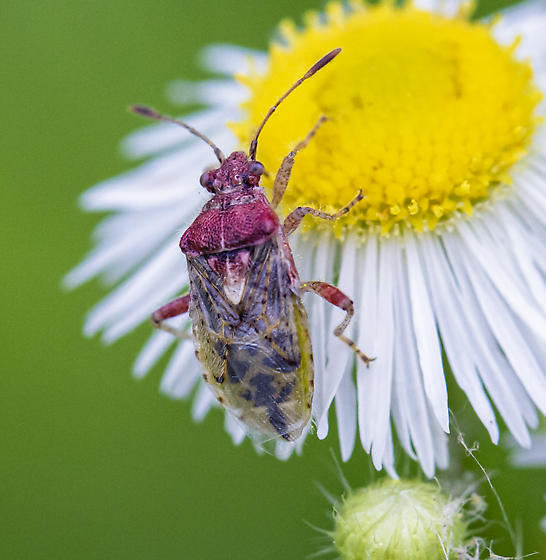
Scentless Plant Bug (Arhyssus lateralis) on flower

Arhyssus lateralis is a species of scentless plant bug in the family Rhopalidae. It is found in Central America and North America.
