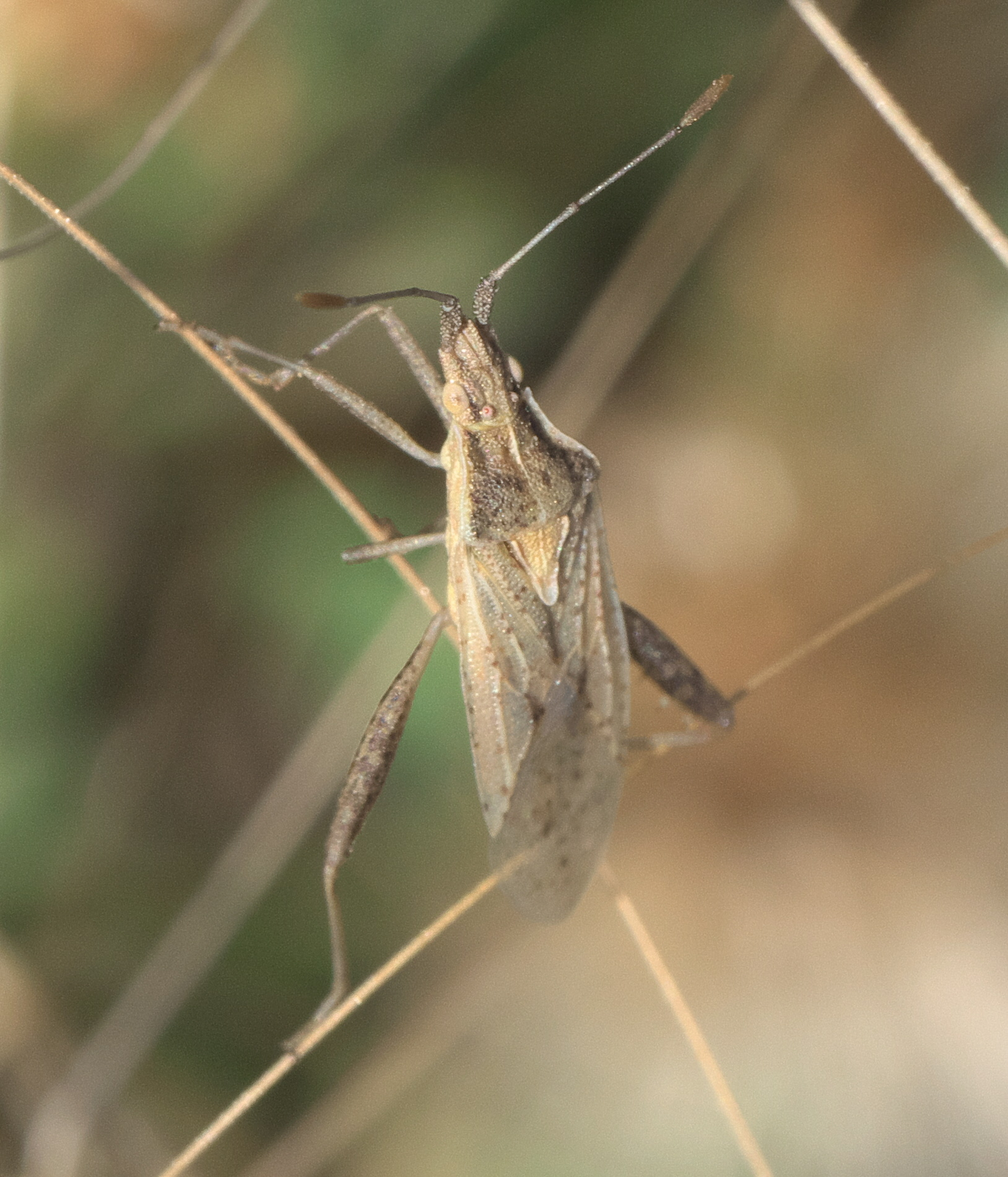

Scientific classification
- Domain: Eukaryota
- Kingdom: Animalia
- Phylum: Arthropoda
- Class: Insecta
- Order: Hemiptera
- Suborder: Heteroptera
- Family: Rhopalidae
- Genus: Harmostes
- Species: H. reflexulus

Binomial name
- Harmostes reflexulus (Say, 1832)

= Harmostes reflexulus =

Species of true bug

Harmostes reflexulus is a species of scentless plant bug in the family Rhopalidae. It is found in the Caribbean Sea, Central America, North America, and South America.

== Description ==
Harmostes reflexulus are small bugs. They can grow up to 8.3 mm (0.33 in).

== Ecology ==
Harmostes reflexulus are most commonly found on herbs and flowers in fields. Host plants include Senecio plattensis, Achillea millefolium and Erigeron strigosus. The insects will feed on the petioles and flowers of these plants.
