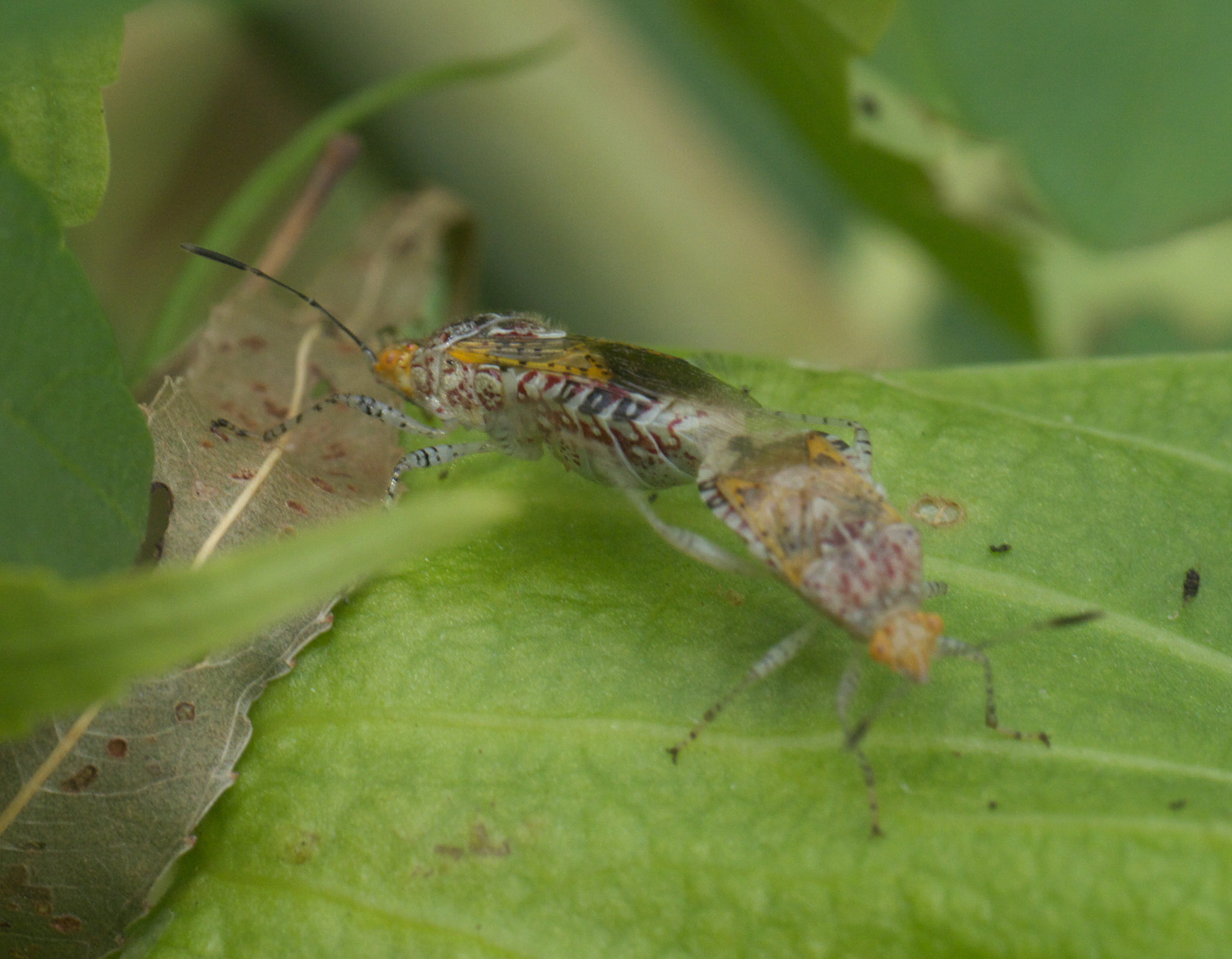
- Niesthrea louisianica

Scientific classification
- Domain: Eukaryota
- Kingdom: Animalia
- Phylum: Arthropoda
- Class: Insecta
- Order: Hemiptera
- Suborder: Heteroptera
- Family: Rhopalidae
- Subfamily: Rhopalinae
- Tribe: Niesthreini
- Genus: Niesthrea; Spinola, 1837

= Niesthrea =

Genus of true bugs

Niesthrea is a genus of scentless plant bugs in the family Rhopalidae. There are about 13 described species in Niesthrea.

== Species ==
These 13 species belong to the genus Niesthrea:

- Niesthrea agnes Chopra, 1973
- Niesthrea ashlocki Froeschner, 1989
- Niesthrea brevicauda Chopra, 1973
- Niesthrea dentatus Chopra, 1973
- Niesthrea dignus Chopra, 1973
- Niesthrea fenestratus (Signoret, 1859)
- Niesthrea josei Göllner-Scheiding, 1989
- Niesthrea louisianica Sailer, 1961
- Niesthrea pictipes (Stål, 1859)
- Niesthrea sidae (Fabricius, 1794)
- Niesthrea similis Chopra, 1973
- Niesthrea ventralis (Signoret, 1859)
- Niesthrea vincentii (Westwood, 1842)
