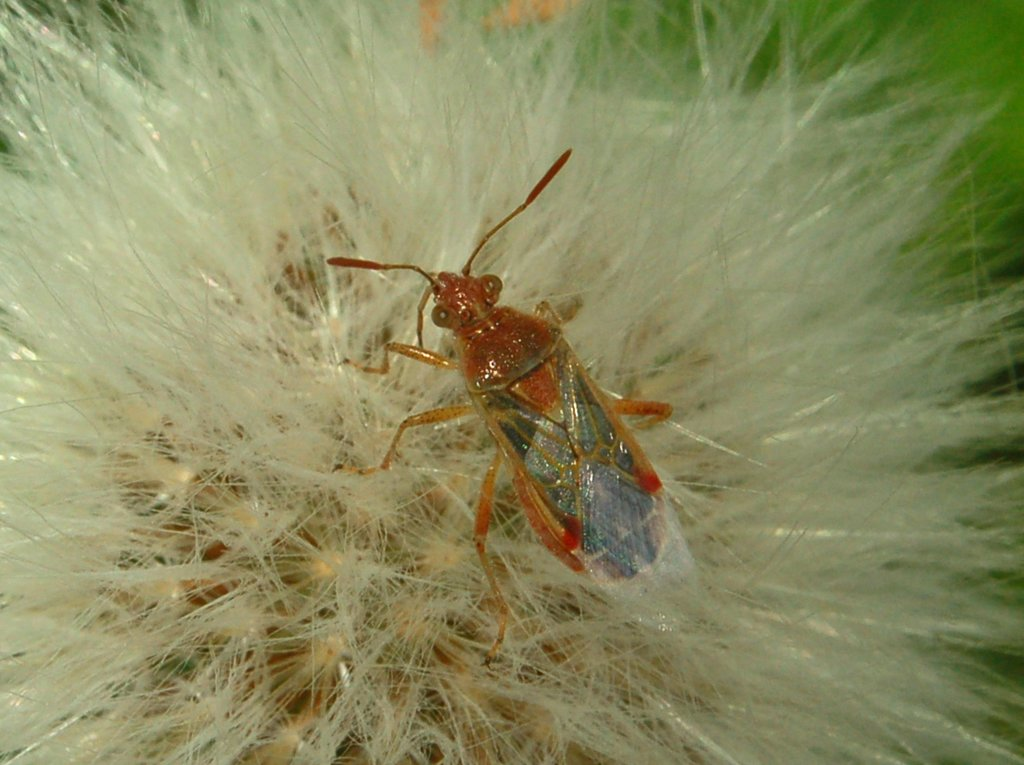
- Liorhyssus hyalinus

Scientific classification
- Kingdom: Animalia
- Phylum: Arthropoda
- Clade: Pancrustacea
- Class: Insecta
- Order: Hemiptera
- Suborder: Heteroptera
- Family: Rhopalidae
- Subfamily: Rhopalinae
- Tribe: Rhopalini
- Genus: Liorhyssus; Stål, 1870

= Liorhyssus =

Genus of true bugs

Liorhyssus is a genus of scentless plant bugs belonging to the family Rhopalidae, subfamily Rhopalinae.

== Species ==
The Coreoidea Species File lists:

1. Liorhyssus eckerleini Göllner-Scheiding, 1976
2. Liorhyssus finitoris Grillo & Alayo, 1978
3. Liorhyssus flavomaculatus (Signoret, 1859)
4. Liorhyssus hessei Göllner-Scheiding, 1976
5. Liorhyssus hyalinus (Fabricius, 1794)
6. Liorhyssus kaltenbachi Göllner-Scheiding, 1976
7. Liorhyssus lineatoventris (Spinola, 1852)
8. Liorhyssus natalensis (Stål, 1855)
9. Liorhyssus pararubricosus Göllner-Scheiding, 1984
10. Liorhyssus rubicundus (Signoret, 1859)
11. Liorhyssus rubricosus (Bolivar, 1879)
12. Liorhyssus slateri Göllner-Scheiding, 1976
