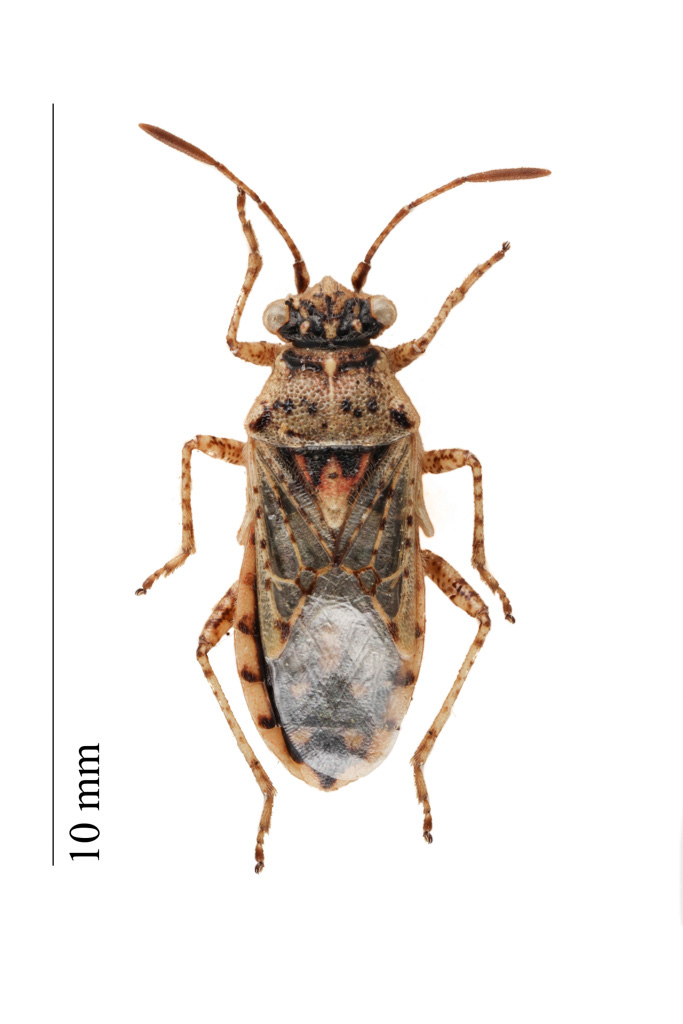
- Brachycarenus tigrinus

Scientific classification
- Kingdom: Animalia
- Phylum: Arthropoda
- Clade: Pancrustacea
- Class: Insecta
- Order: Hemiptera
- Suborder: Heteroptera
- Family: Rhopalidae
- Subfamily: Rhopalinae
- Tribe: Rhopalini
- Genus: Brachycarenus; Fieber, 1860

= Brachycarenus =

Genus of true bugs

Brachycarenus is a genus of bugs in the family Rhopalidae and the tribe Rhopalini, erected by Franz Xaver Fieber in 1860. The species Brachycarenus tigrinus is recorded from much of Europe (but also Korea and North America); the British Isles, where it was a fairly recent (2003) introduction.

== Species ==
According to BioLib the following are included:

1. Brachycarenus languidus (Horváth, 1891)
2. Brachycarenus tigrinus (Schilling, 1829)

== See also ==
- List of heteropteran bugs recorded in Britain
