= Niesthrea sidae =

Scientific classification
- Domain: Eukaryota
- Kingdom: Animalia
- Phylum: Arthropoda
- Class: Insecta
- Order: Hemiptera
- Suborder: Heteroptera
- Family: Rhopalidae
- Genus: Niesthrea
- Species: N. sidae

Binomial name
- Niesthrea sidae (Fabricius, 1794)

Synonyms
- Lygaeus sidae Fabricius, 1794

Species of true bug

Niesthrea sidae is a species of scentless plant bug in the family Rhopalidae. It is found in the Caribbean Sea, Central America, North America, and South America.
