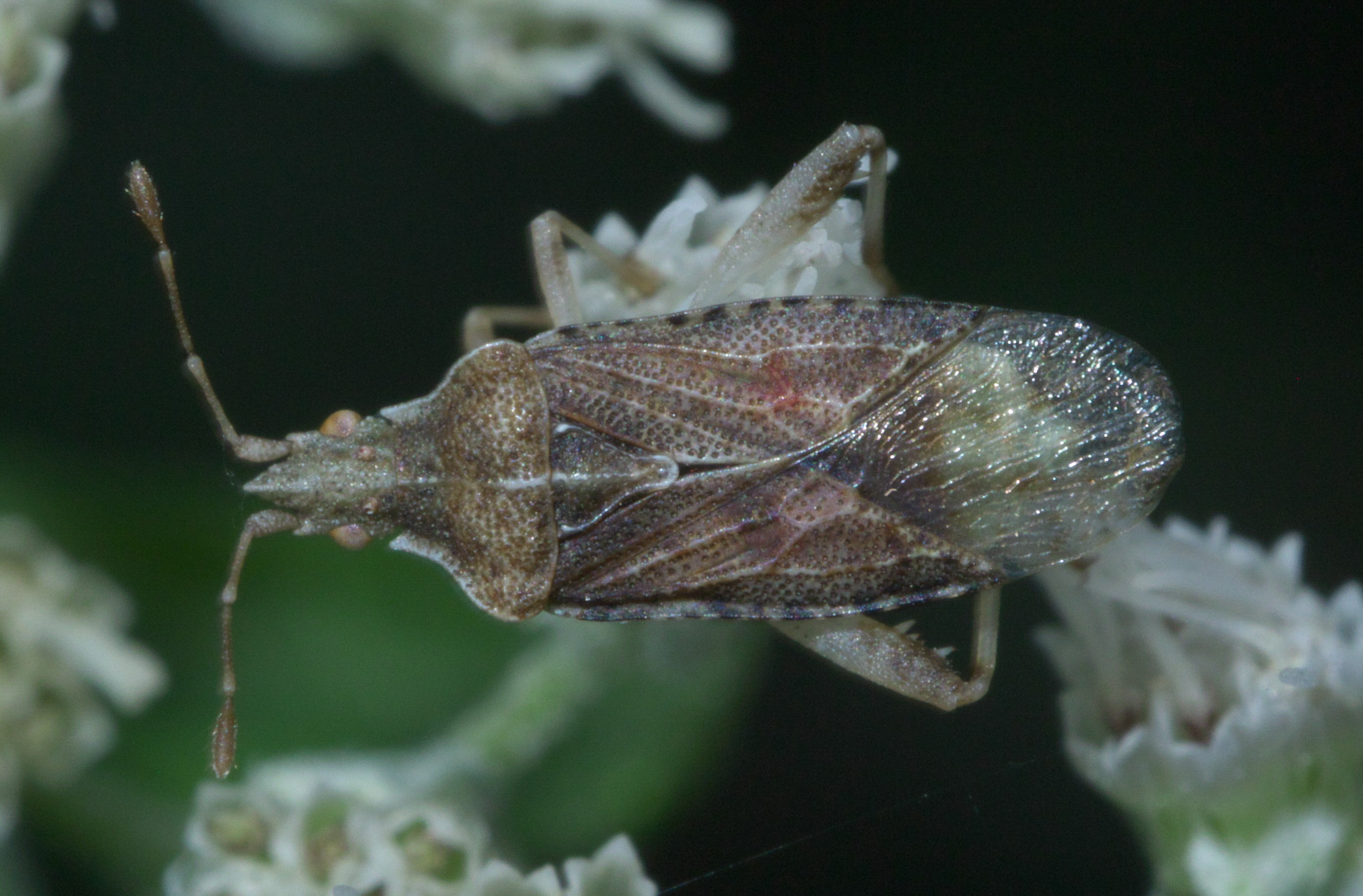

Scientific classification
- Domain: Eukaryota
- Kingdom: Animalia
- Phylum: Arthropoda
- Class: Insecta
- Order: Hemiptera
- Suborder: Heteroptera
- Family: Rhopalidae
- Genus: Harmostes
- Species: H. fraterculus

Binomial name
- Harmostes fraterculus (Say, 1832)

= Harmostes fraterculus =

Species of true bug

Harmostes fraterculus is a species of scentless plant bug in the family Rhopalidae. It is found in the Caribbean, Central America, and North America.

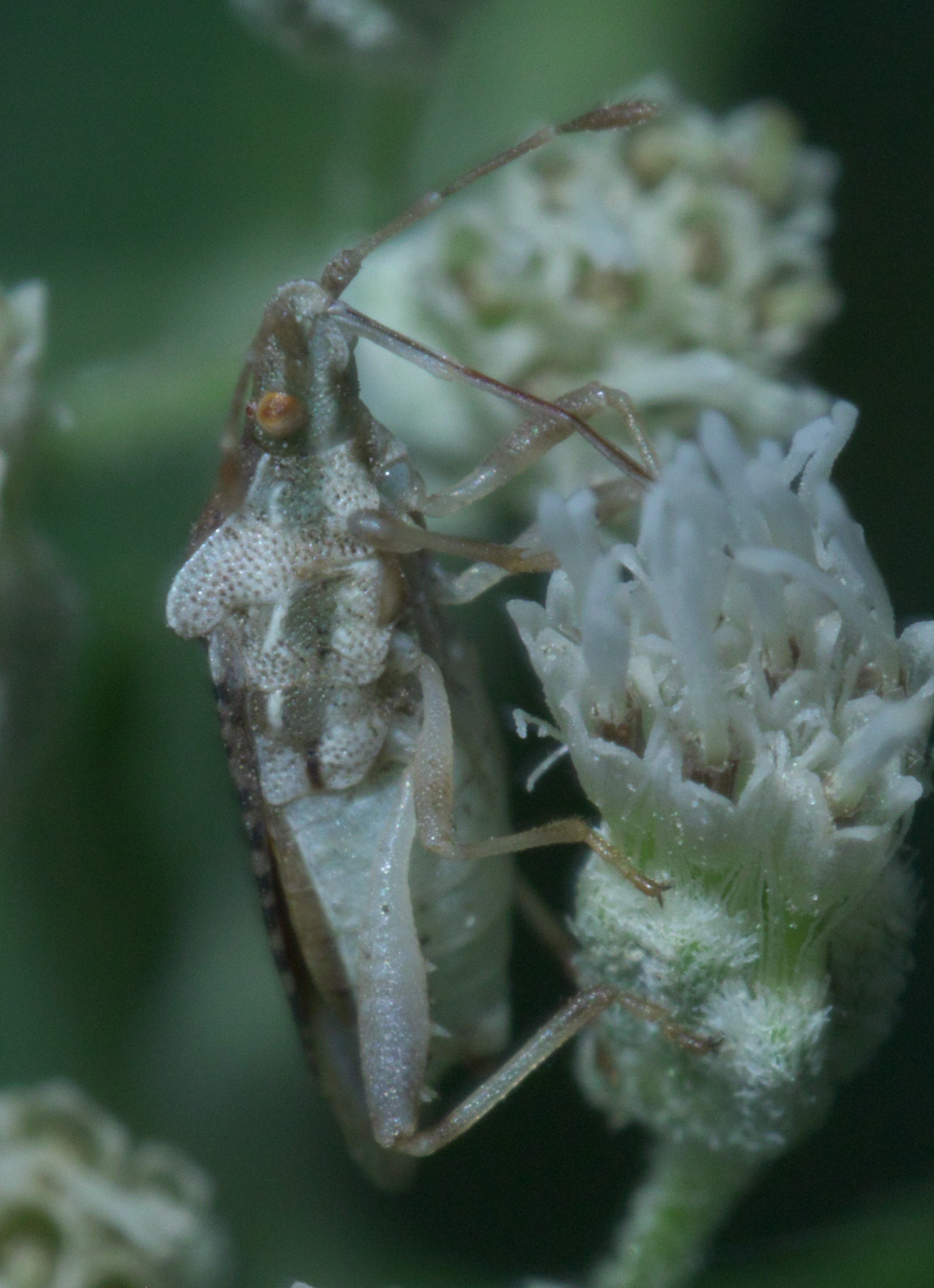
Harmostes fraterculus, Pryor, OK, US

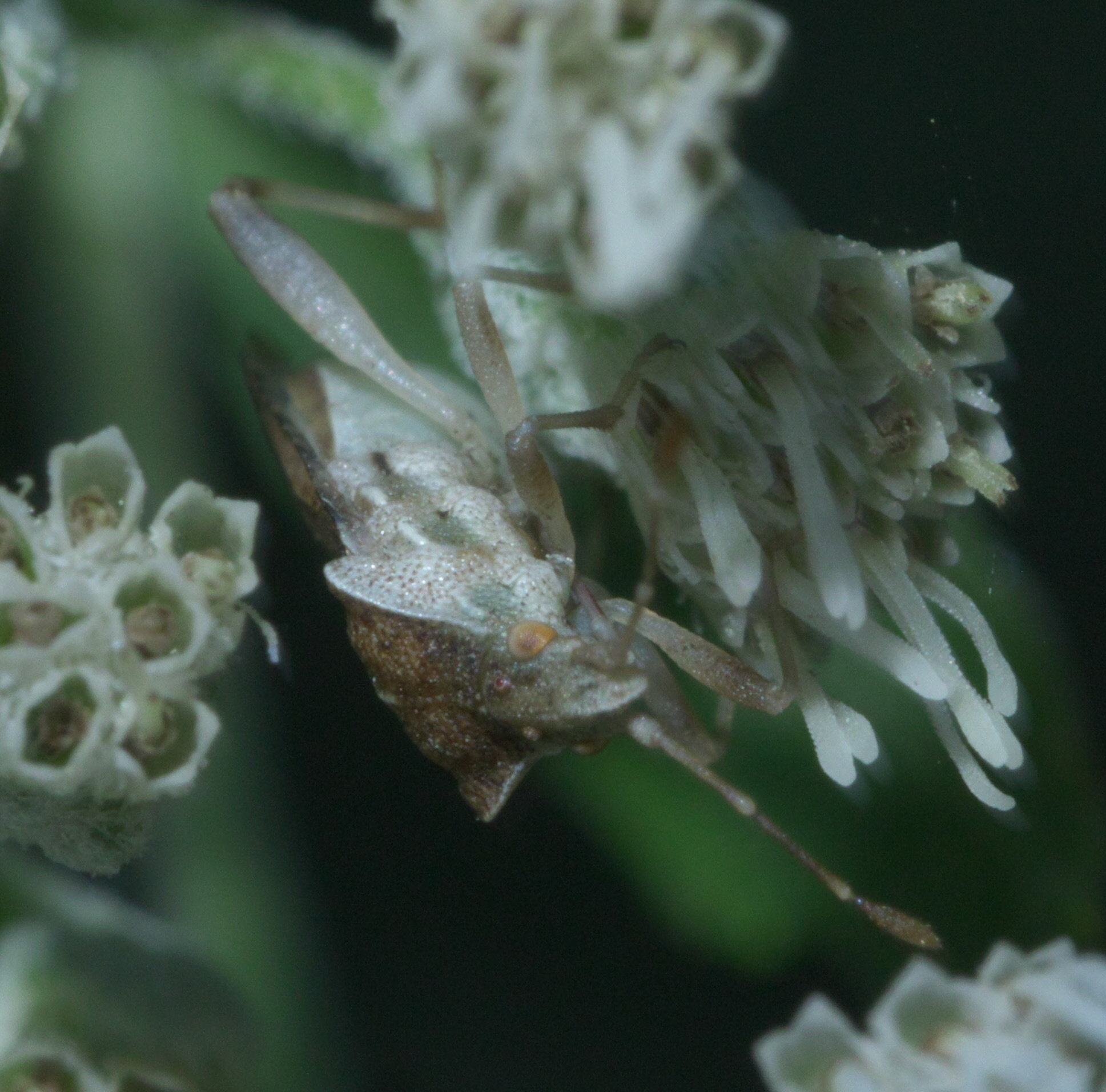
Harmostes fraterculus, Pryor, OK, US
