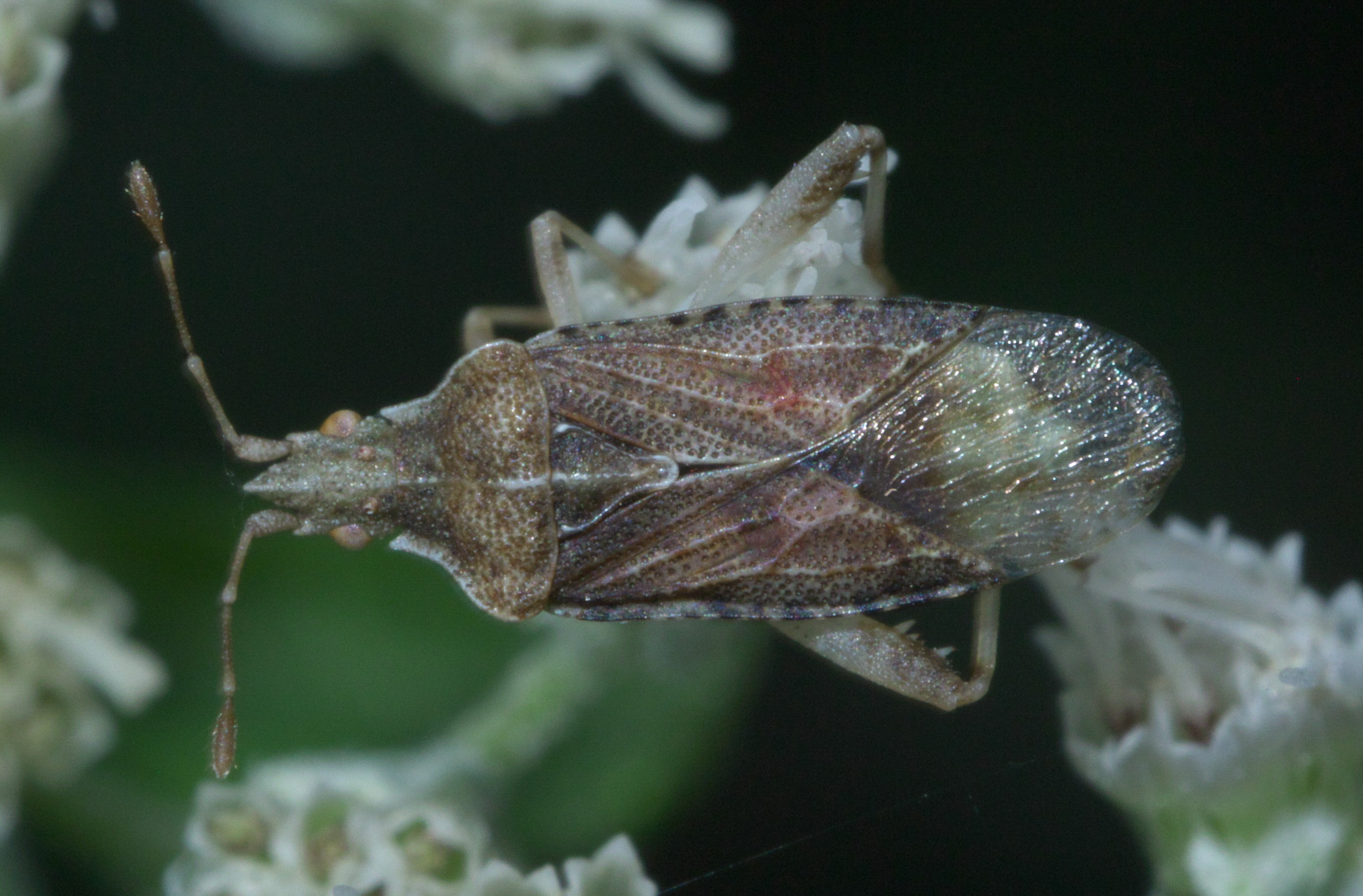
- Harmostes fraterculus

Scientific classification
- Kingdom: Animalia
- Phylum: Arthropoda
- Class: Insecta
- Order: Hemiptera
- Suborder: Heteroptera
- Family: Rhopalidae
- Tribe: Harmostini
- Genus: Harmostes; Burmeister, 1835

= Harmostes =

Genus of true bugs

Harmostes is a genus of scentless plant bugs in the family Rhopalidae. There are about seven described species in Harmostes.

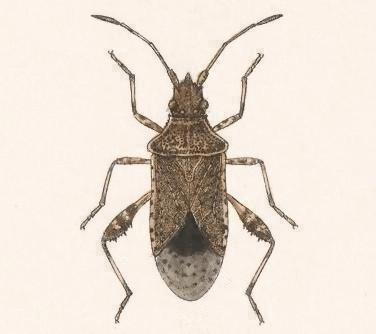
Harmostes serratus

== Species ==
- Harmostes angustatus Van Duzee, 1918
- Harmostes dorsalis Burmeister, 1835
- Harmostes formosus Distant, 1881
- Harmostes fraterculus (Say, 1832)
- Harmostes obliquus (Say, 1832)
- Harmostes reflexulus (Say, 1832)
- Harmostes serratus (Fabricius, 1775)
