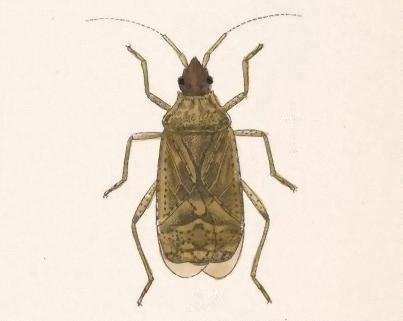

Scientific classification
- Kingdom: Animalia
- Phylum: Arthropoda
- Clade: Pancrustacea
- Class: Insecta
- Order: Hemiptera
- Suborder: Heteroptera
- Family: Rhopalidae
- Tribe: Harmostini
- Genus: Aufeius; Stål, 1870
- Species: A. impressicollis

Binomial name
- Aufeius impressicollis Stal, 1870

= Aufeius =

Genus of true bugs

Aufeius is a genus of scentless plant bugs in the family Rhopalidae. There is one described species in Aufeius, A. impressicollis.
