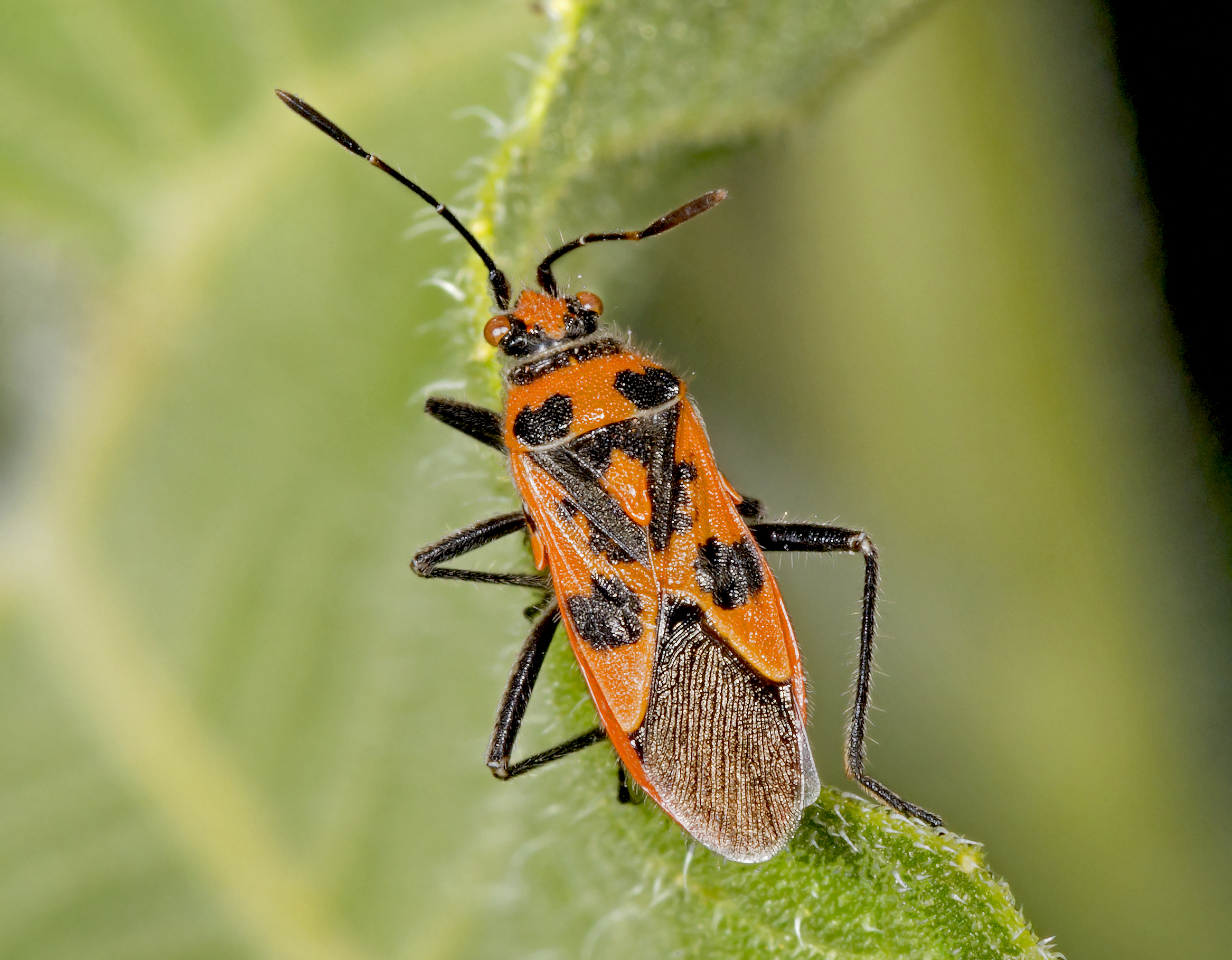
- Corizus hyoscyami

Scientific classification
- Kingdom: Animalia
- Phylum: Arthropoda
- Clade: Pancrustacea
- Class: Insecta
- Order: Hemiptera
- Suborder: Heteroptera
- Family: Rhopalidae
- Subfamily: Rhopalinae
- Tribe: Rhopalini; Amyot & Serville, 1843

Synonyms.
- Maccevethini Chopra

= Rhopalini =

Tribe of true bugs

Rhopalini is a tribe of insects in the subfamily Rhopalinae, family Rhopalidae, order Hemiptera.

== Genera ==
BioLib includes:

1. Brachycarenus Fieber, 1860
2. Corizus Fallén, 1814
3. Limacocarenus Kiritshenko, 1914
4. Liorhyssus Stål, 1870
5. Maccevethus Dallas, 1852
6. Punjentorhopalus Ahmad & Rizvi, 1999
7. Rhopalus Schilling, 1827
8. Stictopleurus Stål, 1872
