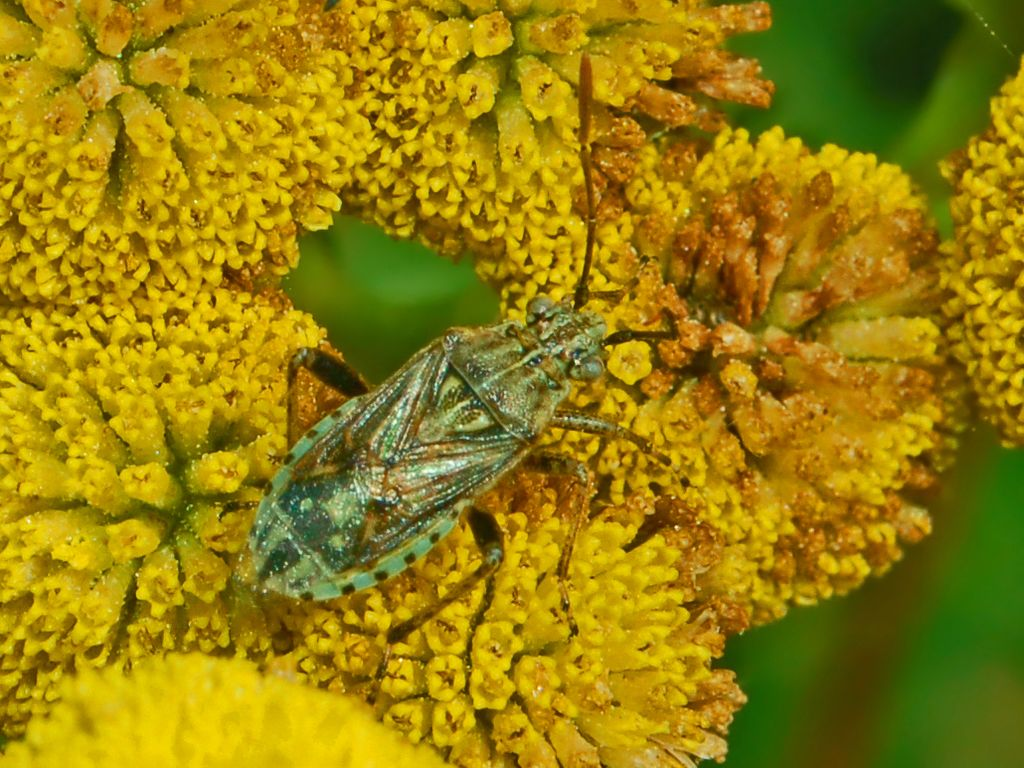
- Stictopleurus subtomentosus

Scientific classification
- Domain: Eukaryota
- Kingdom: Animalia
- Phylum: Arthropoda
- Class: Insecta
- Order: Hemiptera
- Suborder: Heteroptera
- Family: Rhopalidae
- Subfamily: Rhopalinae
- Tribe: Rhopalini
- Genus: Stictopleurus; Stål, 1872

= Stictopleurus =

Genus of true bugs

Stictopleurus sp. in copula

Stictopleurus is a genus of scentless plant bugs belonging to the family Rhopalidae, subfamily Rhopalinae.

== Species ==
- Stictopleurus abutilon (Rossi, 1790)
- Stictopleurus crassicornis (Linnaeus, 1758)
- Stictopleurus intermedius (Baker, 1908)
- Stictopleurus knighti Harris, 1942
- Stictopleurus pictus (Fieber, 1861)
- Stictopleurus plutonius (Baker, 1908)
- Stictopleurus punctatonervosus (Goeze, 1778)
- Stictopleurus punctiventris (Dallas, 1852)
- Stictopleurus ribauti Vidal, 1952
- Stictopleurus ribesi Göllner-Scheiding, 1975
- Stictopleurus sericeus (Horváth, 1896)
- Stictopleurus subtomentosus (Rey, 1888)
- Stictopleurus synavei Göllner-Scheiding, 1975
- Stictopleurus unicolor (Jakovlev, 1873)
- Stictopleurus viridicatus (Uhler, 1872)
