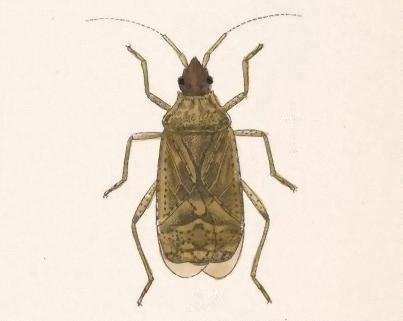
- Aufeius impressicollis

Scientific classification
- Kingdom: Animalia
- Phylum: Arthropoda
- Clade: Pancrustacea
- Class: Insecta
- Order: Hemiptera
- Suborder: Heteroptera
- Family: Rhopalidae
- Subfamily: Rhopalinae
- Tribe: Harmostini; Stål, 1873

= Harmostini =

Tribe of true bugs

Harmostini is a tribe of scentless plant bugs in the family Rhopalidae. There are at least two genera and about eight described species in Harmostini.

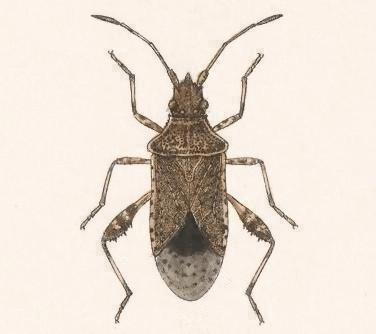
Harmostes serratus

== Genera ==
These two genera belong to the tribe Harmostini:

- Aufeius Stål, 1870^{i c g b}
- Harmostes Burmeister, 1835^{i c g b}

Data sources: i = ITIS, c = Catalogue of Life, g = GBIF, b = Bugguide.net
