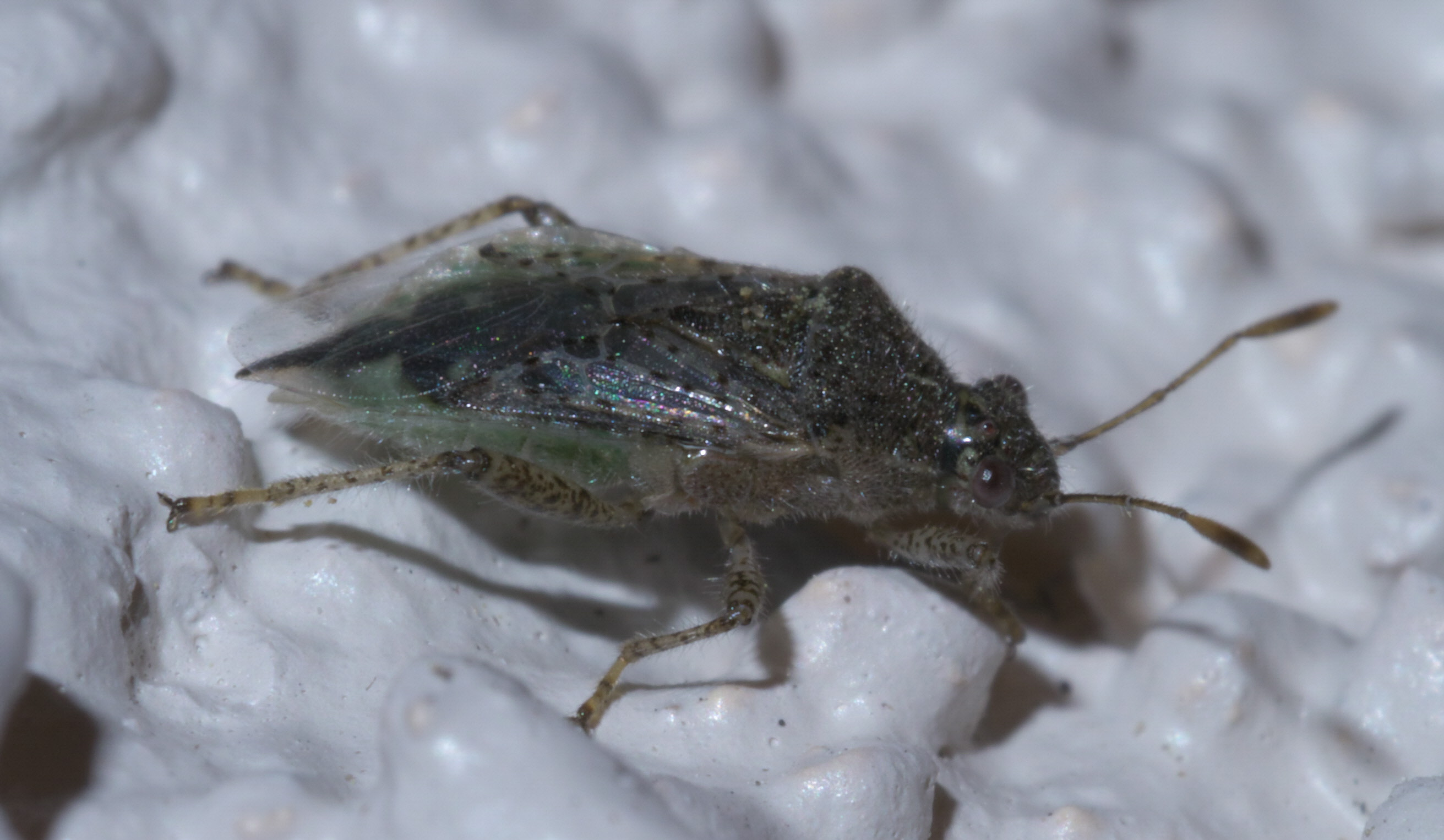
- Arhyssus

Scientific classification
- Domain: Eukaryota
- Kingdom: Animalia
- Phylum: Arthropoda
- Class: Insecta
- Order: Hemiptera
- Suborder: Heteroptera
- Family: Rhopalidae
- Subfamily: Rhopalinae
- Tribe: Niesthreini; Chopra, 1967

= Niesthreini =

Tribe of true bugs

Niesthreini is a tribe of scentless plant bugs in the family Rhopalidae. There are at least 2 genera and about 17 described species in Niesthreini.

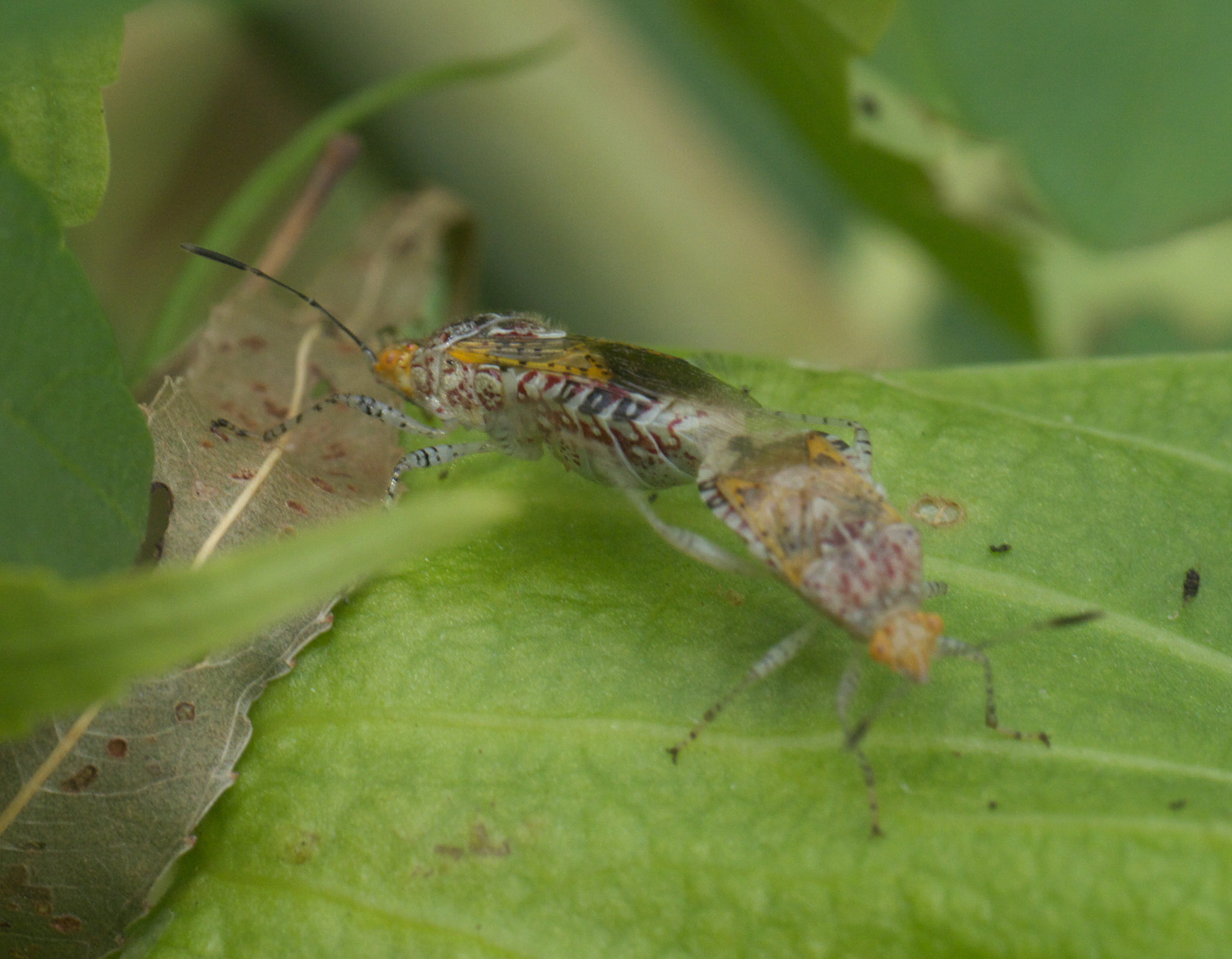
Niesthrea louisianica

== Genera ==
These two genera belong to the tribe Niesthreini:

- Arhyssus Stål, 1870^{i c g b}
- Niesthrea Spinola, 1837^{i c g b}

Data sources: i = ITIS, c = Catalogue of Life, g = GBIF, b = Bugguide.net
