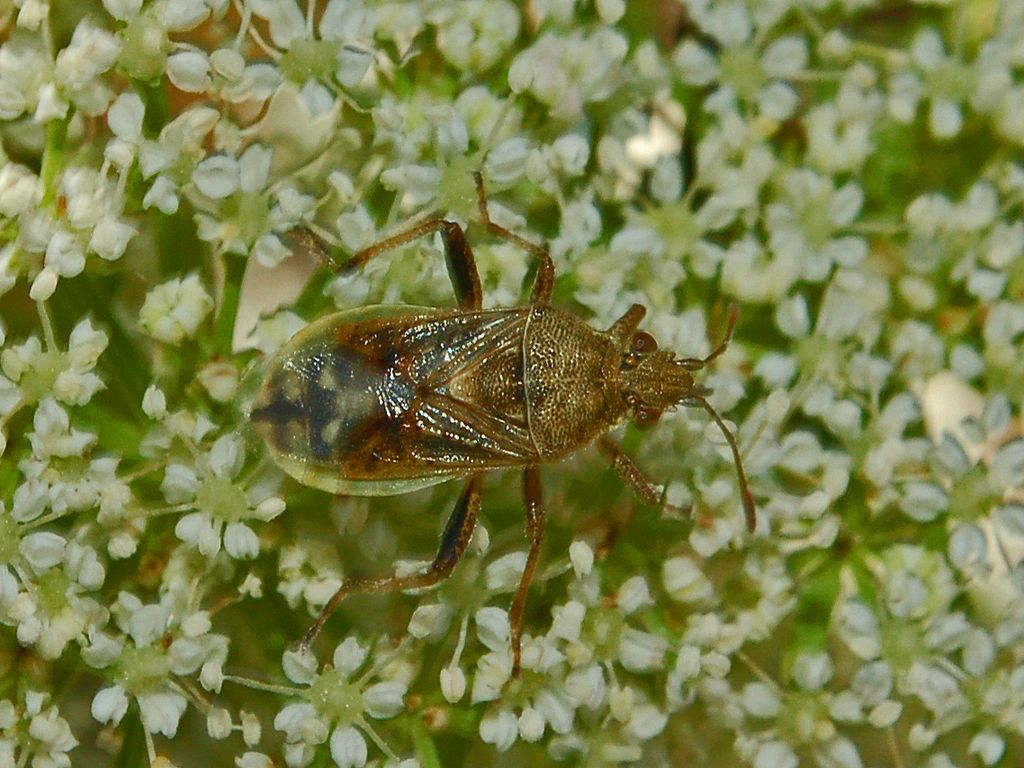
- Rhopalus lepidus

Scientific classification
- Domain: Eukaryota
- Kingdom: Animalia
- Phylum: Arthropoda
- Class: Insecta
- Order: Hemiptera
- Suborder: Heteroptera
- Family: Rhopalidae
- Tribe: Rhopalini
- Genus: Rhopalus; Schilling, 1827

= Rhopalus =

Genus of true bugs

Rhopalus is a genus of true bugs in the family Rhopalidae, the scentless plant bugs, recorded mostly from the Palaearctic realm: western Europe through to temperate and subtropical East Asia.

== Species ==
The Global Biodiversity Information Facility lists:

1. Rhopalus conspersus (Fieber, 1837)
2. Rhopalus distinctus (Signoret, 1859)
3. Rhopalus kerzhneri Göllner-Scheiding, 1984
4. Rhopalus latus (Jakovlev, 1883)
5. Rhopalus maculatus (Fieber, 1837)
6. Rhopalus nigricornis (Hsiao, 1965)
7. Rhopalus parumpunctatus Schilling, 1829
8. Rhopalus sapporensis (Matsumura, 1905)
9. Rhopalus spec (Gmelin, 1790)
10. Rhopalus subrufus (Gmelin, 1790)
11. Rhopalus tibetanus Liu & Zheng, 1989

Subgenus Rhopalus

1. Rhopalus lepidus Fieber, 1861
2. Rhopalus rufus Schilling, 1829

=== Formerly listed as Rhopalus ===
- Rhopalus tigrinus reclassified as Brachycarenus tigrinus (Schilling, 1829)
