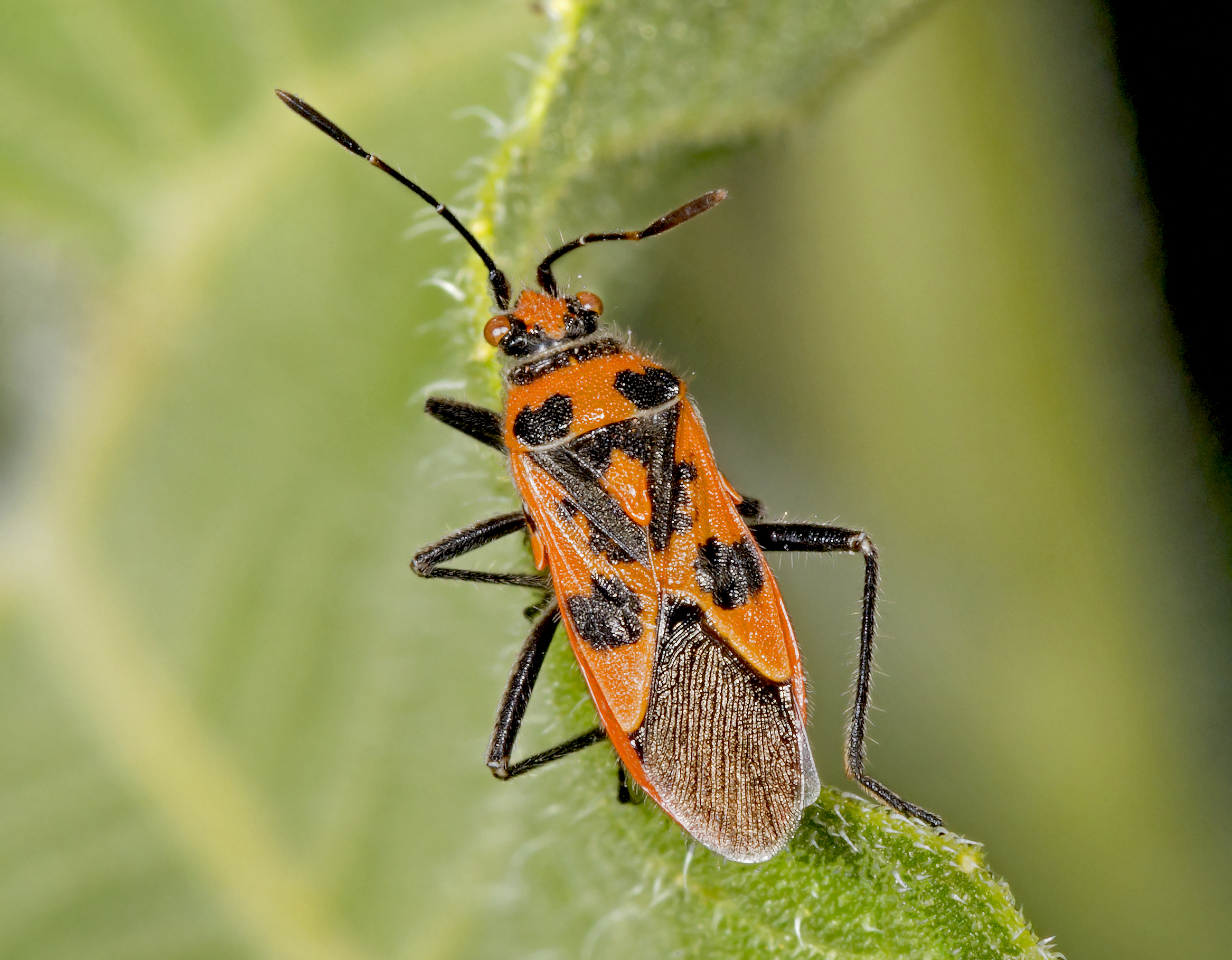
- Corizus hyoscyami

Scientific classification
- Domain: Eukaryota
- Kingdom: Animalia
- Phylum: Arthropoda
- Class: Insecta
- Order: Hemiptera
- Suborder: Heteroptera
- Family: Rhopalidae
- Subfamily: Rhopalinae; Amyot & Serville, 1843.

Tribes
- Chorosomatini; Corizomorphini; Harmostini; Niesthreini; Rhopalini

= Rhopalinae =

Subfamily of true bugs

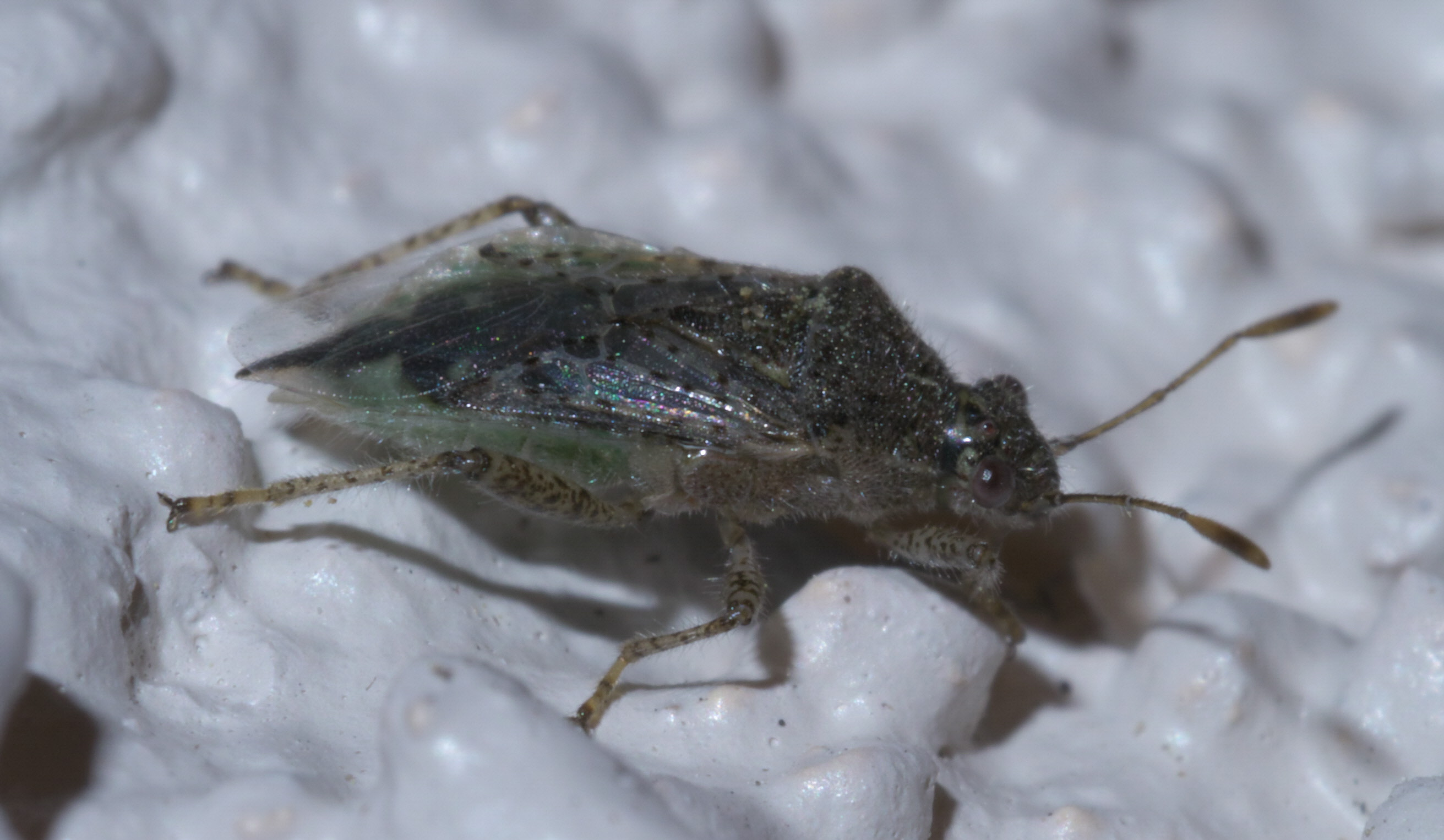
Arhyssus

Rhopalinae is a subfamily of scentless plant bugs in the family Rhopalidae. There are more than 170 described species in Rhopalinae.

== Tribes and Genera ==
The Coreoidea Species File lists:

=== Chorosomatini ===
Auth. Fieber, 1860

1. Agraphopus Stål, 1872
2. Chorosoma Curtis, 1830
3. Ithamar Kirkaldy, 1902
4. Leptoceraea Jakovlev, 1873
5. Myrmus Hahn, 1832
6. Xenogenus Berg, 1883

Corizomorphini

Auth. Kiritshenko, 1964; distribution: central Asia

1. Corizomorpha Jakovlev, 1883

=== Harmostini ===
Auth. Stål, 1873

1. Aufeius Stål, 1870
2. Harmostes Burmeister, 1835

=== Niesthreini ===
Auth. Chopra, 1967

1. Arhyssus Stål, 1870
2. Niesthrea Spinola, 1837
3. Peliochrous Stål, 1873

=== Rhopalini ===
Auth. Amyot & Serville, 1843

1. Brachycarenus Fieber, 1860
2. Corizus Fallén, 1814
3. Limacocarenus Kiritshenko, 1914
4. Liorhyssus Stål, 1870
5. Maccevethus Dallas, 1852
6. Punjentorhopalus Ahmad & Rizvi, 1999
7. Rhopalus Schilling, 1827
8. Stictopleurus Stål, 1872
