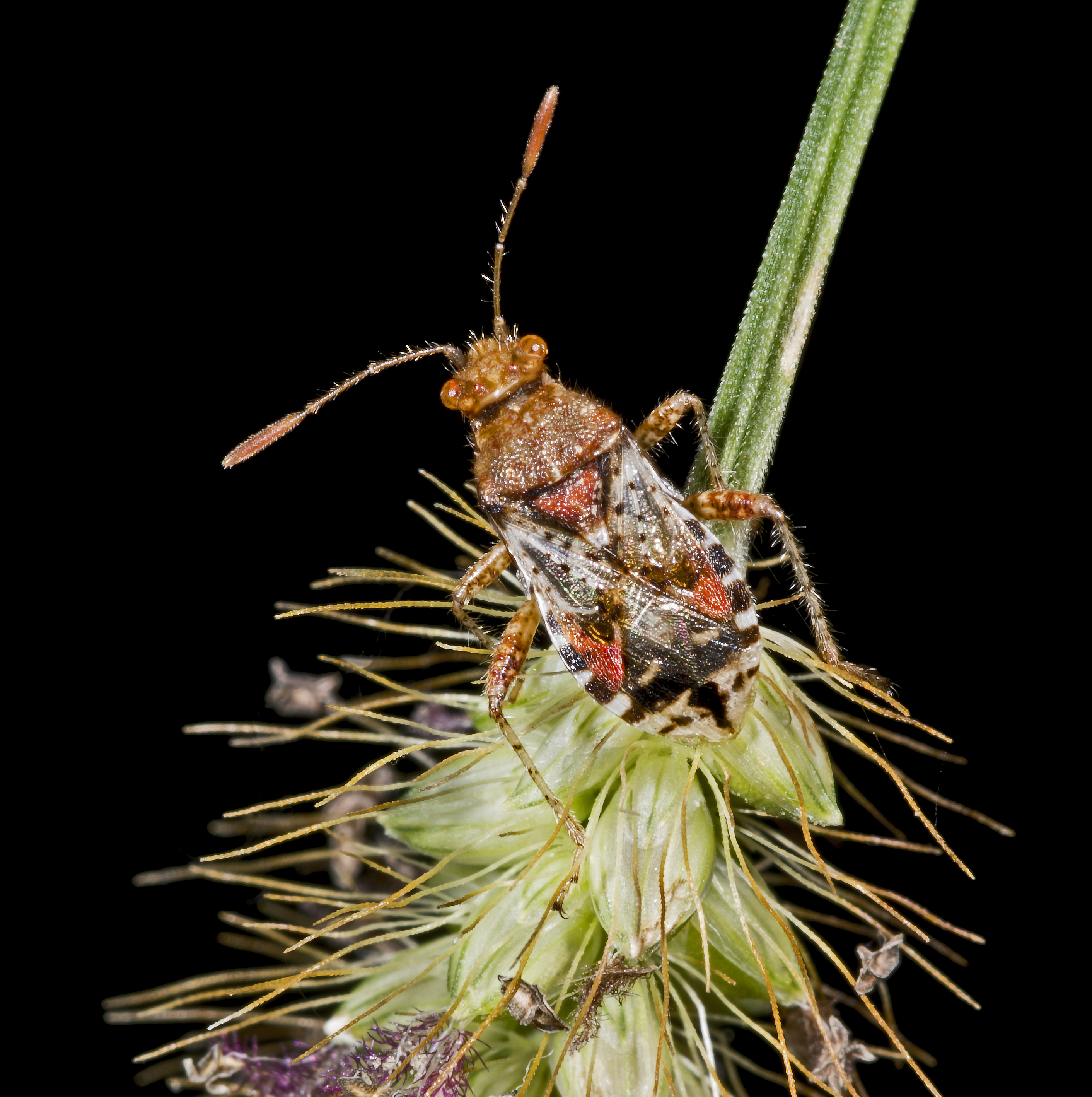
- Rhopalus subrufus

Scientific classification
- Kingdom: Animalia
- Phylum: Arthropoda
- Clade: Pancrustacea
- Class: Insecta
- Order: Hemiptera
- Suborder: Heteroptera
- Superfamily: Coreoidea
- Family: Rhopalidae; Amyot and Serville, 1843

Subfamilies
- Rhopalinae; Serinethinae

= Rhopalidae =

Rhopalidae Temporal range: Jurassic–Recent

Family of true bugs

Rhopalidae, or scentless plant bugs, are a family of true bugs. In older literature, the family is sometimes called "Corizidae". They differ from the related coreids in lacking well-developed scent glands. They are usually light-colored and smaller than coreids. Some are very similar to the orsilline lygaeids, but can be distinguished by the many veins in the membrane of the hemelytra. They live principally on weeds, but a few (including the boxelder bug) are arboreal. All are plant feeders. The type genus for the family is Rhopalus. Currently, 30 genera and over 240 species of rhopalids are known. The oldest fossil rhopalids described are from the Middle Jurassic of Inner Mongolia, discovered from the Haifanggou Formation. They are not considered economically important, with a few species being pests of ornamental trees.
