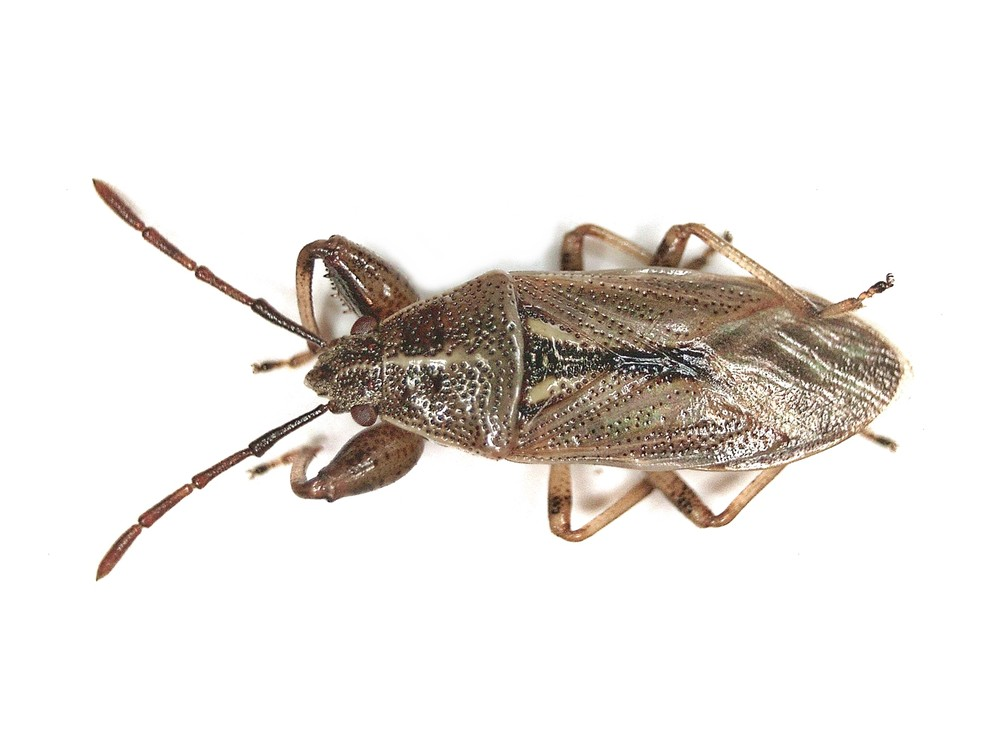

Scientific classification
- Kingdom: Animalia
- Phylum: Arthropoda
- Class: Insecta
- Order: Hemiptera
- Suborder: Heteroptera
- Family: Pachygronthidae
- Genus: Oedancala
- Species: O. dorsalis

Binomial name
- Oedancala dorsalis (Say, 1832)

= Oedancala dorsalis =

Species of true bug

Oedancala dorsalis is an insect, found in the superfamily Lygaeoidea (seed bugs) which is one of the largest varied superfamilies of Heteroptera, a suborder of Hemiptera.
