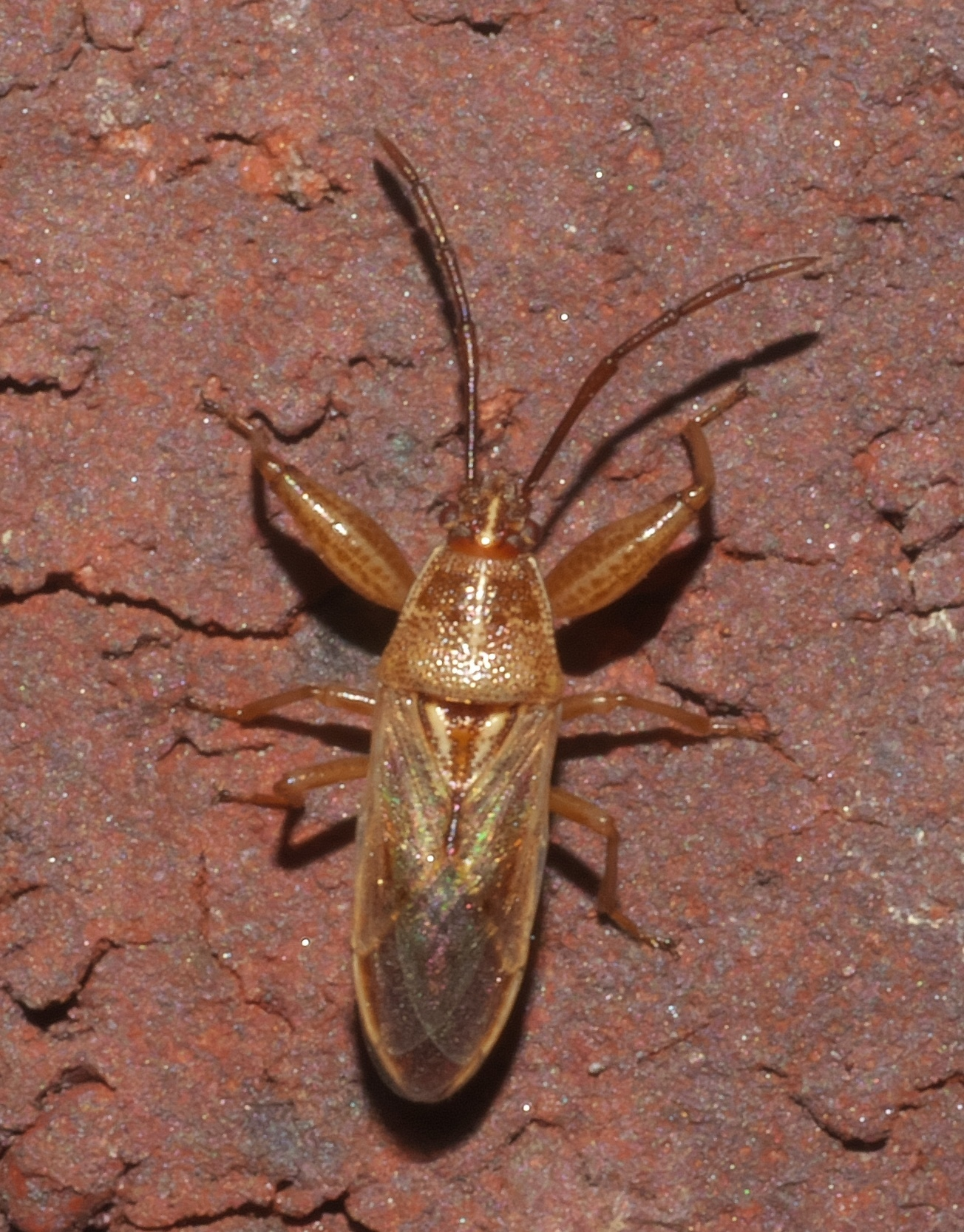

Scientific classification
- Kingdom: Animalia
- Phylum: Arthropoda
- Class: Insecta
- Order: Hemiptera
- Suborder: Heteroptera
- Family: Pachygronthidae
- Genus: Oedancala
- Species: O. crassimana

Binomial name
- Oedancala crassimana (Fabricius, 1803)

Synonyms
- Oedancala dorsilinea Amyot and Serville, 1843

= Oedancala crassimana =

Species of true bug

Oedancala crassimana is a species of true bug in the family Pachygronthidae. It is found in the Caribbean, North America, and South America.
