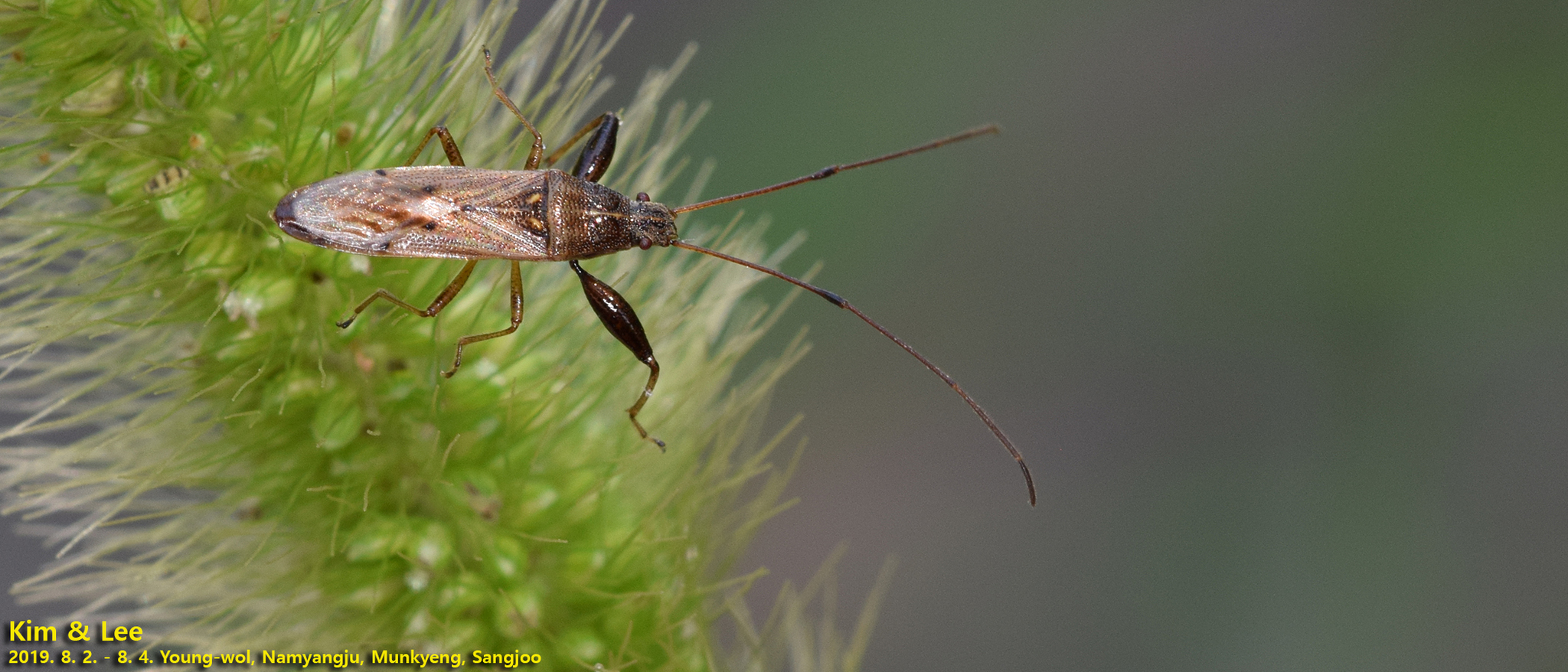
- Pachygrontha antennata, South Korea

Scientific classification
- Kingdom: Animalia
- Phylum: Arthropoda
- Clade: Pancrustacea
- Class: Insecta
- Order: Hemiptera
- Suborder: Heteroptera
- Family: Pachygronthidae
- Subfamily: Pachygronthinae
- Genus: Pachygrontha
- Species: P. antennata

Binomial name
- Pachygrontha antennata (Uhler, 1860)

= Pachygrontha antennata =

Species of insect

Pachygrontha antennata is a species of pentatomomorphan bug in the family Pachygronthidae, found mainly in Korea and Japan.

== Subspecies ==
These two subspecies belong to the species Pachygrontha antennata:

- Pachygrontha antennata antennata (Uhler, 1860)
- Pachygrontha antennata nigriventris Reuter, 1881
