= Phlegyas annulicrus =

Scientific classification
- Kingdom: Animalia
- Phylum: Arthropoda
- Clade: Pancrustacea
- Class: Insecta
- Order: Hemiptera
- Suborder: Heteroptera
- Family: Pachygronthidae
- Genus: Phlegyas
- Species: P. annulicrus

Binomial name
- Phlegyas annulicrus Stal, 1869

Species of true bug

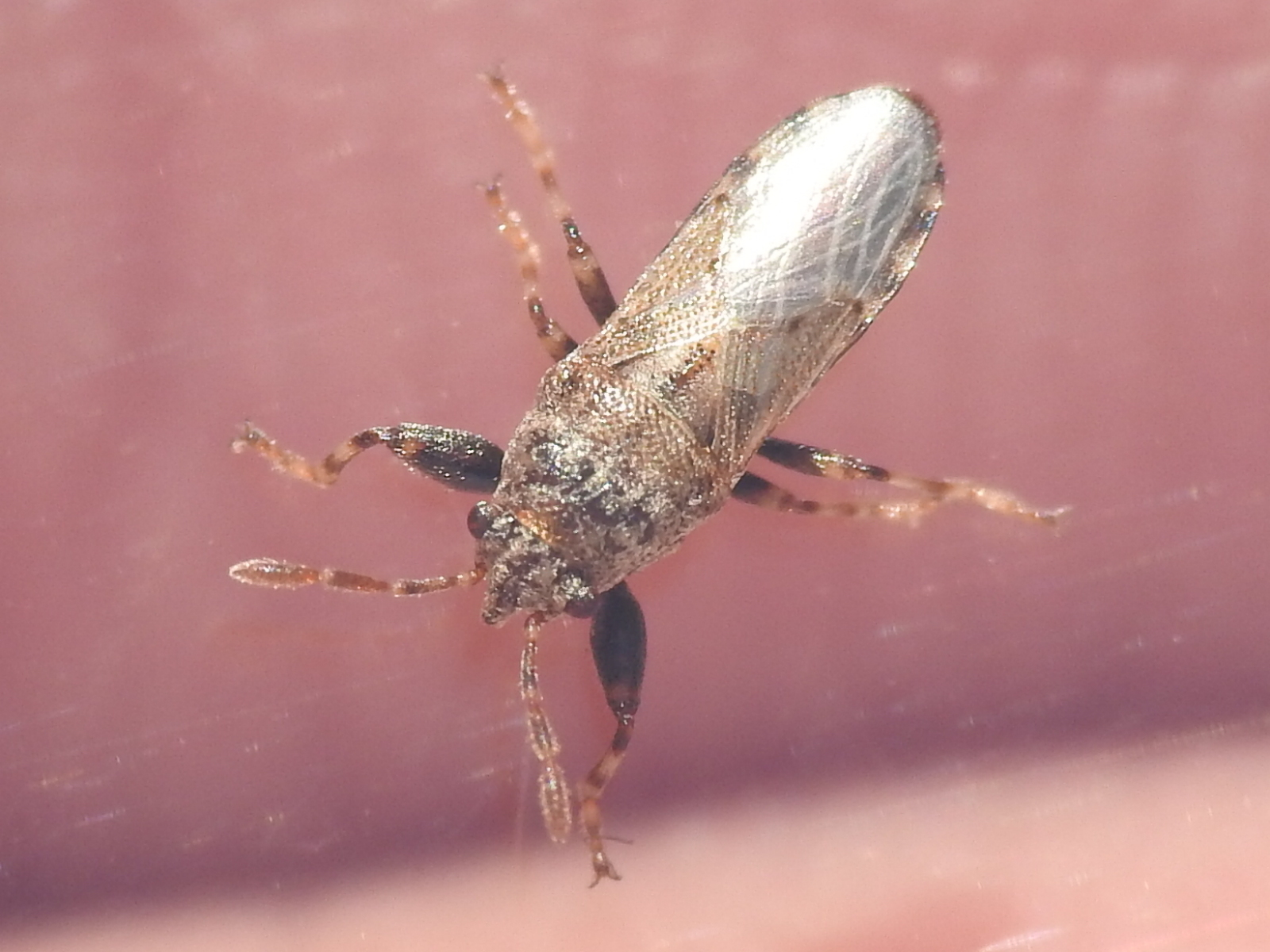
Phleygas annulicrus

Phlegyas annulicrus is a species of true bug in the family Pachygronthidae. It is found in Central America and North America.
