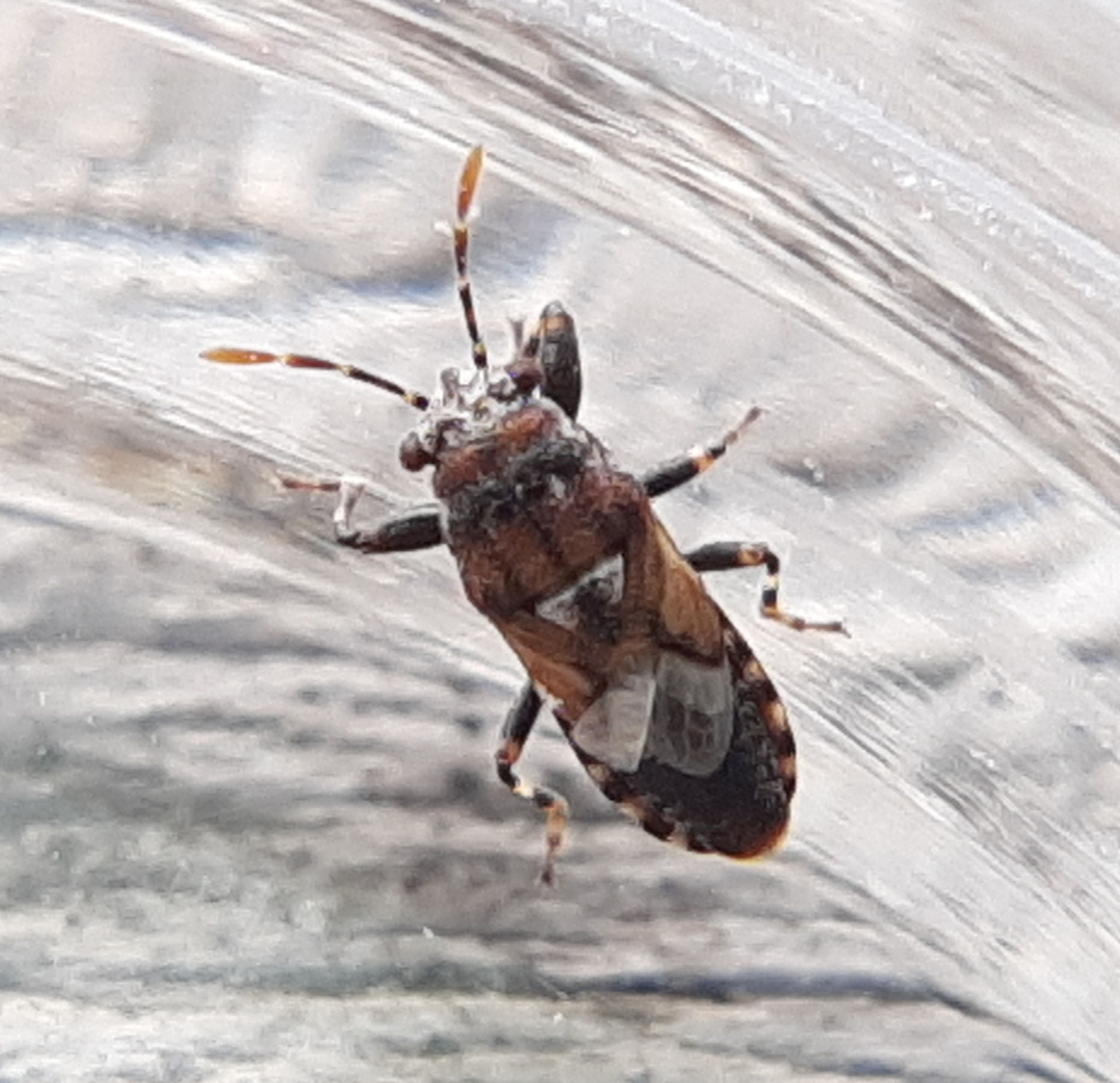
- Phlegyas abbreviatus

Scientific classification
- Domain: Eukaryota
- Kingdom: Animalia
- Phylum: Arthropoda
- Class: Insecta
- Order: Hemiptera
- Suborder: Heteroptera
- Family: Pachygronthidae
- Genus: Phlegyas
- Species: P. abbreviatus

Binomial name
- Phlegyas abbreviatus (Uhler, 1876)

= Phlegyas abbreviatus =

Species of true bug

Phlegyas abbreviatus is a species of true bug in the family Pachygronthidae. It is found in North America.
