= Phlegyas (bug) =

Scientific classification
- Kingdom: Animalia
- Phylum: Arthropoda
- Class: Insecta
- Order: Hemiptera
- Suborder: Heteroptera
- Family: Pachygronthidae
- Subfamily: Teracriinae
- Genus: Phlegyas; Stål, 1865

Synonyms
- Helonotocoris Lethierry, 1888; Peliopelta Uhler, 1886

Genus of true bugs

Phlegyas is a genus of North American true bugs in the family Pachygronthidae. There are at least three described species in Phlegyas.

== Species ==
These three species belong to the genus Phlegyas:

- Phlegyas abbreviatus (Uhler, 1876)^{i c g b}
- Phlegyas annulicrus Stal, 1869^{i c g b}
- Phlegyas patruelis Berg, C., 1883^{c g}

Data sources: i = ITIS, c = Catalogue of Life, g = GBIF, b = Bugguide.net
