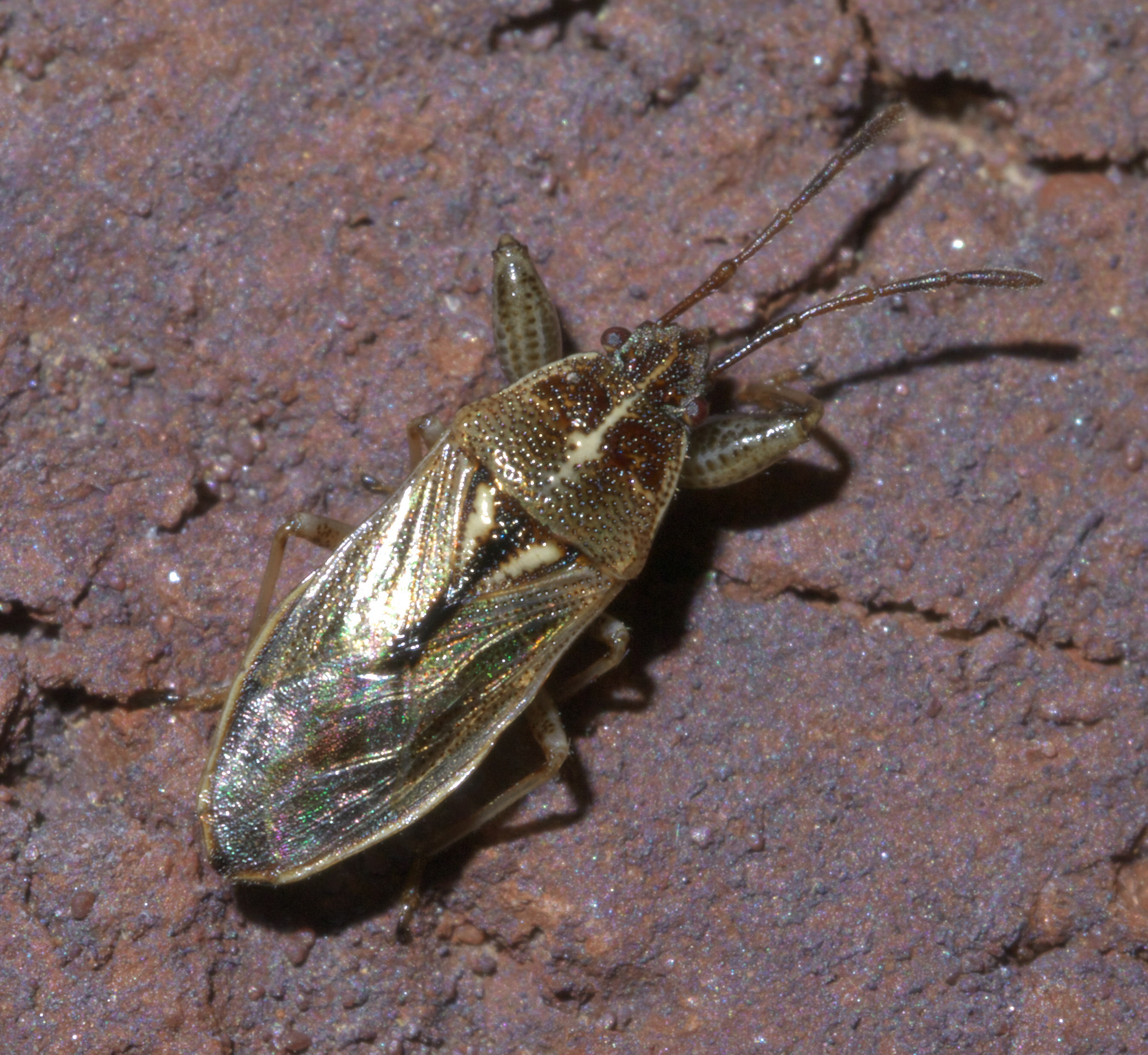
- Oedancala dorsalis

Scientific classification
- Kingdom: Animalia
- Phylum: Arthropoda
- Class: Insecta
- Order: Hemiptera
- Suborder: Heteroptera
- Family: Pachygronthidae
- Subfamily: Pachygronthinae
- Genus: Oedancala; Amyot & Serville, 1843

= Oedancala =

Genus of true bugs

Oedancala is a genus of true bugs in the family Pachygronthidae from the Americas. There are about 14 described species in Oedancala.

== Species ==
These 14 species belong to the genus Oedancala:

- Oedancala acuminata Slater, J.A., 1956^{c g}
- Oedancala bimaculata Distant, 1893^{i c g}
- Oedancala cladiumicola Baranowski, R.M. & J.A. Slater, 1989^{c g}
- Oedancala crassimana Fabricius, 1803^{i c g b}
- Oedancala cubana Stål, 1874^{i c g}
- Oedancala dorsalis Say, 1832^{i c g b}
- Oedancala husseyi Slater, J.A., 1955^{c g}
- Oedancala kormilevi Slater, J.A., 1955^{c g}
- Oedancala longirostris Slater, J.A., 1955^{c g}
- Oedancala meridionalis Stal, C., 1874^{c g}
- Oedancala mexicana Slater, J.A., 1955^{c g}
- Oedancala nana Slater, J.A., 1955^{c g}
- Oedancala notata Stal, C., 1874^{c g}
- Oedancala scutellata Baranowski, R.M. & J.A. Slater, 1982^{c g}

Data sources: i = ITIS, c = Catalogue of Life, g = GBIF, b = Bugguide.net
