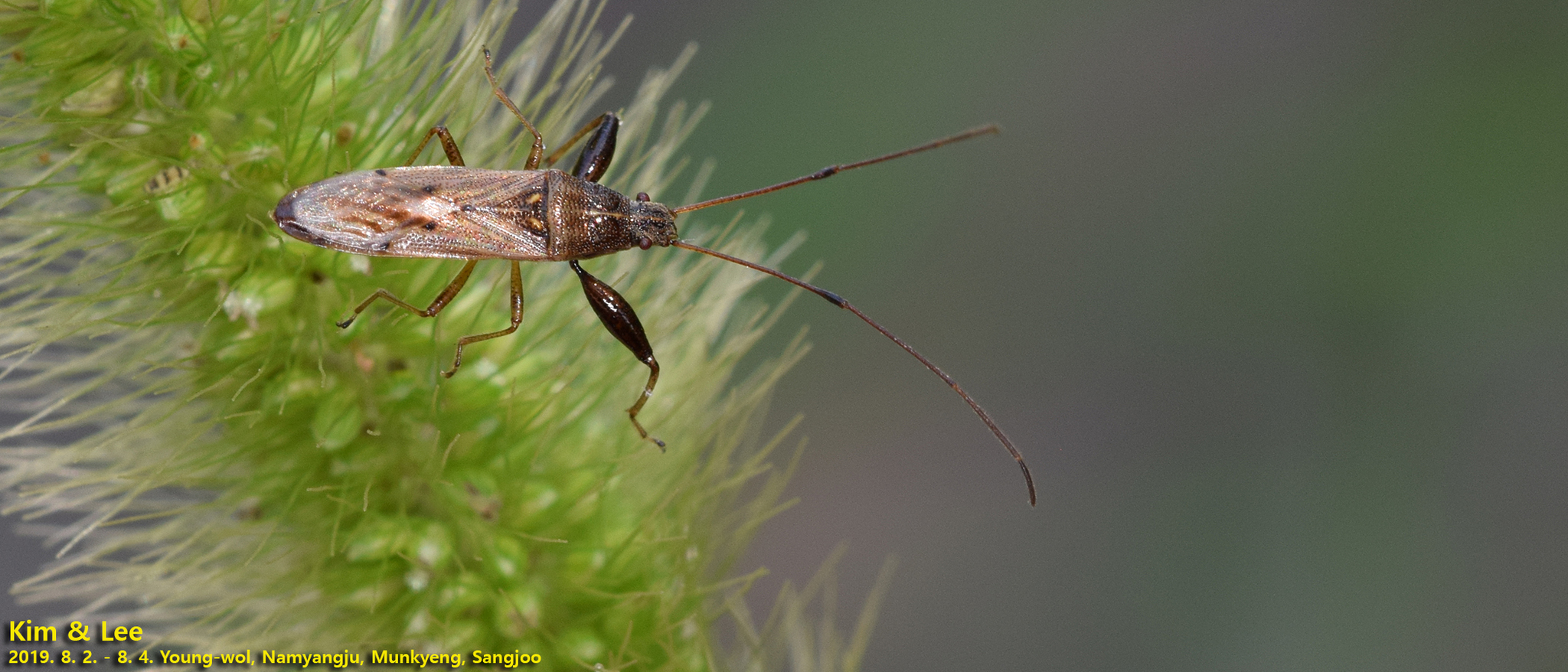
- Pachygrontha antennata, South Korea

Scientific classification
- Kingdom: Animalia
- Phylum: Arthropoda
- Class: Insecta
- Order: Hemiptera
- Suborder: Heteroptera
- Family: Pachygronthidae
- Subfamily: Pachygronthinae
- Genus: Pachygrontha; Germar, 1837

= Pachygrontha =

Genus of insects

Pachygrontha is a genus of seed bugs and allies in the family Pachygronthidae. There are more than 30 described species in Pachygrontha.

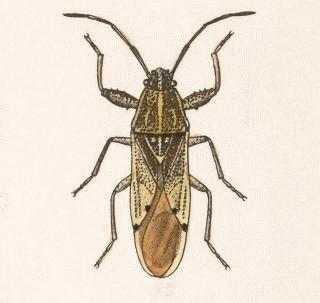
Pachygrontha oedancalodes

== Species ==
These 37 species belong to the genus Pachygrontha:

- Pachygrontha africana Slater, 1955
- Pachygrontha angularis Reuter, 1887
- Pachygrontha angusta Stal, 1870
- Pachygrontha antennata (Uhler, 1860)
- Pachygrontha austrina Kirkaldy, 1907
- Pachygrontha bakeri Slater, 1955
- Pachygrontha barberi Slater, 1955
- Pachygrontha bipunctata Stal, 1865
- Pachygrontha brazilensis Slater, 1966
- Pachygrontha carinata Slater, 1955
- Pachygrontha compacta Distant, 1893
- Pachygrontha congoensis Slater, 1955
- Pachygrontha flavolineata Zheng, Zou & Hsiao, 1979
- Pachygrontha grossa Slater, 1955
- Pachygrontha harrisi Slater, 1955
- Pachygrontha lestoni Slater, 1955
- Pachygrontha lewisi Distant, 1901
- Pachygrontha lineata Germar, 1837
- Pachygrontha longiceps Stal, 1874
- Pachygrontha longicornis (Stal, 1865)
- Pachygrontha lurida Slater, 1955
- Pachygrontha minarum Lethierry & Severin, 1894
- Pachygrontha mirabilis Slater, 1978
- Pachygrontha miriformis Breddin, 1905
- Pachygrontha nigrovittata Stal, 1870
- Pachygrontha oedancalodes Stal, 1874
- Pachygrontha paralineata Slater, 1955
- Pachygrontha pseudolineata Slater, 1955
- Pachygrontha quadripunctata (Signoret, 1860)
- Pachygrontha robusta Slater, 1955
- Pachygrontha semperi Stal, 1870
- Pachygrontha similis Uhler, 1896
- Pachygrontha singularis Slater, 1975
- Pachygrontha solieri (Montrousier, 1864)
- Pachygrontha variegata Slater, 1966
- Pachygrontha vidua Horvath, 1900
- Pachygrontha walkeri Distant, 1901
