= Opistostenus =

Scientific classification
- Kingdom: Animalia
- Phylum: Arthropoda
- Class: Insecta
- Order: Hemiptera
- Suborder: Heteroptera
- Family: Pachygronthidae
- Subfamily: Teracriinae
- Genus: Opistostenus; Reuter, 1882

Synonyms
- Opistholeptus Bergroth, 1894; Paraphlegyas Hesse, 1925; Phlegyas

Genus of true bugs

External image
- Images at iNaturalist

Opistostenus is a genus of Asian seed bugs in the family Pachygronthidae and subfamily Teracriinae, erected by Odo Reuter in 1882. The known species distribution appears to include western Indochina.

== Species ==
The Lygaeoidea Species File lists:

1. Opistostenus burmanus (Distant, 1904)
2. Opistostenus capeneri (Slater, 1955)
3. Opistostenus chinai (Slater, 1953)
4. Opistostenus elegans (Hesse, 1925)
5. Opistostenus horvathi (Slater, 1955)
6. Opistostenus indicus (Slater, 1966)
7. Opistostenus jordani (Slater, 1953)
8. Opistostenus ochreipennis Reuter, 1882 – type species (by original monotypy)
9. Opistostenus pallidus (Hesse, 1925)
10. Opistostenus parvus (Slater, 1953)
11. Opistostenus vulturnus (Kirkaldy, 1907)
