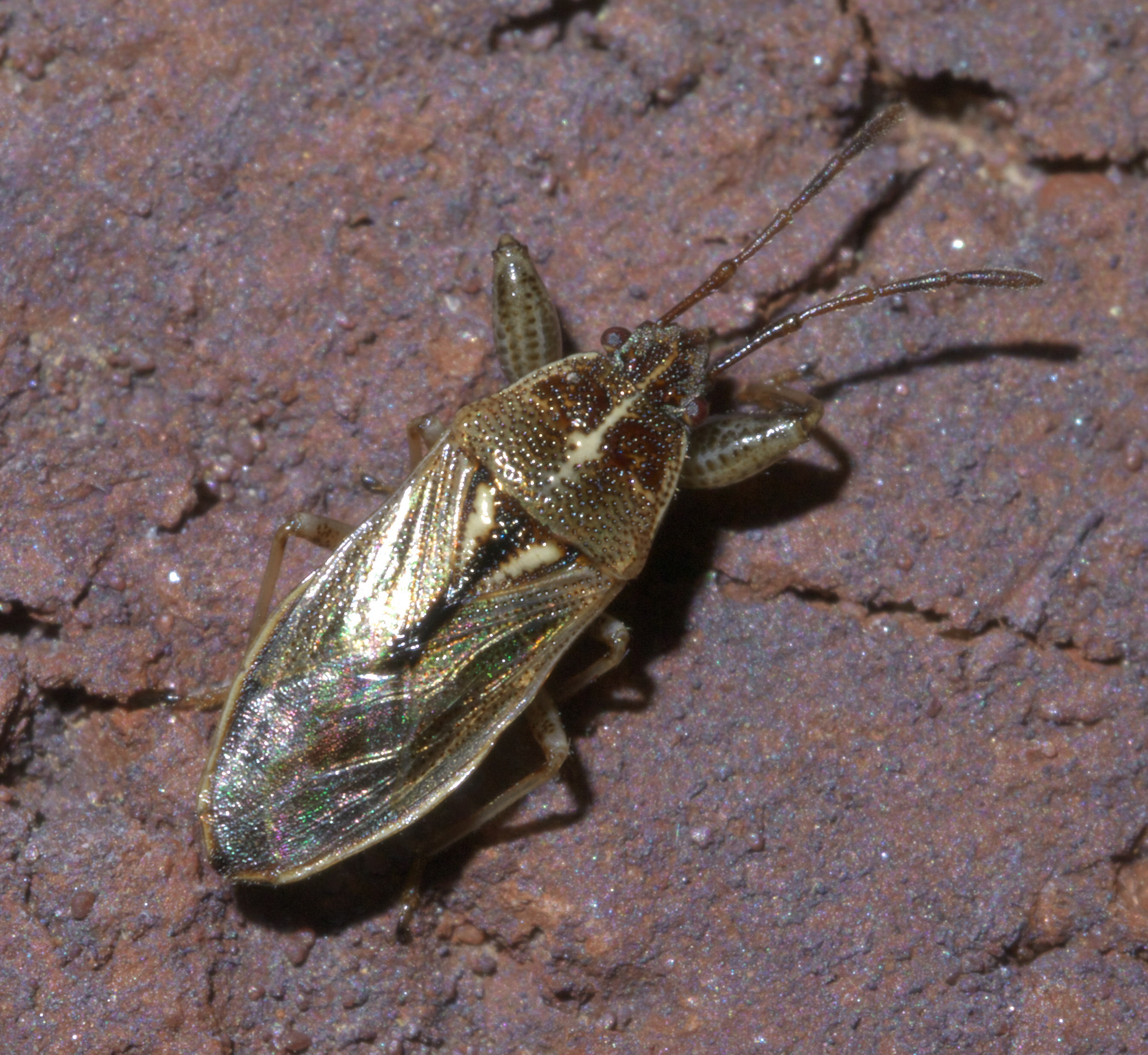
- Oedancala dorsalis

Scientific classification
- Kingdom: Animalia
- Phylum: Arthropoda
- Class: Insecta
- Order: Hemiptera
- Suborder: Heteroptera
- Infraorder: Pentatomomorpha
- Superfamily: Lygaeoidea
- Family: Pachygronthidae; Stål, 1865

= Pachygronthidae =

Family of true bugs

Pachygronthidae is a family of true bugs in the order Hemiptera. There are two subfamilies (both erected by Carl Stål) and more than 80 described species in Pachygronthidae.

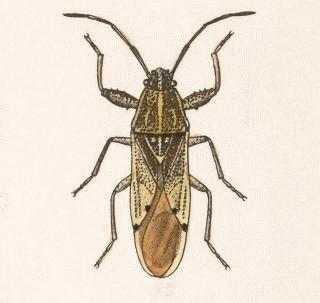
Pachygrontha oedancalodes

== Genera ==
The following genera are placed in two subfamilies:

=== Pachygronthinae ===
1. Magninus Distant, 1901
2. Oedancala Amyot & Serville, 1843
3. Pachygrontha Germar, 1837
4. Uttaris Stal, 1874

=== Teracriinae ===
1. Cymophyes Fieber, 1870
2. Darwinocoris Slater, 1962
3. Opistostenus Reuter, 1882
4. Pachyphlegyas Slater, 1955
5. Paristhmius Reuter, 1887
6. Phlegyas Stal, 1865
7. Stenophlegyas Slater, 1956
8. Stenophyella Horvath, 1914
9. Teracrius Stal, 1858

Incertae sedis

- † Procymophyes Sailer & Carvalho, 1957
