= Cuisine of the Central African Republic =

Culinary traditions of the Central African Republic

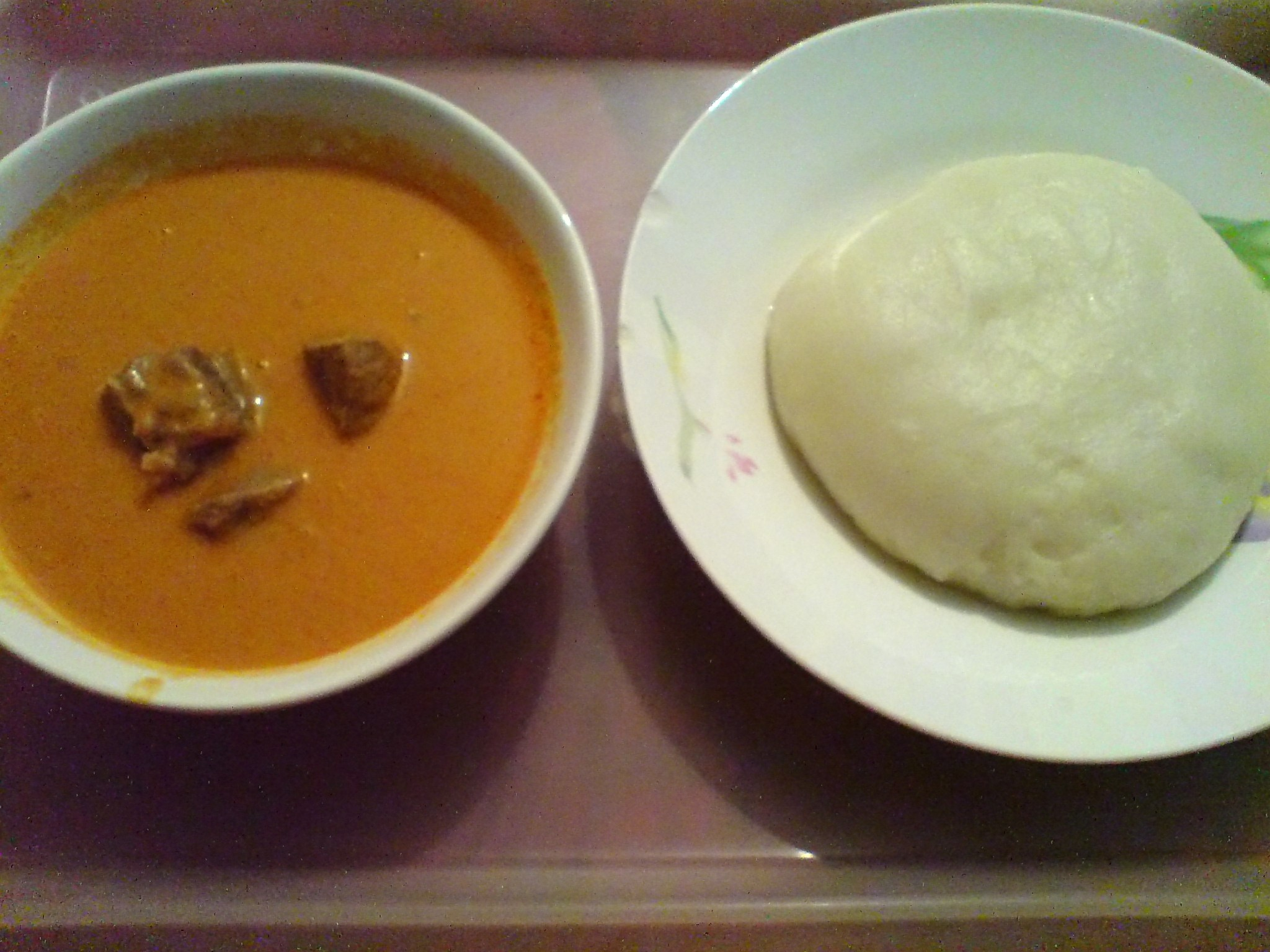
Fufu (pictured right) is a staple food of West and Central Africa. It is a thick paste made by boiling starchy root vegetables in water and pounding the mixture with a mortar and pestle. Peanut soup is pictured at left

Location of the Central African Republic

Central African cuisine includes the cuisines, cooking traditions, practices, ingredients and foods of the Central African Republic (CAR). Indigenous agriculture in the country includes millet, sorghum, banana, yam, okra, yellow onion, garlic, spinach, rice and palm oil. Imported crops of American origin include maize, manioc (cassava), peanuts, chili peppers, sweet potato and tomato. Additional foods include onions, garlic, chiles and peanuts.

Meat can be scarce in the Central African Republic, although fish is used in a variety of dishes, and other sources of protein include peanuts and insects such as cicadas, grasshoppers, crickets and termites. Common meats in Central African cuisine include chicken and goat. Wild game is also hunted, especially in rural areas and during the grass-burning dry season. Staple foods include starches, such as millet, rice, sesame and sorghum. A variety of vegetables and sauces are also consumed.

Roadside stalls sell foods such as baked goods and makara (a type of fried bread), sandwiches, barbecued meat and snacks. In the forests and in markets of Bangui where forest items are sold, caterpillars and the koko leaf are eaten. Restaurants are mostly for expatriates. Wild tubers, leaves, and mushrooms are used. Palm oil is widely used in various dishes.

The capital city of Bangui has western foods and hotel restaurants. The legal drinking age is 18. Muslims are prohibited from drinking alcohol. The PK5 area is known for its smaller restaurants serving reasonably priced traditional dishes.

== Common foods and dishes ==
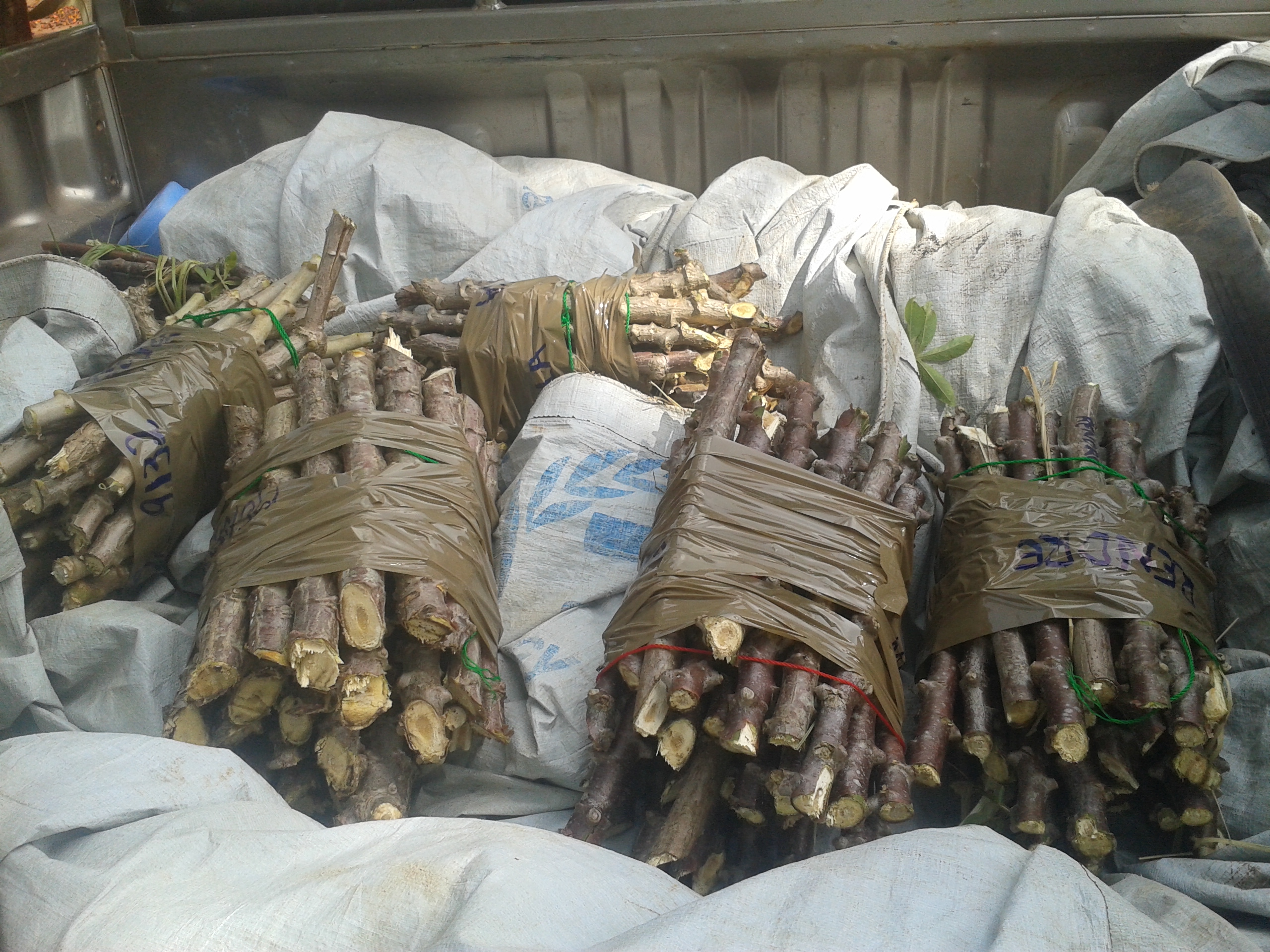
Cassava trimmings to be planted

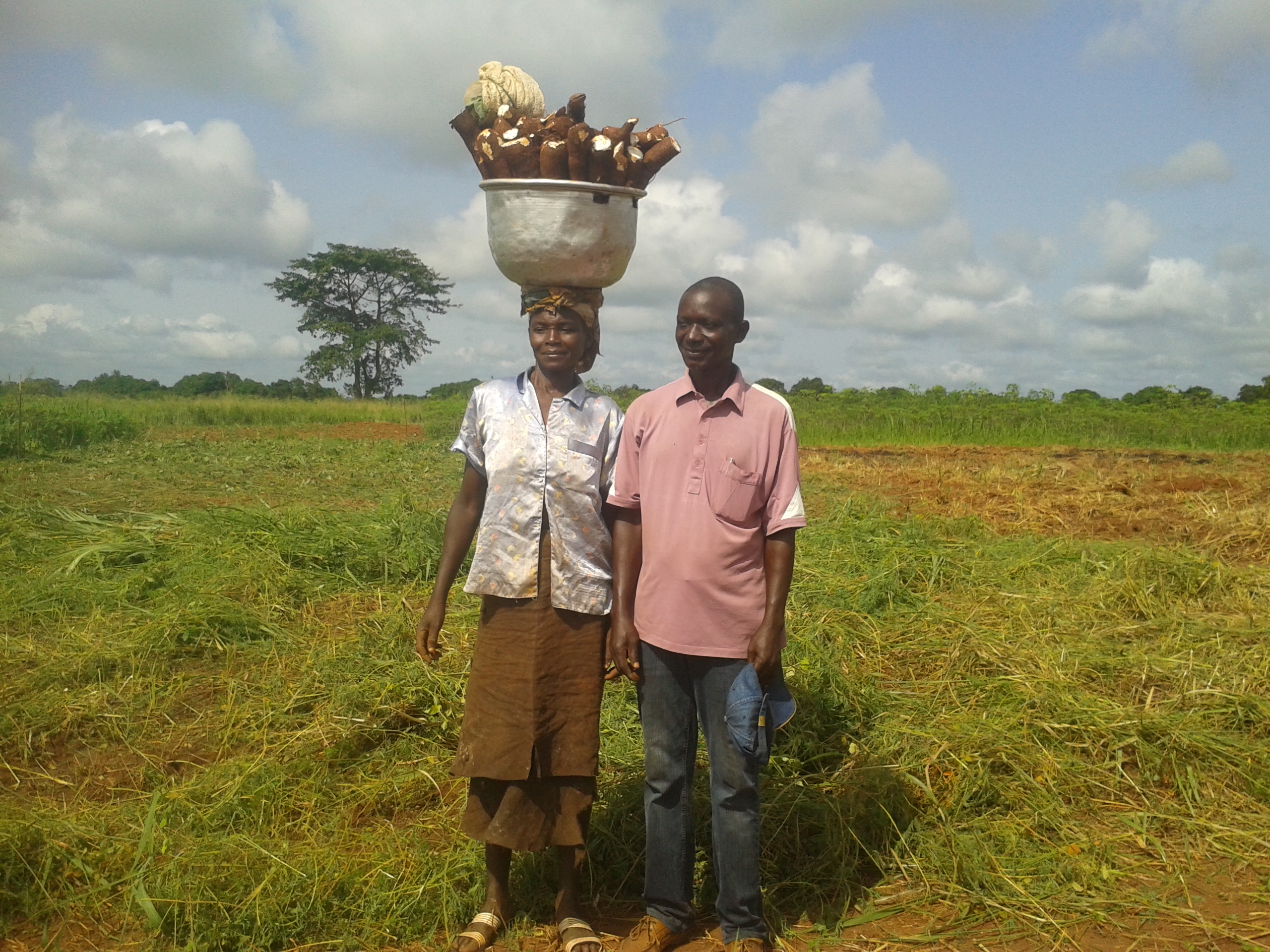
A woman harvesting and transporting cassava in Boukoko

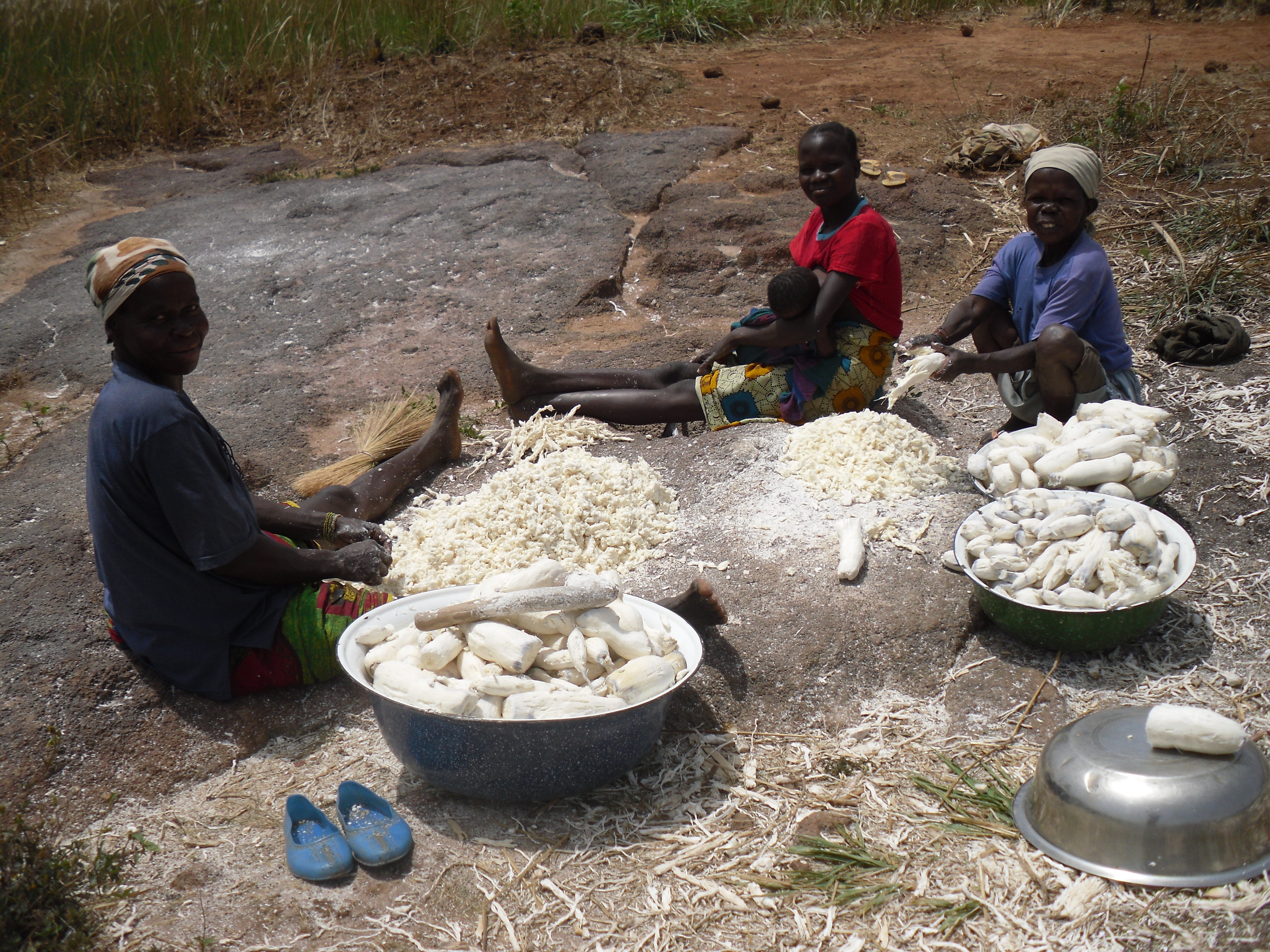
Women processing fresh cassava for cooking

- Bushmeat
- Cassava and cassava greens
- Chicken and cumin stew
- Chichinga, skewered barbecued goat
- Egusi sauce, common in many areas of Central Africa
- Fish, such as capitaine (Nile perch), fished at the river in Bangui
- Fruit, such as oranges, pineapple, plantain and banana
- Foutou, pounded plantains Both fufu and foutou are eaten like bread and often served with stews, soups and sauces Mashed yams are also sometimes used to prepare foutou.
- Fufu, pounded cassava
- Fulani boullie, a porridge with rice, peanut butter, millet flour and lemon
- Gozo, a paste prepared from cassava flour
- Kanda ti nyma, spicy meatballs made with beef
- Muamba de galinha, chicken with okra and palm oil
- Muamba, a stew made with minced palm nuts. Tomato, peanuts and chicken are often added
- Palm butter soup, prepared with palm butter
- Spinach, often cooked with groundnuts
- Spinach stew
- Shrimp with boiled sweet potato/boiled yam
- Yam, which is indigenous to the Central African Republic. In the mid-1800s, additional new yam varieties were introduced by Europeans.
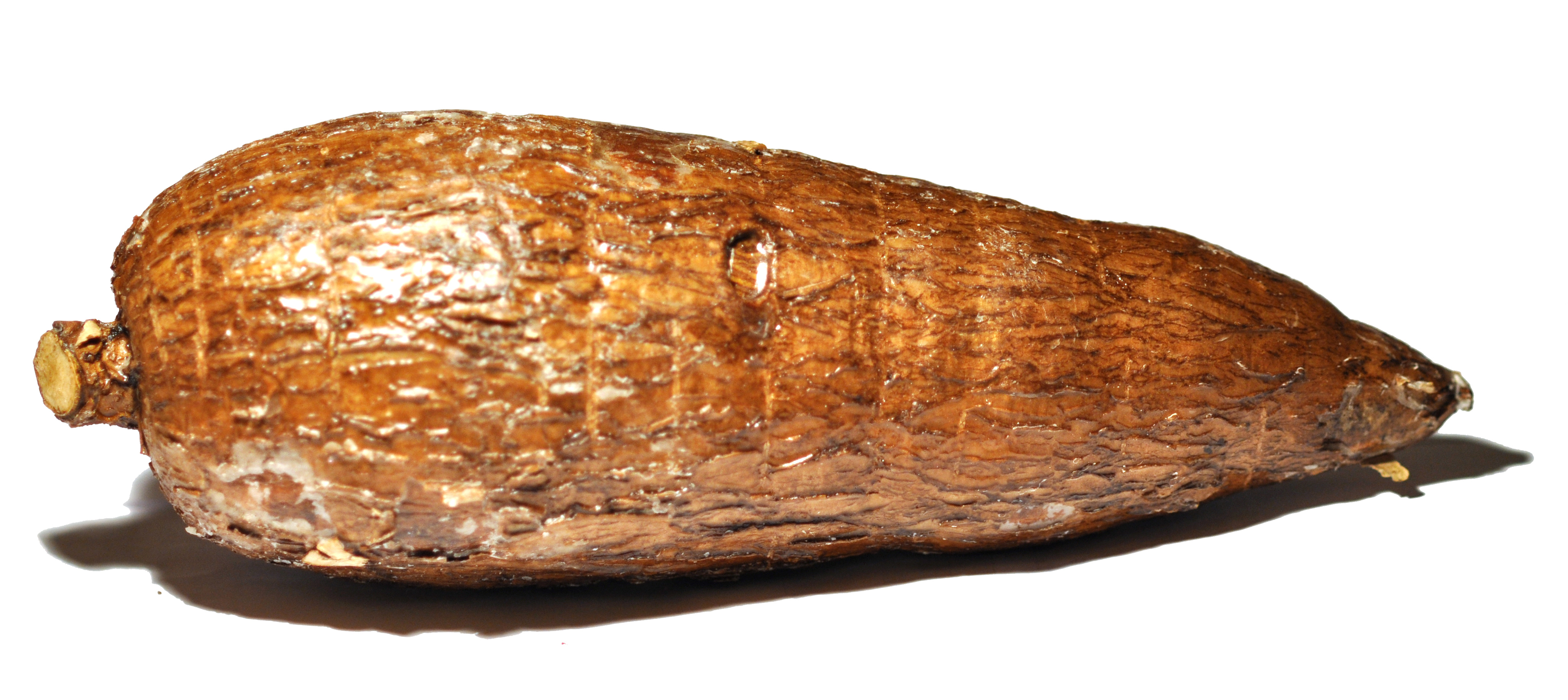
A manioc (cassava) tuber

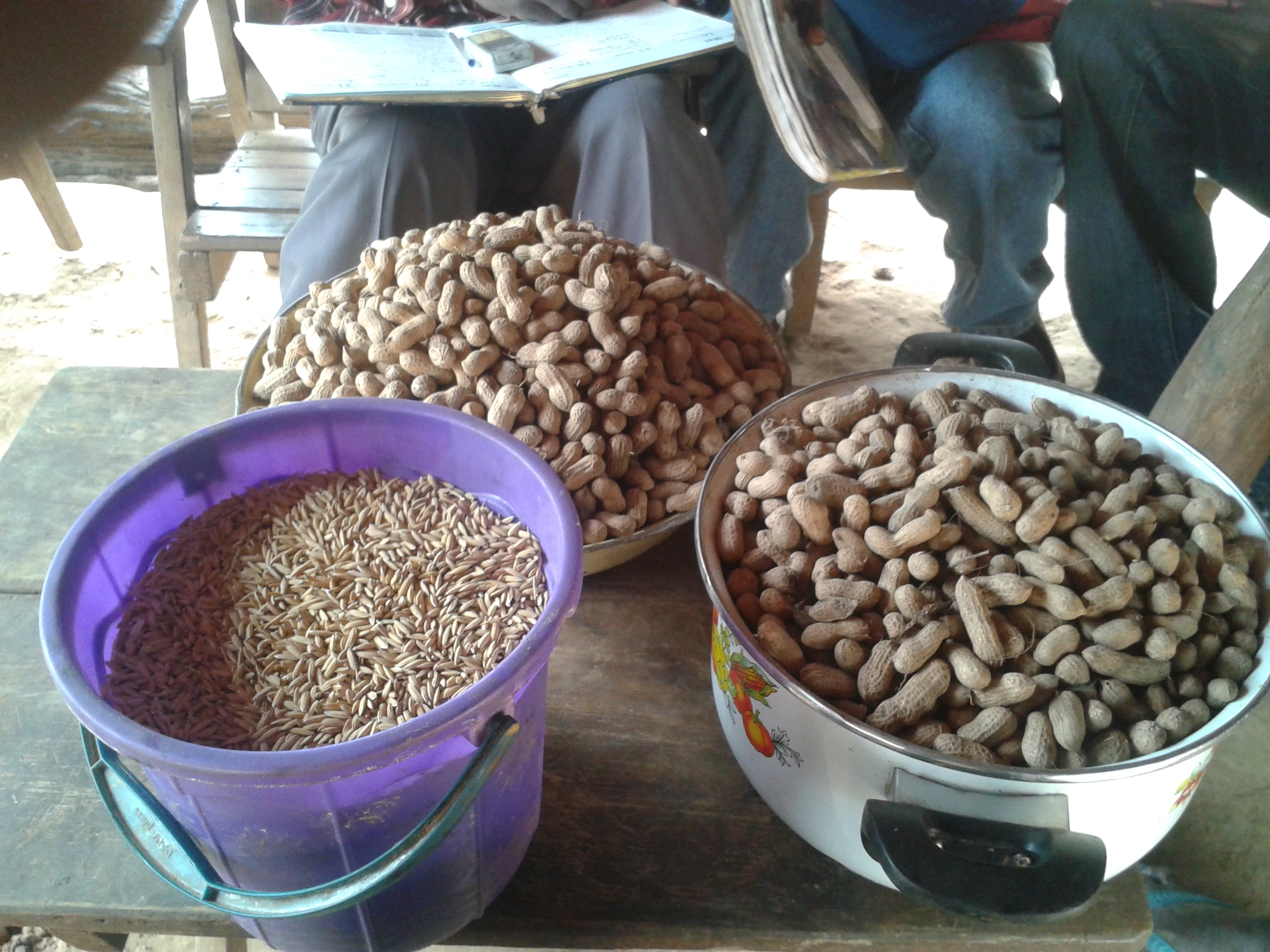
Groundnuts (peanuts) and rice harvested in the Central African Republic

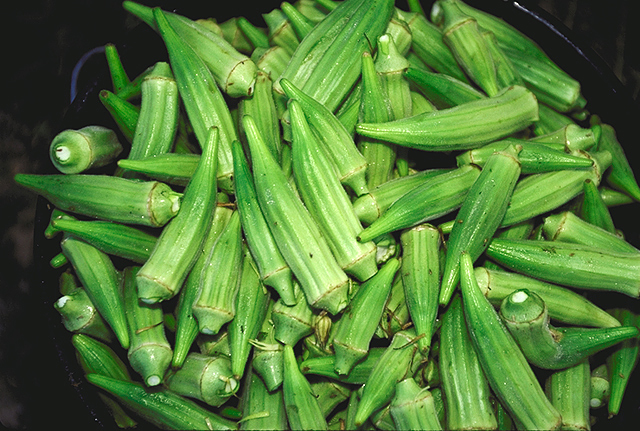
Okra is commonly eaten in the Central African Republic.

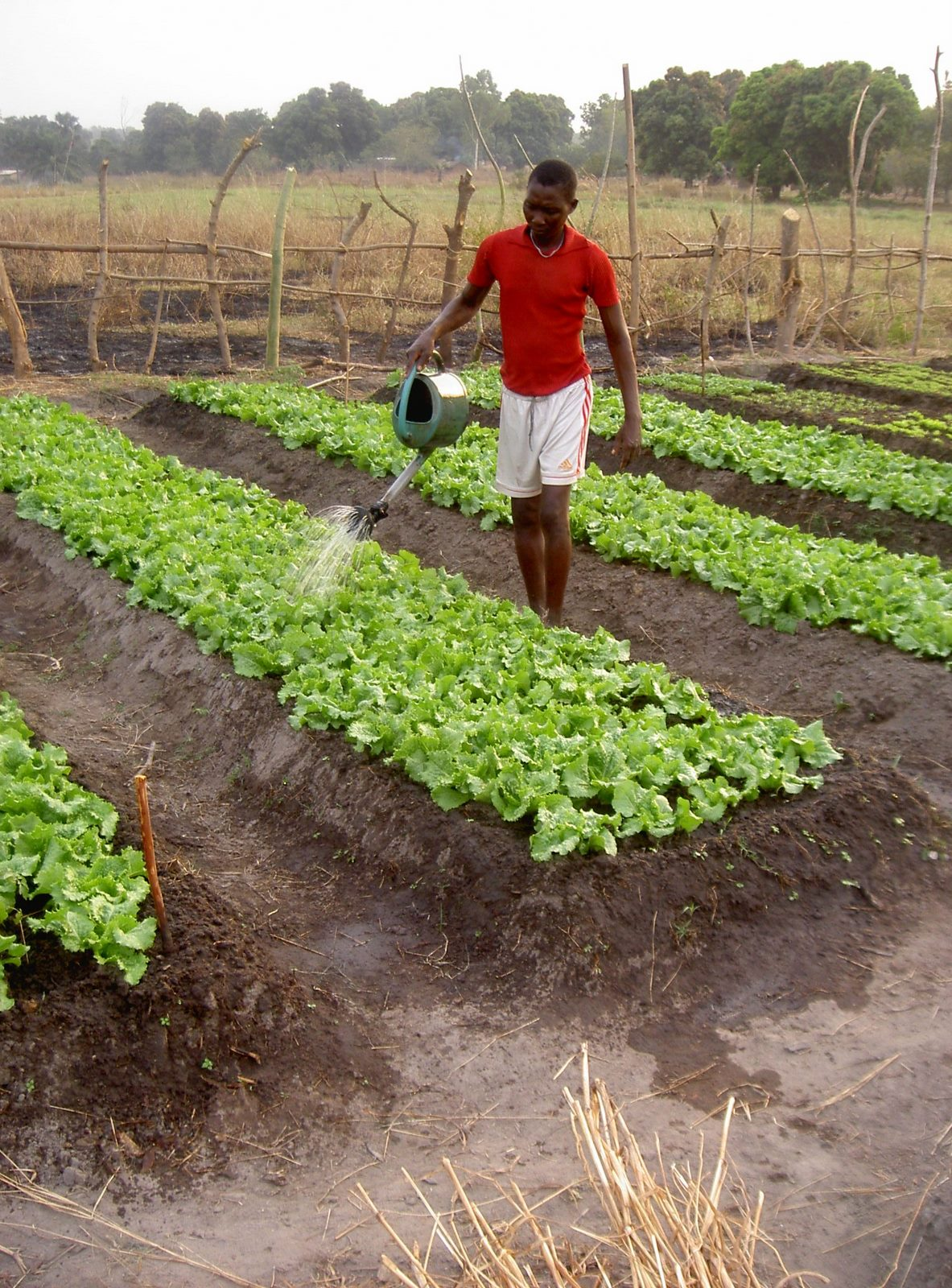
A Boston lettuce plantation in northern Central African Republic

== Beverages ==
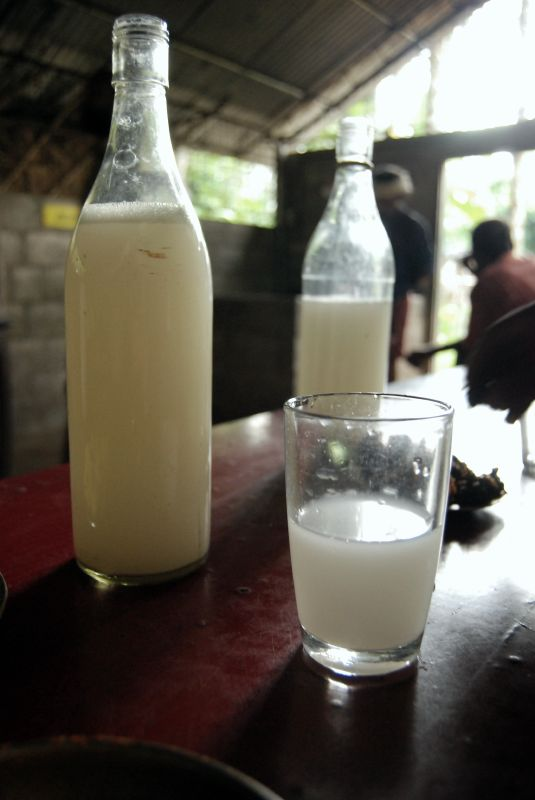
Palm wine

=== Non-alcoholic beverages ===
- Coffee
- Tea (tea and coffee are prepared with sugar and evaporated milk from cans)
- Ginger beer
- Karkanji is a hibiscus flower drink from the north.

=== Alcoholic beverages ===
- Palm wine
- Banana wine
- Soft drinks
- Traditional beer used sorghum
- Beer brands include Mocaf and Export
- Alcohol made from cassava or sorghum

== Cuisine in Bangui ==
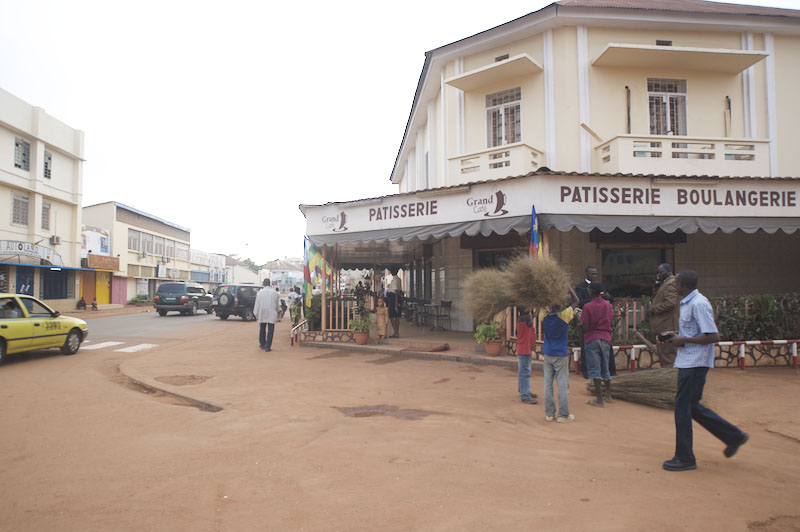
A French-style boulangerie in Bangui

Bangui is the capital of the Central African Republic, and the staple diet of the people there includes cassava, rice, squash, pumpkins and plantains (served with a sauce) and grilled meat. Okra or gombo is a popular vegetable. Peanuts and peanut butter are widely used. Game is popular, as are fish-based dishes such as maboké. Manioc flour is used for preparing fufu.

There are three types of restaurants in Bangui. Some focus on foreign cuisine, such as Relais des Chasses, La Tentation and L'Escale, which are oriented towards French food, and Ali Baba and Beyrouth, which serve Lebanese cuisine. There are a large number of African restaurants, such as the Madame M'boka, a favorite of the locals. A number of bars and street food stalls complement Bangui's culinary scene.

Alcoholic beverages served are locally brewed beer, palm wine and banana wine. Non-alcoholic beverages that are drunk include ginger beer. Village ecologique Boali en RCA in Boali is known for its local dishes.

== Food scarcity ==
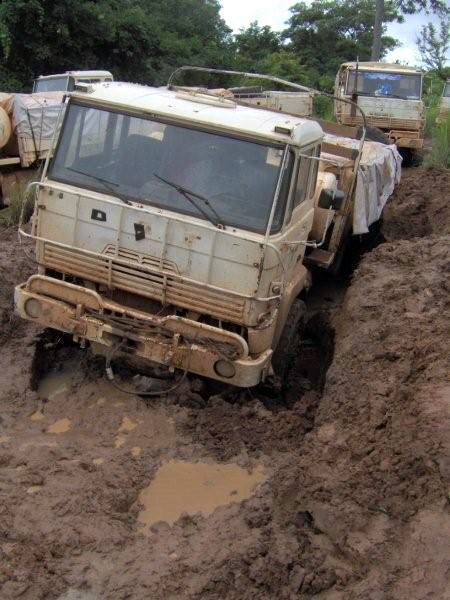
A food aid convoy in the Central African Republic in 2007

CAR's potential agricultural output can feed the entire population; however, four coups have occurred during the last decade which has significantly reduced agriculture and food production. These political and economic crises have caused significant food shortages due to the burning of agricultural fields, food storage areas and villages by armed groups.

== History ==
France once colonized what is now the country of Central African Republic as part French Equatorial Africa, and French influences are present in the nation's cuisine, including French bread and wine. During the 19th century Arab slave traders brought Middle Eastern influences. Earlier in its history it was then part of empires like Kanem-Bornu and Dafour based around Lake Chad, and its cuisine is similar to that of surrounding countries. Today the population is mostly Christian with Muslims in a majority in the north.

== See also ==
- African cuisine
- List of African cuisines
- List of African dishes
