= Fruit wine =

Fermented beverage made from fruit other than grapes

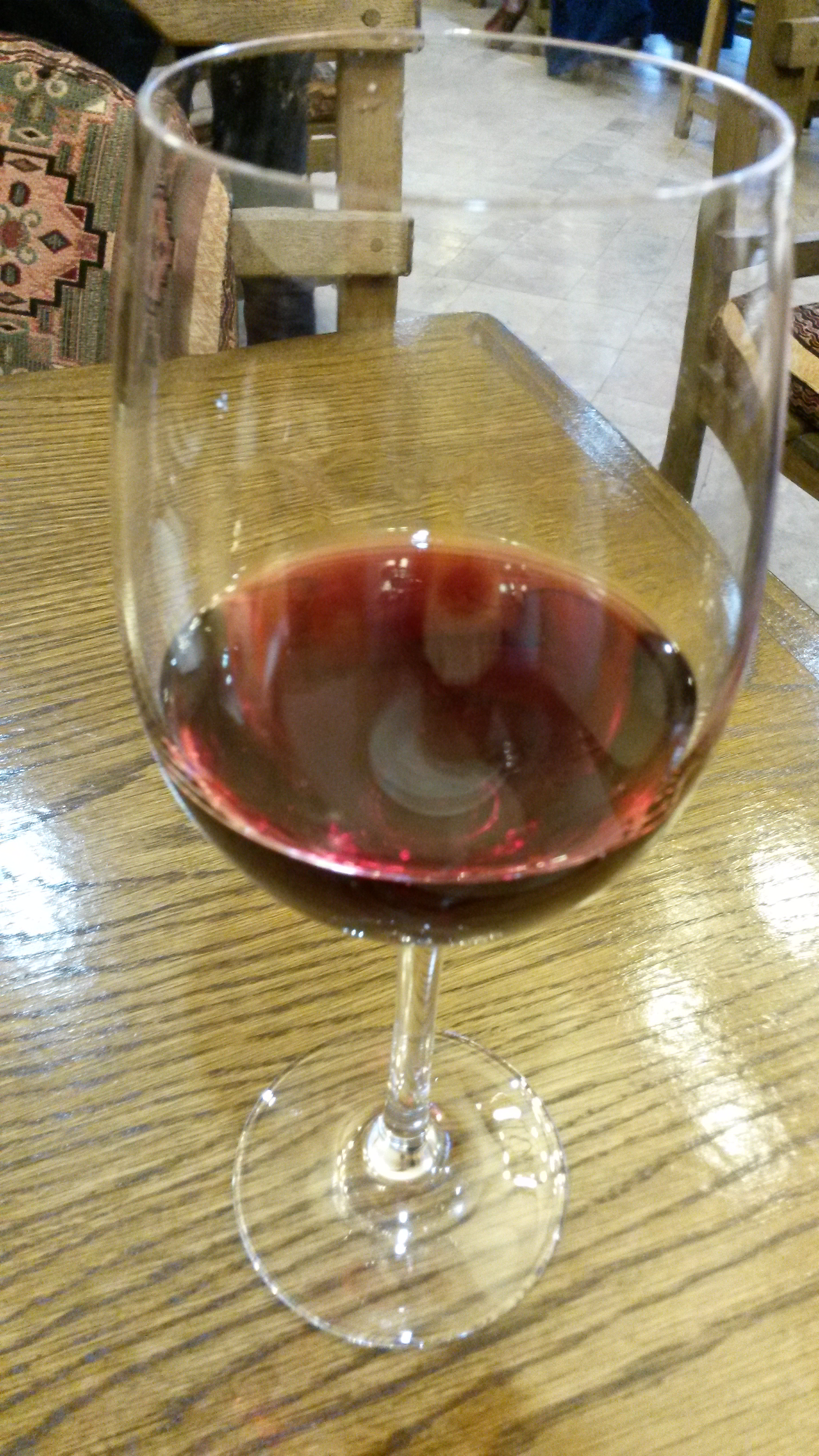
Pomegranate wine from Armenia

Fruit wines are fermented alcoholic beverages made from a variety of base ingredients (other than grapes); they may also have additional flavors taken from fruits, flowers, and herbs. This definition is sometimes broadened to include any alcoholic fermented beverage except beer. For historical reasons, cider and perry are also excluded from the definition of fruit wine.

Fruit wines have traditionally been popular with home winemakers and in areas with cool climates such as North America and Scandinavia. In subtropical climates, such as in East Africa, India, and the Philippines, wine is made from bananas.

== Labeling ==
Fruit wines are usually referred to by their main ingredient (e.g., plum wine or elderberry wine) because the usual definition of wine states that it is made from fermented grape juice.

In the European Union, wine is legally defined as the fermented juice of grapes.

In the United Kingdom, fruit wine is commonly called country wine; the term should not be conflated with the French term vin de pays, which is grape wine. In British legislation, the term made wine is used.

== Production ==
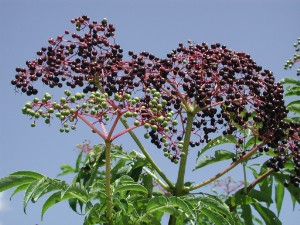
Elderberries, a common fruit wine ingredient.

Fruit wine can be made from virtually any plant matter that can be fermented. Most fruits and berries have the potential to produce wine. There are a number of methods of extracting flavour and juice from the fruits or plants being used; pressing the juice, stewing and fermenting the pulp of the fruits are common. Few foods other than grapes have the balanced quantities of sugar, acid, tannin, nutritive salts for yeast feeding, and water to naturally produce a stable, drinkable wine, so most country wines are adjusted in one or more respects at fermentation. However, some of these products do require the addition of sugar or honey to make them palatable and to increase the alcoholic content (sugar is converted to alcohol in the fermentation). Two commonly produced varieties are elderberry wine and dandelion wine. A wine made from elderberry flowers is called elder blow wine.

The amount of fermentable sugars is often low and needs to be supplemented by a process called chaptalization in order to have sufficient alcohol levels in the finished wine. Sucrose is often added so that there is sufficient sugar to ferment to completion while keeping the level of acidity acceptable. If the specific gravity of the initial solution is too high, indicating an excess of sugar, water or acidulated water may be added to adjust the specific gravity down to the winemaker's target range.

Many kinds of fruit have a natural acid content which would be too high to produce a savory and pleasant fruit wine in undiluted form; this can be particularly true, among others, for strawberries, cherries, pineapples, and raspberries. Therefore, much as to regulate sugar content, the fruit mash is generally topped up with water prior to fermentation to reduce the acidity to pleasant levels. This also dilutes and reduces overall fruit flavor; a loss of flavor can be compensated for by adding sugar again after fermentation which then acts as a flavor enhancer (known as a back-sweetener), while too much acid in the finished wine will always give it undesired harshness and pungency.

Many fruit wines suffer from a lack of natural yeast nutrients needed to promote or maintain fermentation. Winemakers can counter this with the addition of nitrogen, phosphorus and potassium available commercially as yeast nutrient. In the opinion of one wine writer fruit wines often do not improve with bottle age and are usually meant to be consumed within a year of bottling.

== Specific types ==
=== Cherry wine ===
Cherry wine is a type of fruit wine made with cherries, usually tart cherries that provide sufficient acid. Cherry wines can be used to make fortified wines and liqueurs. Michigan wine makers, located in the leading tart-cherry-producing region of the United States, produce several varieties of cherry wine, including spiced versions and cherry-grape blends. "Cherry Kijafa" is a fortified fruit wine that is produced in Denmark from cherries with added natural flavors, and usually contains 16% alcohol by volume. Among cherry liqueurs Maraska, a cherry wine made from Marasca cherry from Croatia, is among the best known. The last couple of years Fredriksdal Cherry Wine (partly invented by distinguished restaurant owner Jan Friis-Mikkelsen) has been produced in Denmark. Cherry wine production is becoming popular in China, where cherry production is high.

=== Dandelion wine ===
Dandelion wine is a fruit wine of moderate alcohol content that is made from dandelion petals and sugar, usually combined with an acid (such as lemon juice).

While commonly made as a homemade recipe, there are a handful of wineries that commercially produce dandelion wine, including Bellview Winery of New Jersey, Breitenbach Winery of Ohio, Hidden Legend Winery of Montana and Maple River Winery of North Dakota.

=== Orange wine ===
Fruit wine can be made from oranges. This should not be confused with orange wine, also known as amber wine, which is made from grapes, but is orange/amber in color. Wine made from oranges, although not commercially widely available, is produced in White River, South Africa, and by home wine makers. The taste is a light bodied wine, pale or golden in color, dry, thin in body, alcoholic. Outcome is reliant on the yeast used. Recipes are few and far between. Typically a home wine maker is receiving the bounty of their own orange tree or from a neighbors tree. The wine can be difficult to make because the fruit is very acidic, and the pH must be adjusted up. Further complications are encountered by a type of Penicillium mold that can stop the fermentation and spoil the wine. Great care must be taken to clean and sanitize the fruit. The remainder of the process is straightforward. The US government Alcohol and Tobacco Tax and Trade Bureau has a standard for orange wine.

=== Pineapple wine ===
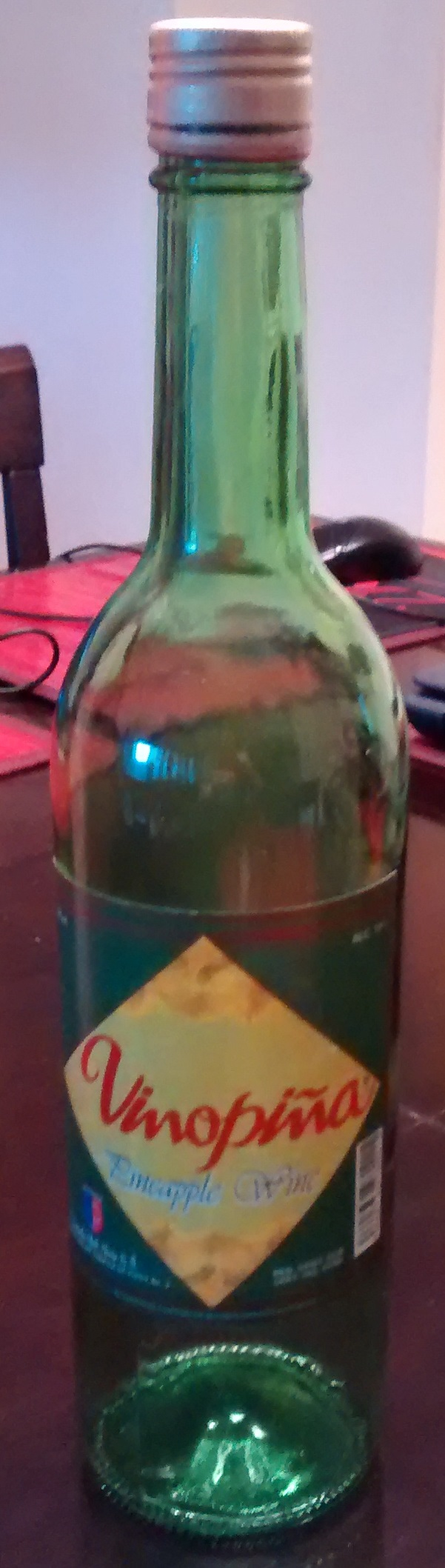
Bottle of pineapple wine from Dominican Republic

Pineapple wine is made from the juice of pineapples. Fermentation of the pineapple juice takes place in temperature-controlled vats and is stopped at near-dryness. The result is a soft, dry, fruit wine with a strong pineapple bouquet. Pineapple wine is popular in Thailand and other south-East asian countries, where it is made using traditional practices and is not available commercially. In Mexico, fermented pineapple beverages are very popular and given the name tepache.

Commercial examples from around the world include Maui's Winery in Hawaii and Jacobs Wines of Nigeria, the first pineapple winery in Africa. It is also made in Dominican Republic by Vinicola Del Norte, its alcohol content is 10%. Several varieties of pineapple wine are made in Okinawa, Japan, from local produce. Its alcohol content is 11.5% ABV.

=== Plum wine ===
Plum jerkum is made from fermented plums in a manner similar to the use of apples for cider. It was often associated with the north Cotswolds and was once a product of the city of Worcester.

Umeshu (梅酒), sometimes known as "plum wine", is a beverage popular in both Japan and Korea, made by steeping ume, or Japanese plums, in shōchū or another clear liquor such as sake. It is not a true fruit wine, as the plums are not fermented. It is commonly drunk mixed with soda or in a cocktail.

=== Pomegranate wine ===
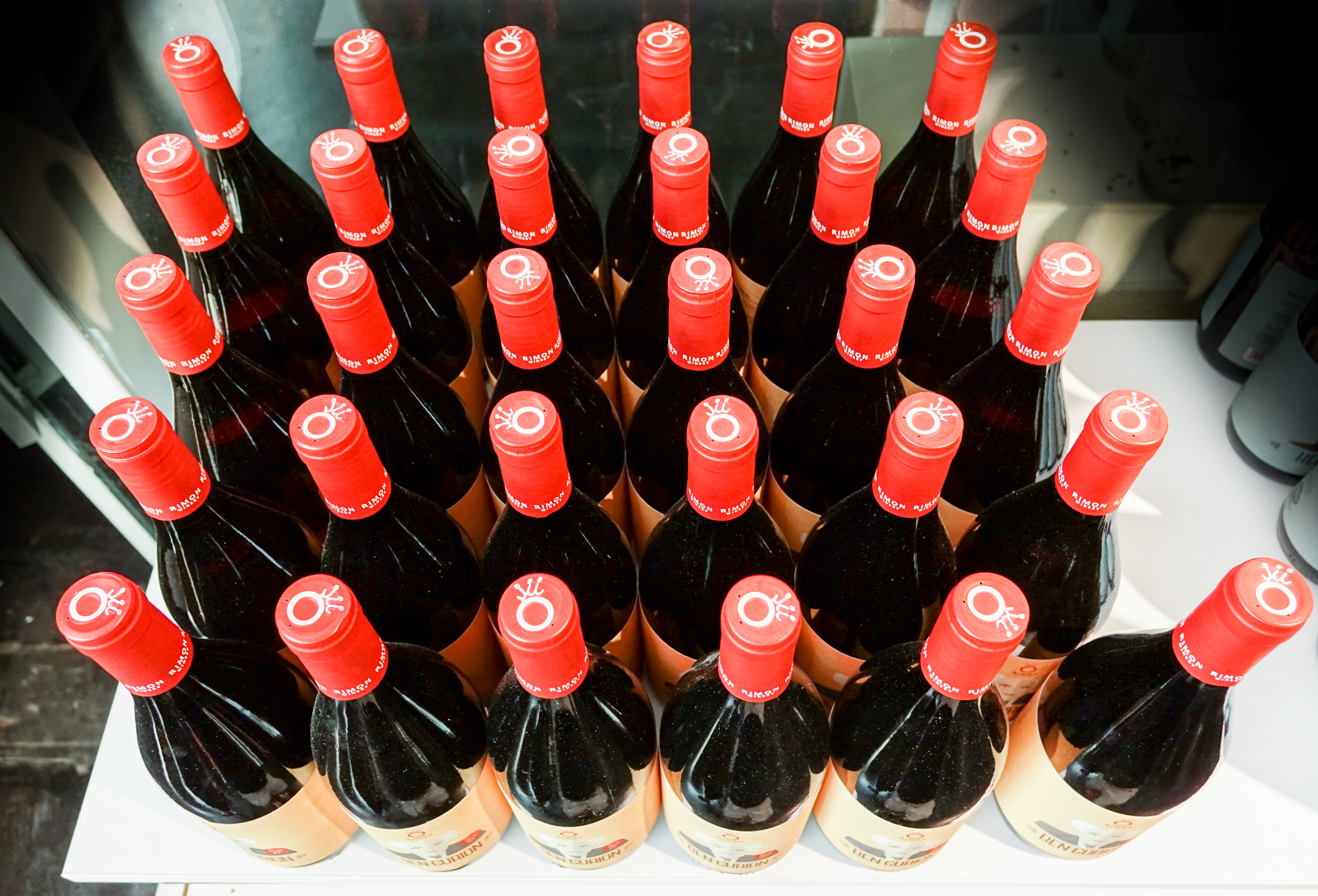
Pomegranate wine in Israel

Pomegranate wine (Armenian: նռան գինի) production has its roots in Armenia and dates back centuries, with evidence of its use in winemaking found in ancient Armenian artifacts.

Pomegranate wine is a type of fruit wine. A commercial pomegranate wine product was developed in Israel, and is marketed abroad as Rimon. Since then, commercial pomegranate wine has also started also to be made in Cyprus, Turkey, Armenia, Georgia, and Azerbaijan.

=== Redcurrant and whitecurrant wines ===
Redcurrant and whitecurrant fruit wines are beverages that are usually produced in northerly cool areas, where it is hard to grow high-quality grapes. They are simple to produce. Their natural chemical balances are such that they can be self-clarified without any additional substances. Redcurrants and whitecurrants contain only a small amount of carbohydrates; this necessitates the addition of sugar or honey.

=== Rose hip wine ===
Rose hip wine is a fruit wine. It can be made from fresh or dried rose hips. To produce this beverage, the rose hips are fermented in syrup with yeast and citric acid, creating an extract. This technique is used with only a few other types of fruit wine, including blackthorn (sloe), hawthorn, and rowan.

=== Date wine ===
Date wine was made by the ancient Egyptians.

== Other fruit wines ==
- Banana wine
- Lychee wine
- Elderberry wine
- Fruit wine can also be made from blackberry, blackcurrant, blueberry, cranberry, gooseberry, mulberry, raspberry, seaberry, or strawberry.

== Fruit dessert wines ==
There is also the option of producing fruit dessert wines. Many homemade country wines and fruit wines are made in a dessert wine style with more or less residual sugar and high alcohol content. Dessert wines do not have to be sweet, such as the sherry fino. In Germany, fruit dessert wines are fruit wines with more than 12.0% vol. In Austria they need an alcohol content of at least 13.0% vol. to a maximum of 22.0% vol. The total alcohol content may be increased by adding alcohol, fruit spirits, sugar, fruit juice and fruit juice concentrate to the fruit wine or cider. Fruit dessert wines can thus resemble classic dessert wines such as sherry or port wine. In US these wines are often labelled as fruit port and resemble fruit liqueur. It is also possible to produce fruit vermouth or other fruit wines flavored with herbs and spices.

There are different production methods for fruit dessert wines. In Canada you can find apple icewine, which is produced by cryo-extraction (freeze concentration) of apple juice or apple cider (ice cider). Oxidative vinification (sherrisation) is used, for example, in apple dessert wine. Adding alcohol (port wine method, fortification) can be found with French pommeau or with cherry wine and other fruit dessert wines, for example, from Denmark. For fortified wines that are legally between wine and spirits, a tax is usually paid in accordance with the country-specific regulation.

== See also ==
- Cider (alcohol made from apples)
- Fruit brandy (distilled alcohol made from fruit)
- Perry (alcohol made from pears)
- Pruno (aka prison wine)
