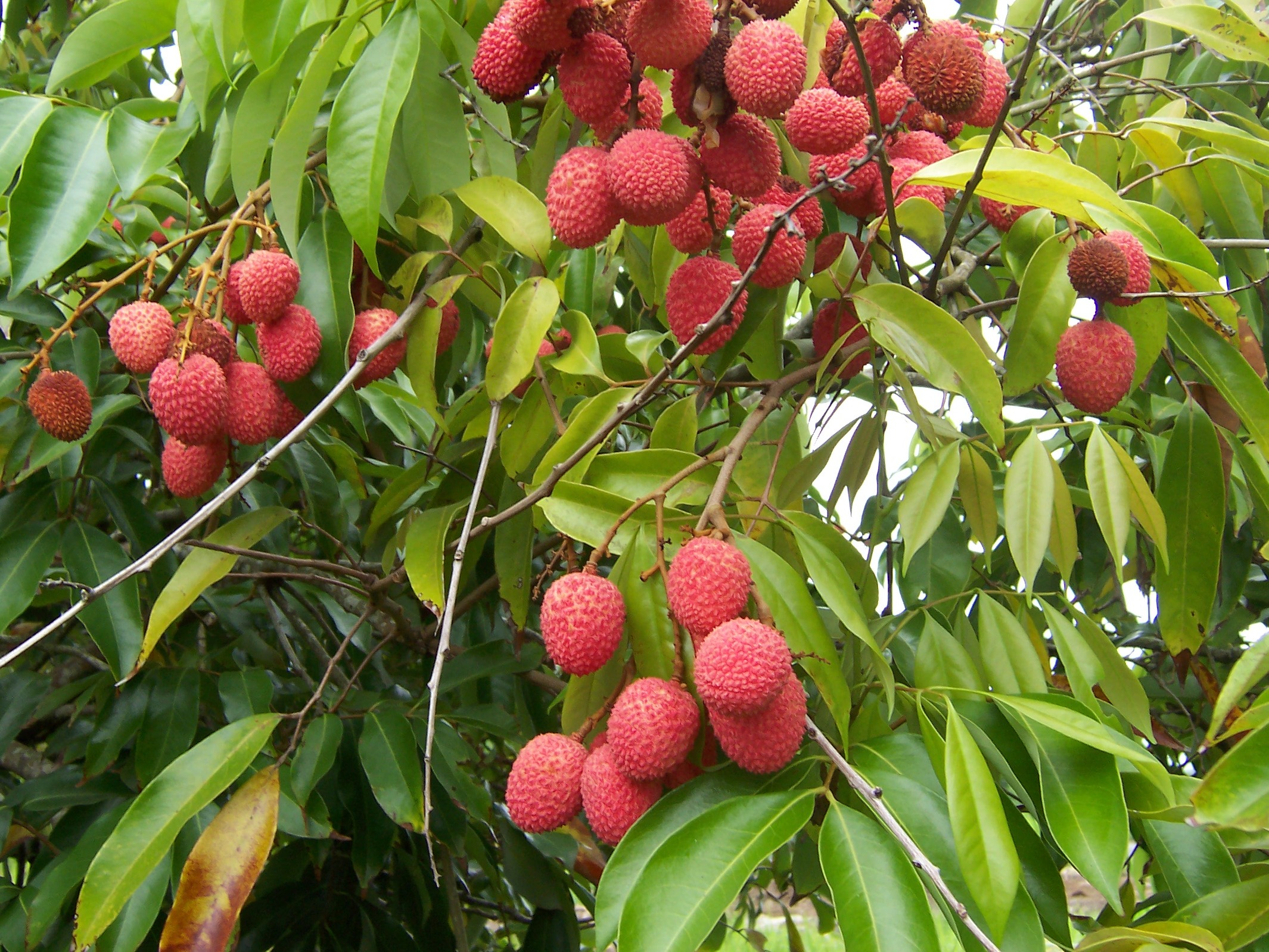

Conservation status
- Vulnerable (IUCN 2.3)

Scientific classification
- Kingdom: Plantae
- Clade: Tracheophytes
- Clade: Angiosperms
- Clade: Eudicots
- Clade: Rosids
- Order: Sapindales
- Family: Sapindaceae
- Tribe: Nephelieae
- Genus: Litchi; Sonn.
- Species: L. chinensis

Binomial name
- Litchi chinensis Sonn.

Synonyms
- Corvinia litschi Stadtm. ex P.Willemet; Euphoria didyma Blanco; Euphoria punicea Lam.; Litchi sinensis J.F.Gmel.; Nephelium chinense (Sonn.) Druce; Nephelium didymum Craib; Scytalia chinensis Gaertn.; Scytalia squamosa Stokes

= Lychee =

Species of fruit tree

Lychee
- Chinese: 荔枝
Transcriptions
Standard Mandarin
- Hanyu Pinyin: Lìzhī
- Gwoyeu Romatzyh: Lihjy
- Wade–Giles: Li^{4}-chih^{1}
- IPA: [lî.ʈʂɻ̩́]
Yue: Cantonese
- Yale Romanization: Laihjī
- Jyutping: Lai^{6}-zi^{1}
- IPA: [lɐj˨.tsi˥]
Southern Min
- Hokkien POJ: Nāi/Lāi-chi
- Tâi-lô: Nāi/Lāi-tsi

Lychees (Note: Also spelled litchi, lichee, or lichi.) (/ˈlaɪtʃiː/ LIE-chee, US also /ˈliːtʃiː/ LEE-chee) are the fruit of the tree Litchi chinensis, the sole member of the genus Litchi, part of the soapberry family, Sapindaceae. They are edible, with a sweet, mildly tart flavor, and have a distinctive floral aroma often described as rose-like.

There are three distinct subspecies of lychee. The most common is the Indochinese lychee, found in South China, Malaysia, and northern Vietnam. The other two are the Philippine lychee (locally called alupag or matamata), found only in the Philippines, and the Javanese lychee, cultivated in Indonesia and Malaysia. The tree has been introduced throughout Southeast and South Asia. Cultivation in China has been documented since the 11th century. China is the main producer of lychees, followed by India, Vietnam, other countries in Southeast Asia, other countries in South Asia, Madagascar, and South Africa. A tall evergreen tree, it bears small fleshy sweet fruits. The outside of the fruit is a pink-red, rough-textured soft shell.

Lychee seeds contain methylene cyclopropyl glycine, which has caused hypoglycemia associated with outbreaks of encephalopathy in undernourished Indian and Vietnamese children who consumed lychee fruit.

== Taxonomy ==
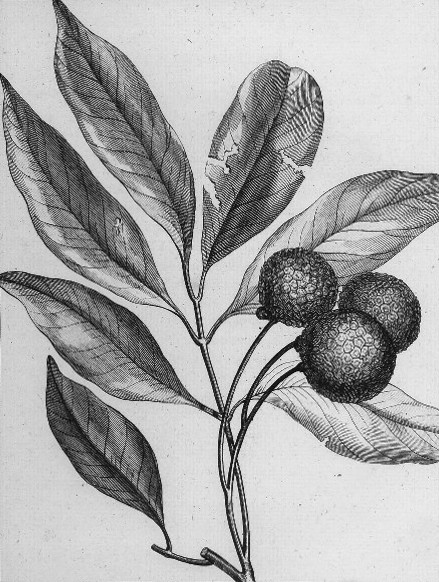
Pierre Sonnerat's drawing from Voyage aux Indes Orientales et à la Chine (1782)

Litchi chinensis is the sole member of the genus Litchi in the soapberry family, Sapindaceae.

It was described and named by French naturalist Pierre Sonnerat in his account Voyage aux Indes Orientales et à la Chine, fait depuis 1774 jusqu'à 1781 (translation: Voyage to the East Indies and China, made from 1774 to 1781), which was published in 1782. There are three subspecies, determined by flower arrangement, twig thickness, fruit, and the number of stamens.

- Litchi chinensis subsp. chinensis is the only commercialized lychee. It grows wild in southern China, northern Vietnam, and Cambodia. It has thin twigs; the flowers typically have six stamens; and the fruits are smooth or have protuberances up to 2 mm (0.079 in).
- Litchi chinensis subsp. philippinensis (Radlk.) Leenh is common in the wild in the Philippines and rarely cultivated. Locally called alupag, mata-mata, or matamata due to its eye-like appearance when the fruit is opened, it has thin twigs, six to seven stamens, and long, oval fruit with spiky protuberances up to 3 mm (0.12 in).
- Litchi chinensis subsp. javensis is only known to be cultivated in Malaysia and Indonesia. It has thick twigs, flowers with seven to eleven stamens in sessile clusters, and smooth fruit with protuberances up to 1 mm (0.039 in).

== Description ==
=== Tree ===
Litchi chinensis is an evergreen tree that is frequently less than 15 m (49 ft) tall, sometimes reaching 28 m (92 ft). Its leaves, 12.5 to 20 cm (4.9 to 7.9 in) long, are pinnate, having 4 to 8 alternate, elliptic-oblong to lanceolate, abruptly pointed leaflets,

The bark is grey-black and the branches a brownish-red. The leaves are 12.5 to 20 cm (4.9 to 7.9 in) long, with leaflets in two to four pairs. Lychees are similar in foliage to those of the family Lauraceae, likely due to convergent evolution. They adapted by developing water-repellent leaves which are called laurophyll or lauroid leaves.

Flowers grow on a terminal inflorescence with many panicles on the current season's growth. The panicles grow in clusters of 10 or more, reaching 10 to 40 cm (3.9 to 15.7 in) or longer, holding hundreds of small white, yellow, or green flowers that are distinctively fragrant.

=== Fruit ===
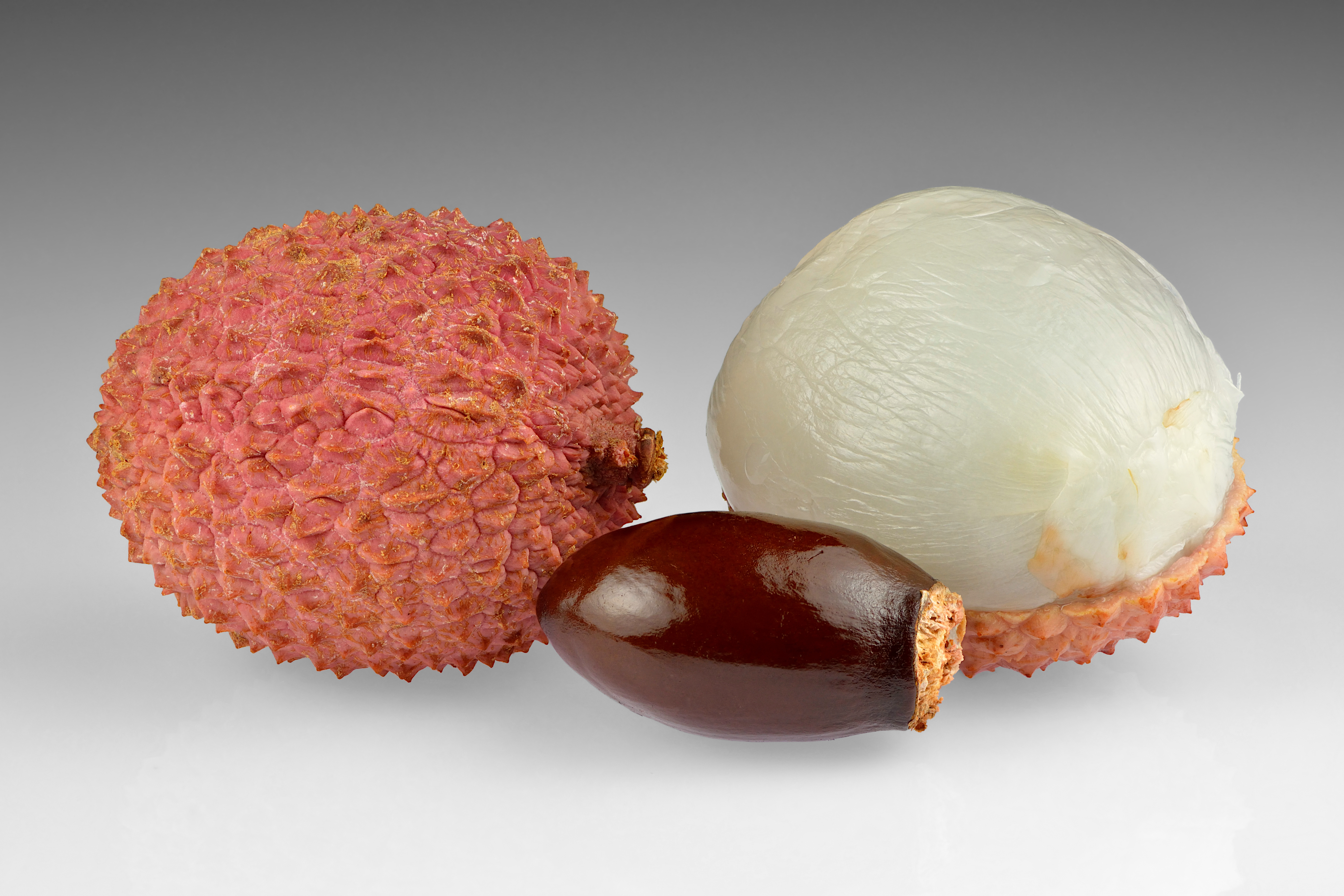
Whole and opened fruit with seed

The lychee tree bears fleshy fruits that mature in 80 to 112 days depending on climate, location, and cultivar. Fruits vary in shape from round to ovoid to heart-shaped, up to 5 cm long and 4 cm wide (2.0 in × 1.6 in), weighing approximately 20 g.

The thin, tough skin is green when immature, ripening to red or pink-red, and is smooth or covered with small, sharp, roughly-textured protuberances. The rind is inedible but easily removed to expose a layer of translucent white flesh with a floral aroma and a sweet flavor. The skin turns brown and dry when left out after harvesting.

The fleshy, edible portion of the fruit is an aril, surrounding one dark brown inedible seed that is 1 to 3.3 cm long and 0.6 to 1.2 cm wide (0.39–1.30 by 0.24–0.47 in). Some cultivars produce a high percentage of fruits with shriveled aborted seeds known as 'chicken tongues'. These fruits typically have a higher price, due to having more edible flesh. Since the floral flavor is lost in the process of canning, the fruit is usually eaten fresh.

=== Flavor and aroma ===
The edible aril of the lychee is juicy and translucent, with a sweet, mildly tart flavor and a distinctive floral aroma often described as rose-like. Its sweetness is primarily due to sucrose, glucose, and fructose, while malic and citric acids provide acidity. Aroma-active compounds in the flesh include the monoterpenes linalool, geraniol, nerol, limonene, and cis-rose oxide, which contribute rose-like and citrus-like notes, as well as furaneol (sweet, caramel-like), methional (cooked-potato nuance), and sulfur volatiles such as dimethyl trisulfide.

== History ==
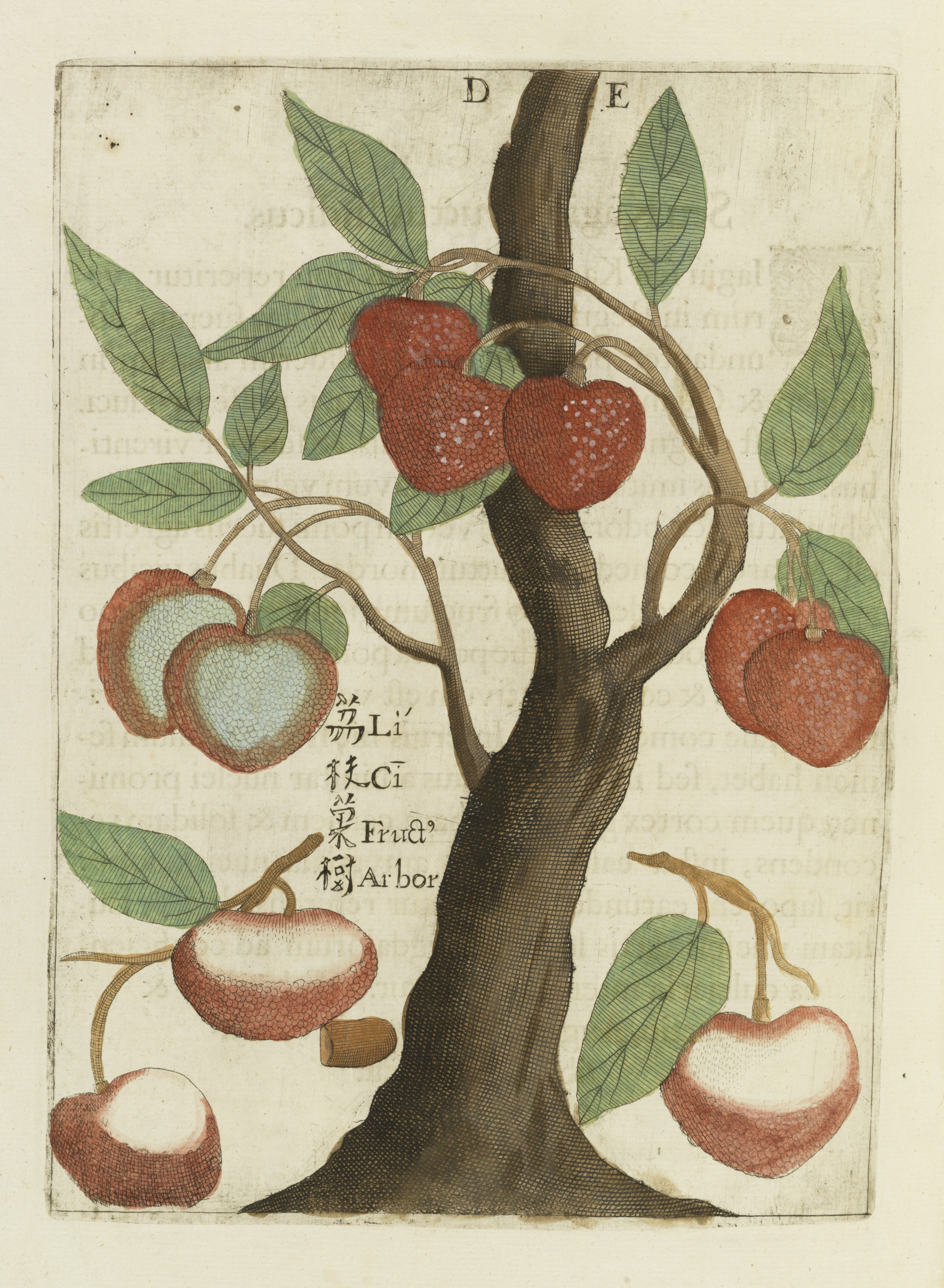
"Lici Fruit Tree" in Michał Boym's Flora Sinensis (1657)

Cultivation of lychees began in the regions of southern China (going back to 1059 AD), Malaysia, and northern Vietnam. Unofficial records in China refer to lychees as far back as 2000 BC. Wild trees still grow in parts of southern China and on Hainan Island. The fruit was a delicacy in the Chinese Imperial Court.

In the 1st century during the Han dynasty, fresh lychees were a popular tribute item, and in such demand at the Imperial Court that a special courier service with fast horses would bring the fresh fruit from Guangdong. There was great demand for lychee in the Song Dynasty (960-1279), according to Cai Xiang in his Li chi pu (Treatise on Lychees). It was also the favorite fruit of Emperor Li Longji's (Xuanzong) favored concubine Yang Yuhuan (Yang Guifei). The emperor had the fruit delivered at great expense to the capital.

The lychee attracted the attention of European travelers, such as the Spanish bishop, explorer, and sinologist Juan González de Mendoza in his History of the Great and Mighty Kingdom of China (1585; English translation 1588), based on the reports of Spanish friars who had visited China in the 1570s and given the fruit high praise:

[T]hey haue a kinde of plummes, that they doo call lechias, that are of an exceeding gallant tast, and neuer hurteth any body, although they shoulde eate a great number of them.

Later the lychee was described and introduced to the West in 1656 by Michał Boym, a Polish Jesuit missionary.

Lychee trees were introduced to Jamaica by Chinese immigrants in the 18th century, where the fruit is associated with the Chinese Jamaican community. The fruit is featured in a popular Jamaican cake, called lychee cake, made of a light sponge cake, cream, and fruit. It has been one of the most popular cakes in Jamaica since its creation by baker Selena Wong in 1988.

The lychee tree was introduced in the northwestern parts of the Indian subcontinent in 1932 and remained an exotic plant until the 1960s, when commercial production began. The crop's production expanded from Begum Kot (Lahore District) in Punjab to Hazara, Haripur, Sialkot, and Mirpur Khas.

=== Double domestication ===
Genomic studies indicate that the lychee resulted from double domestication by independent cultivation in two different regions of ancient China.

== Cultivation and uses ==
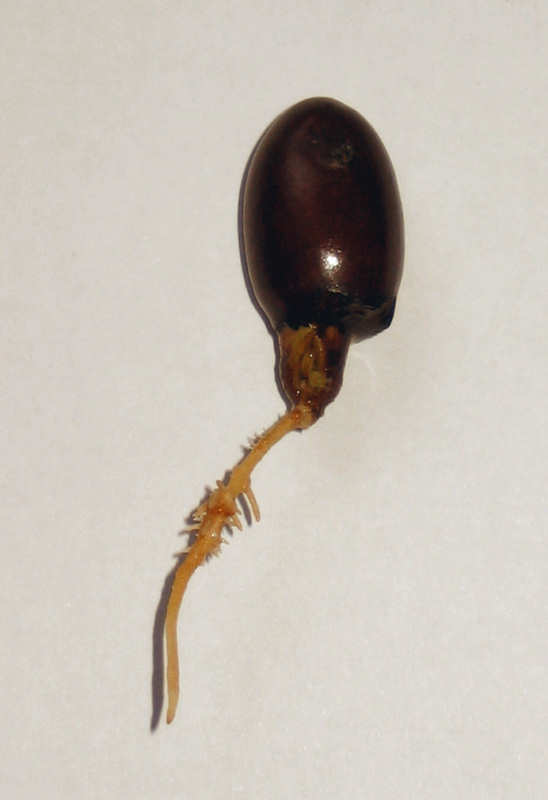
Germinating lychee seed with its main root (about 3 months old)

A normal-sized seed (left) and a small-sized (Chicken tongue) seed (right)

Lychees are extensively grown in southern China, Taiwan, Vietnam, the rest of tropical Southeast Asia, the Indian subcontinent, and in tropical regions of many other countries. They require a tropical climate that is frost-free and does not go below the temperature of −4 °C (25 °F), with high summer heat, rainfall, and humidity, growing optimally on well-drained, slightly acidic soils rich in organic matter and mulch.

Some 200 cultivars exist, with early and late maturing forms suited to warmer and cooler climates, respectively. In China eight cultivars are mainly used for commerce. Lychees are also grown as an ornamental tree. The most common propagation method for lychee is through air layering. Air-layers are made by cutting a branch of a mature tree, covering the cut with a rooting medium, such as peat or sphagnum moss, then wrapping the medium with polyethylene film and allowing the cut to root. Once significant rooting has occurred, the layer is cut from the branch and potted.

According to folklore, a lychee tree that is not producing much fruit can be girdled, leading to more fruit production. When the central opening of trees is carried out as part of training and pruning, stereo fruiting can be achieved for higher orchard productivity.

=== Culinary ===
Lychees are commonly sold fresh in Asian markets. The red rind turns dark brown when the fruit is refrigerated, but the taste is not affected. It is sold canned year-round. The fruit can be dried with the rind intact, at which point the flesh shrinks and darkens.

Lychees can be used to make lychee liquour and lychee wine.

=== Cultivars ===
There are numerous lychee cultivars, with considerable confusion regarding their naming and identification. The same cultivar grown in different climates can produce very different fruit. Cultivars can also have different synonyms in various parts of the world. Southeast Asian countries, along with Australia, use the original Chinese names for the main cultivars. India grows more than a dozen different cultivars. South Africa grows mainly the "Mauritius" cultivar. Most cultivars grown in the United States were imported from China, except for the "Groff", which was developed in the state of Hawaii.

Different cultivars of lychee are popular in various growing regions and countries. In China popular cultivars include Kwai Mai, Sanyuehong, Baitangying, Baila, Muzaffarpur, Samastipur, Shuidong, Feizixiao, Dazou, Heiye, Nuomici, Guiwei, Huaizhi, Lanzhu, and Chenzi. In Vietnam the most popular cultivar is Vai Thieu Hai Duong. In the U.S., production is based on several cultivars, including Mauritius, Brewster, and Hak Ip. India grows more than a dozen named cultivars, including Shahi (highest pulp percentage), Dehradun, Early Large Red, Kalkattia, and Rose Scented.

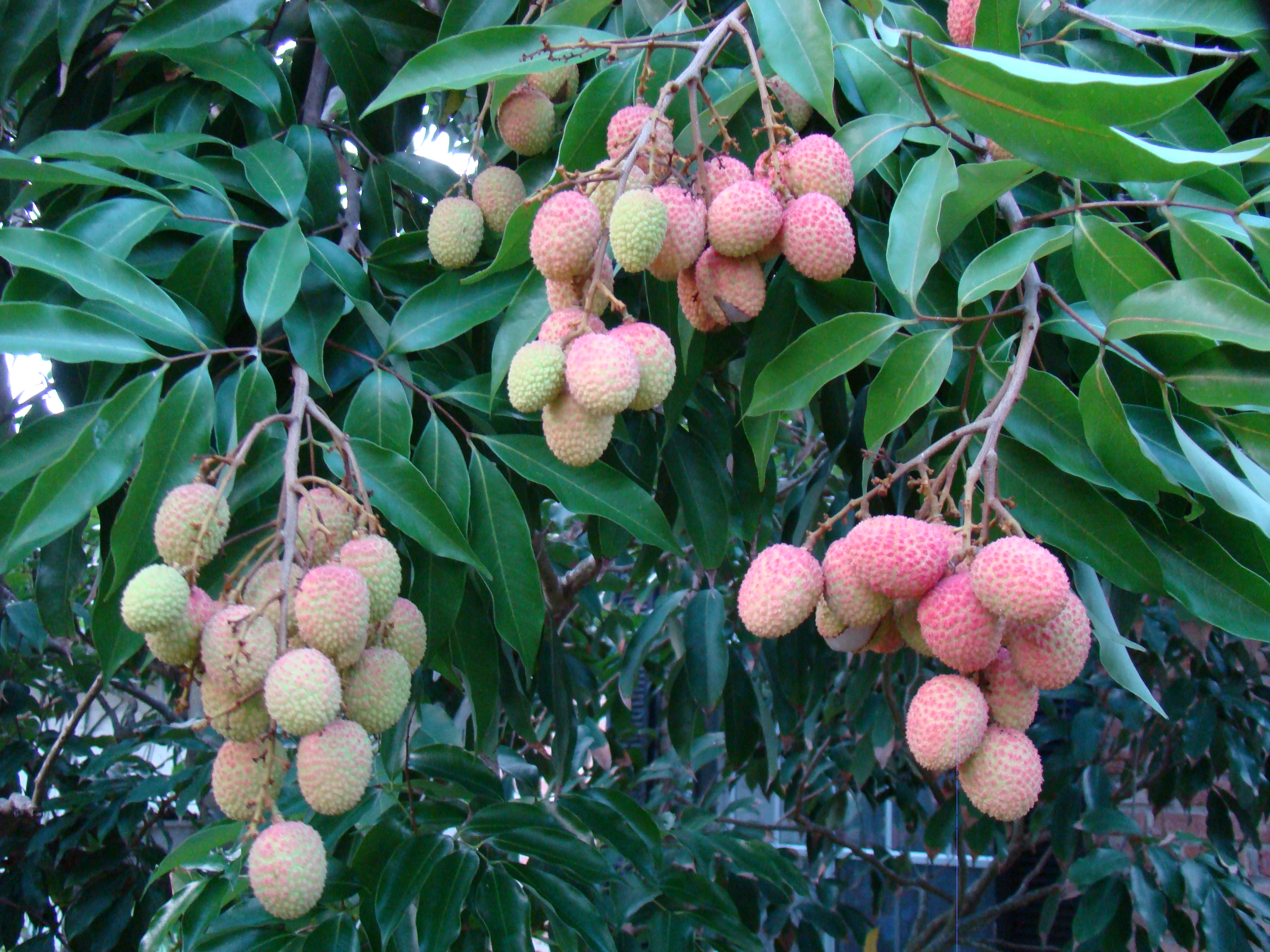
The Mauritius cultivar

=== Nutrients ===
Lychees, raw, 100 g
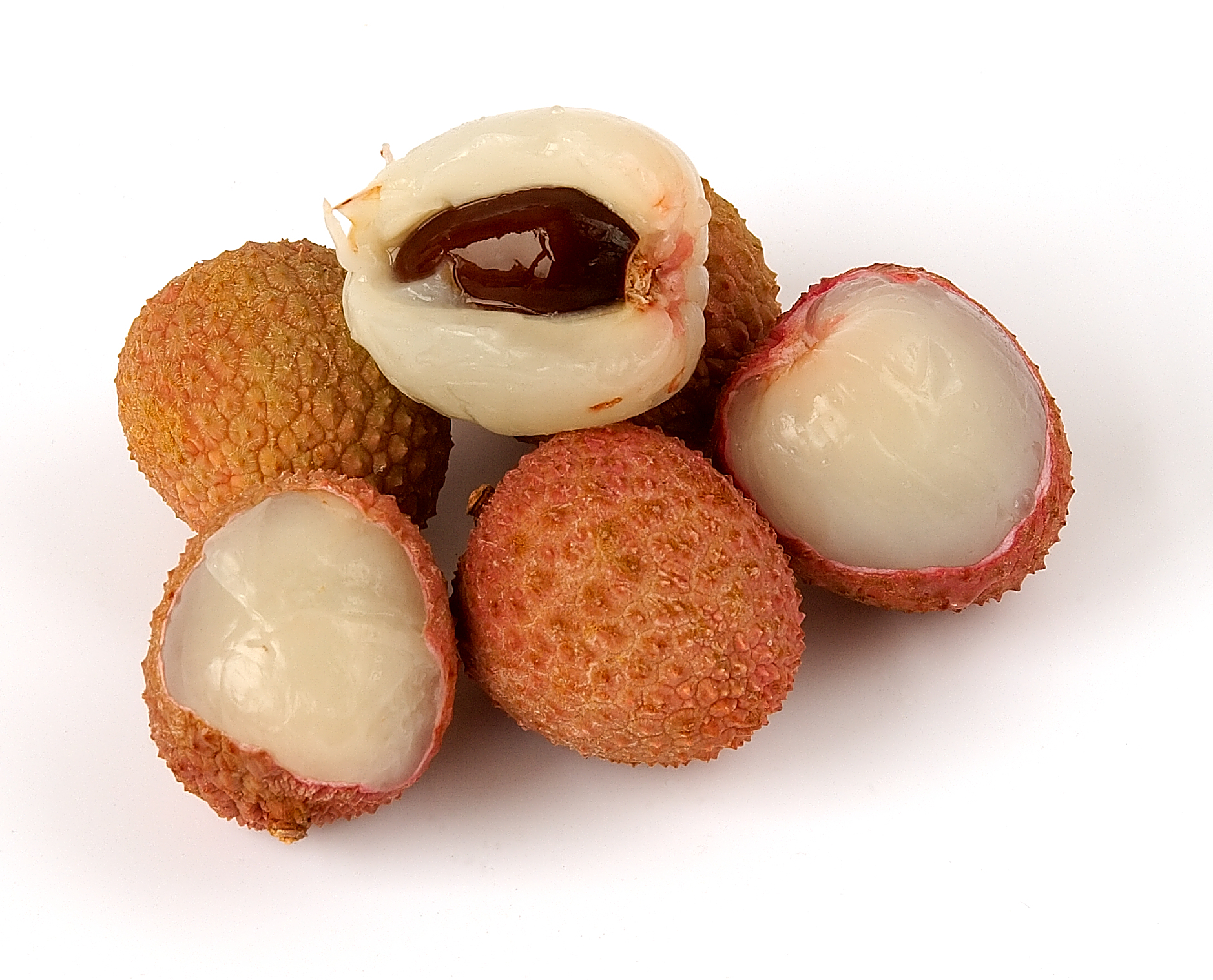
- Peeled lychee fruits

Nutritional value per 100 g (3.5 oz)
- Energy: 276 kJ (66 kcal)
- Carbohydrates: 16.53 g
- Sugars: 15.23 g
- Dietary fiber: 1.3 g
- Fat: 0.44 g
- Protein: 0.83 g
Vitamins and minerals
Vitamins	Quantity %DV^{†}
Thiamine (B1)	1% 0.011 mg
Riboflavin (B2)	5% 0.065 mg
Niacin (B3)	4% 0.603 mg
Vitamin B6	6% 0.1 mg
Folate (B9)	4% 14 μg
Vitamin C	79% 71.5 mg
Minerals	Quantity %DV^{†}
Calcium	0% 5 mg
Iron	1% 0.13 mg
Magnesium	2% 10 mg
Manganese	2% 0.055 mg
Phosphorus	2% 31 mg
Potassium	6% 171 mg
Sodium	0% 1 mg
Zinc	1% 0.07 mg
- Other constituents: Quantity
- Water: 81.8 g
- Full Link to USDA entry in FoodData Central
- ^{†}Percentages estimated using US recommendations for adults, except for potassium, which is estimated based on expert recommendation from the National Academies.

Raw lychee fruit is 82% water, 17% carbohydrates, 1% protein, containing negligible fat (table). In a 100-gram (3.5 oz) reference amount, raw lychee fruit supplies 66 calories of food energy. The raw pulp is rich in vitamin C, having 72 mg per 100 grams – an amount representing 79% of the Daily Value – but contains no other micronutrients in significant content (table).

=== Phytochemicals ===
Lychees have moderate amounts of polyphenols, including flavan-3-ol monomers and dimers as major compounds representing about 87% of total polyphenols, which declines in content during storage or browning. Cyanidin-3-glucoside represents 92% of total anthocyanins.

== Poisoning ==
In 1962 it was found that lychee seeds contain methylenecyclopropylglycine (MCPG), a homologue of hypoglycin A, which causes hypoglycemia in human and animal studies. Since the end of the 1990s, unexplained outbreaks of encephalopathy has been documented, appearing to affect only children in India (where it is called chamki bukhar) and northern Vietnam (where it is called Ac Mong encephalitis after the Vietnamese word for nightmare, ác mộng) during the lychee harvest season from May to June or July.

A 2013 investigation by the U.S. Centers for Disease Control and Prevention (CDC) in India showed that cases were linked to the consumption of lychee fruit, causing a non-inflammatory encephalopathy that mimicked symptoms of Jamaican vomiting sickness. Because low blood sugar (hypoglycemia) of less than 70 mg/dL in the undernourished children on admission was common, and associated with a poorer outcome (44% of all cases were fatal), the CDC identified the illness as a hypoglycemic encephalopathy.

The investigation linked the illness to hypoglycin A and MCPG toxicity and to malnourished children eating lychees (particularly unripe ones) on an empty stomach.

The CDC report recommended that parents ensure their children limit lychee consumption and have an evening meal, elevating blood glucose levels that may be sufficient to deter illness. Education campaigns aimed at reducing the prevalence of lychee-associated encephalopathy have been launched, some before the mechanism of toxicity was elucidated, for example, beginning in 1995 in China.

Earlier studies had incorrectly concluded that transmission may occur from direct contact with lychees contaminated by bat saliva, urine, or guano or with other vectors such as insects, found in lychee trees, or sand flies, as in the case of Chandipura virus. A 2017 study found that pesticides used in the plantations could be responsible for the encephalitis and deaths of young children in Bangladesh.

== Gallery ==
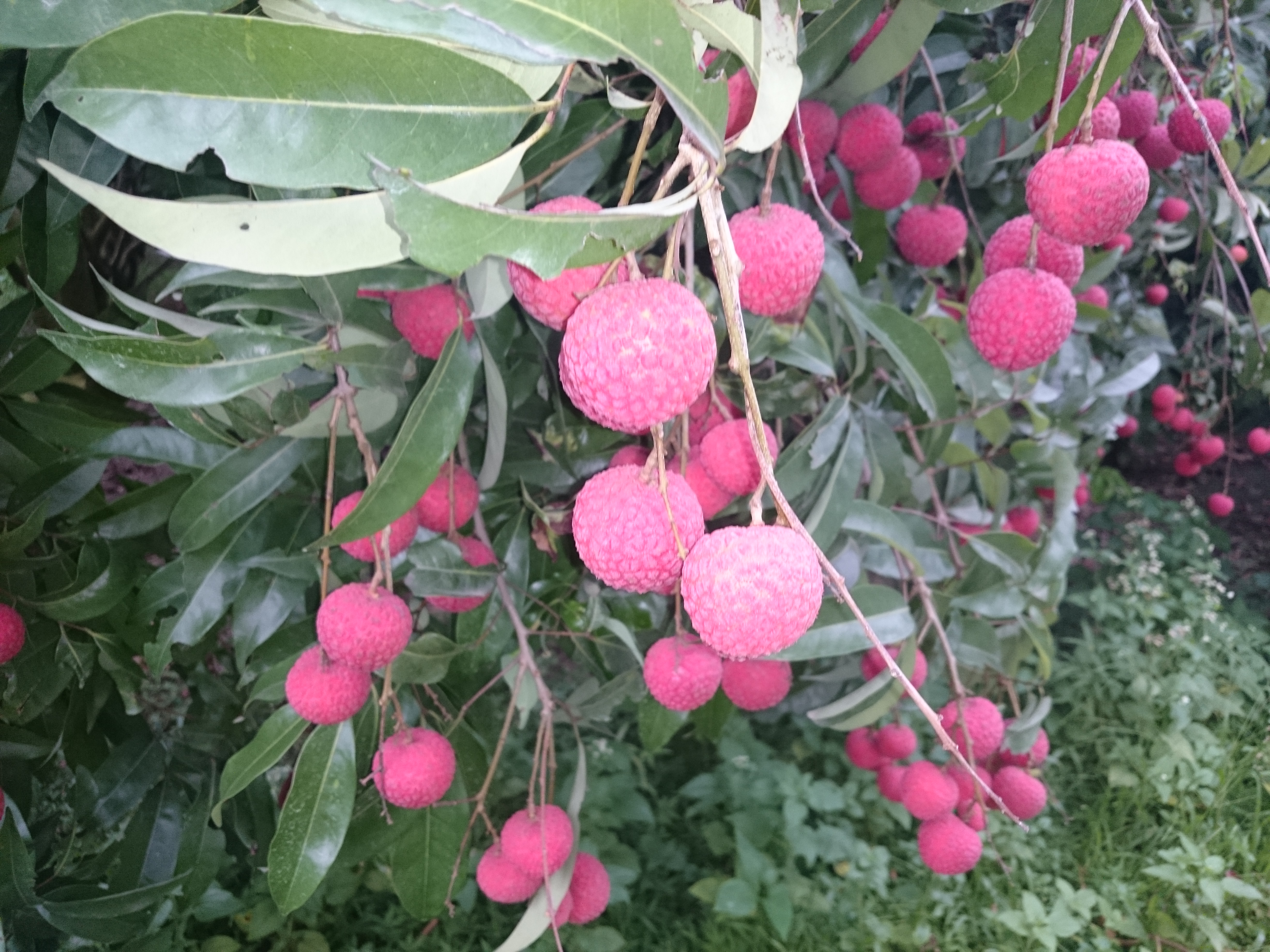
China 3 cultivar of lychee fruit

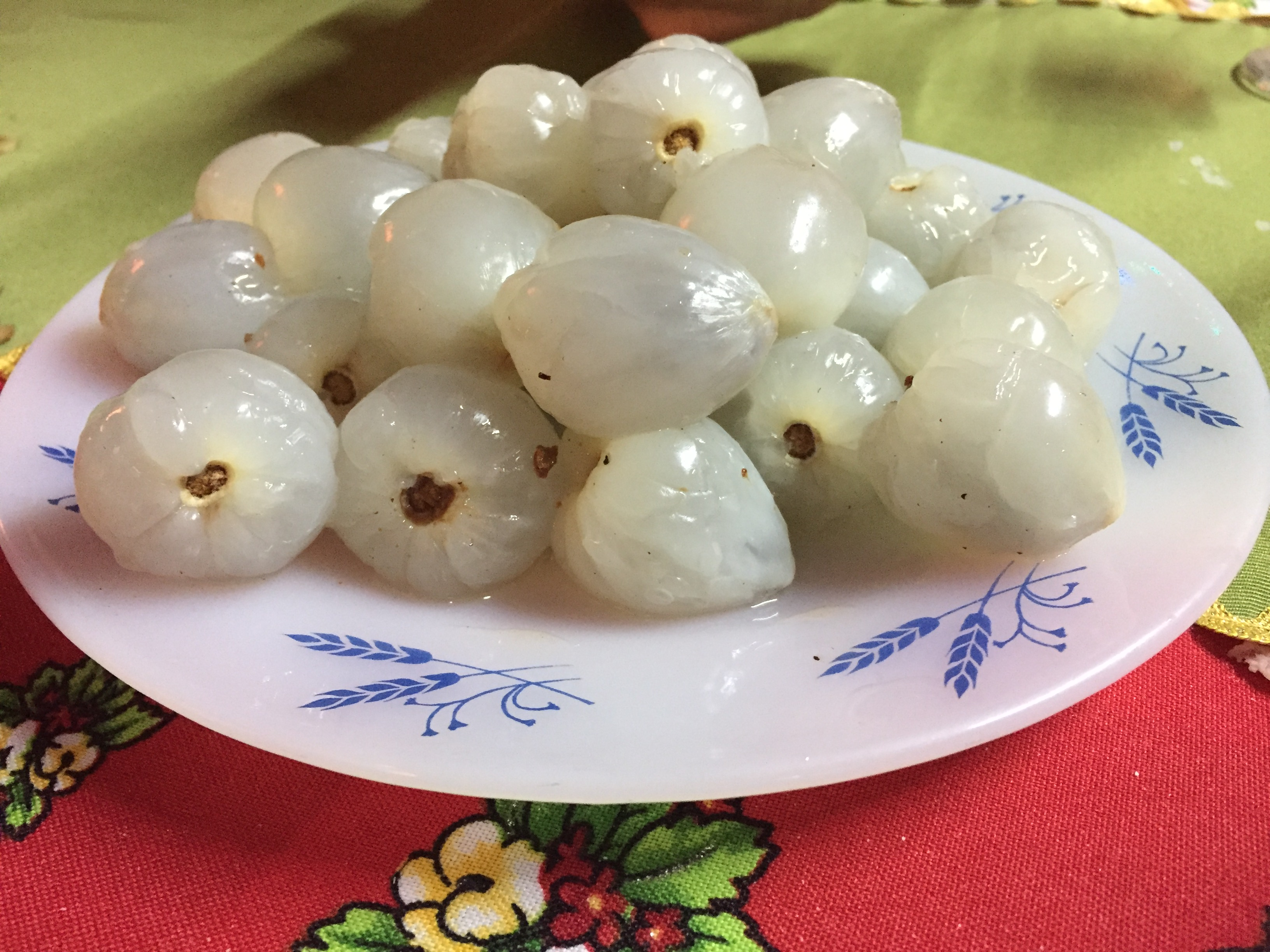
Peeled lychee fruits

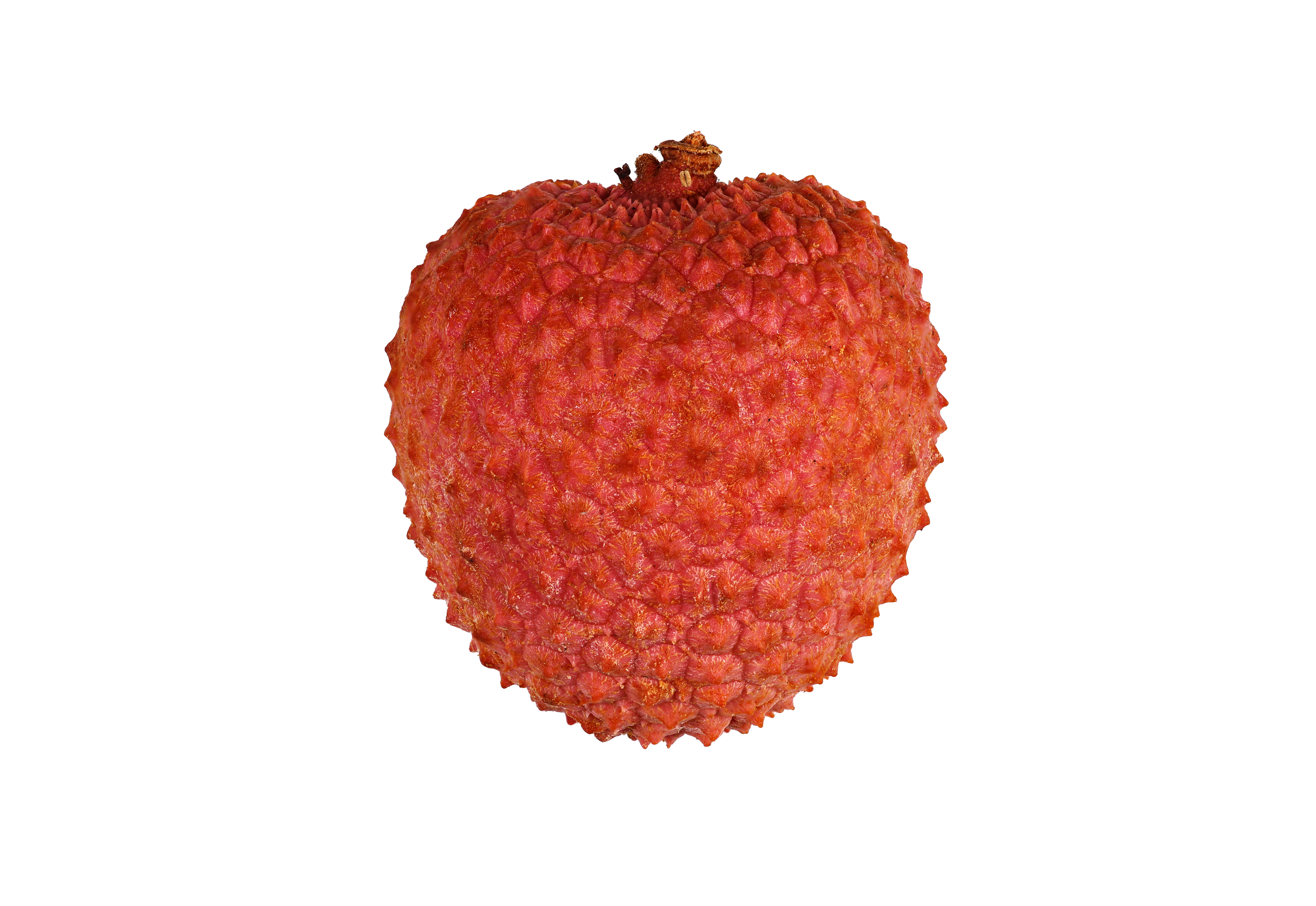
Lychee fruit

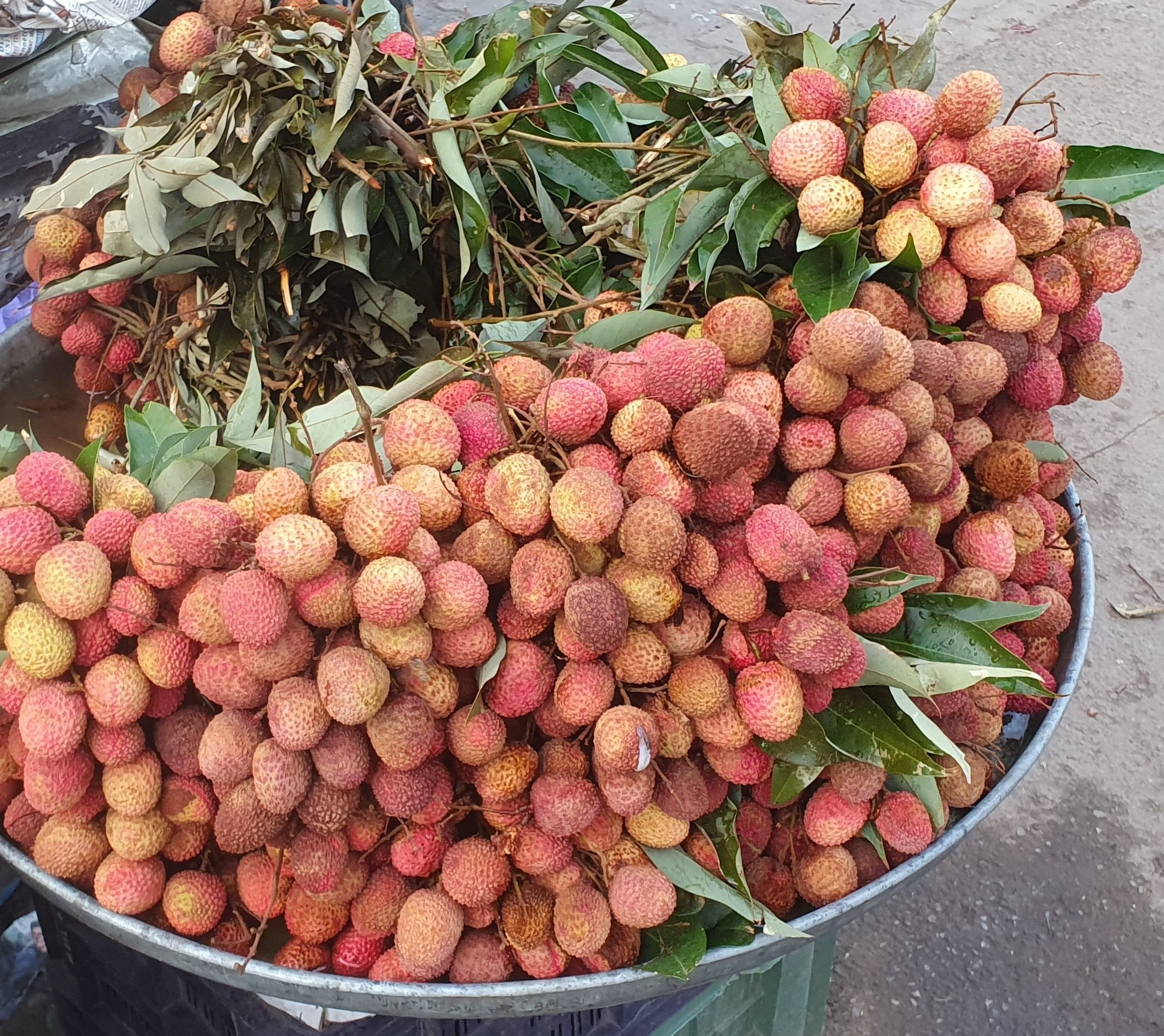
Lychees at a market in Uttar Pradesh, India

== See also ==
- China 3 lychee
- Chinese food therapy
- Korlan
- Lanzones
- Lichido liqueur
- List of culinary fruits
- Longan
- Lychee wine
- Melicoccus bijugatus
- Rambutan
