= China 3 lychee =

Variety of fruit

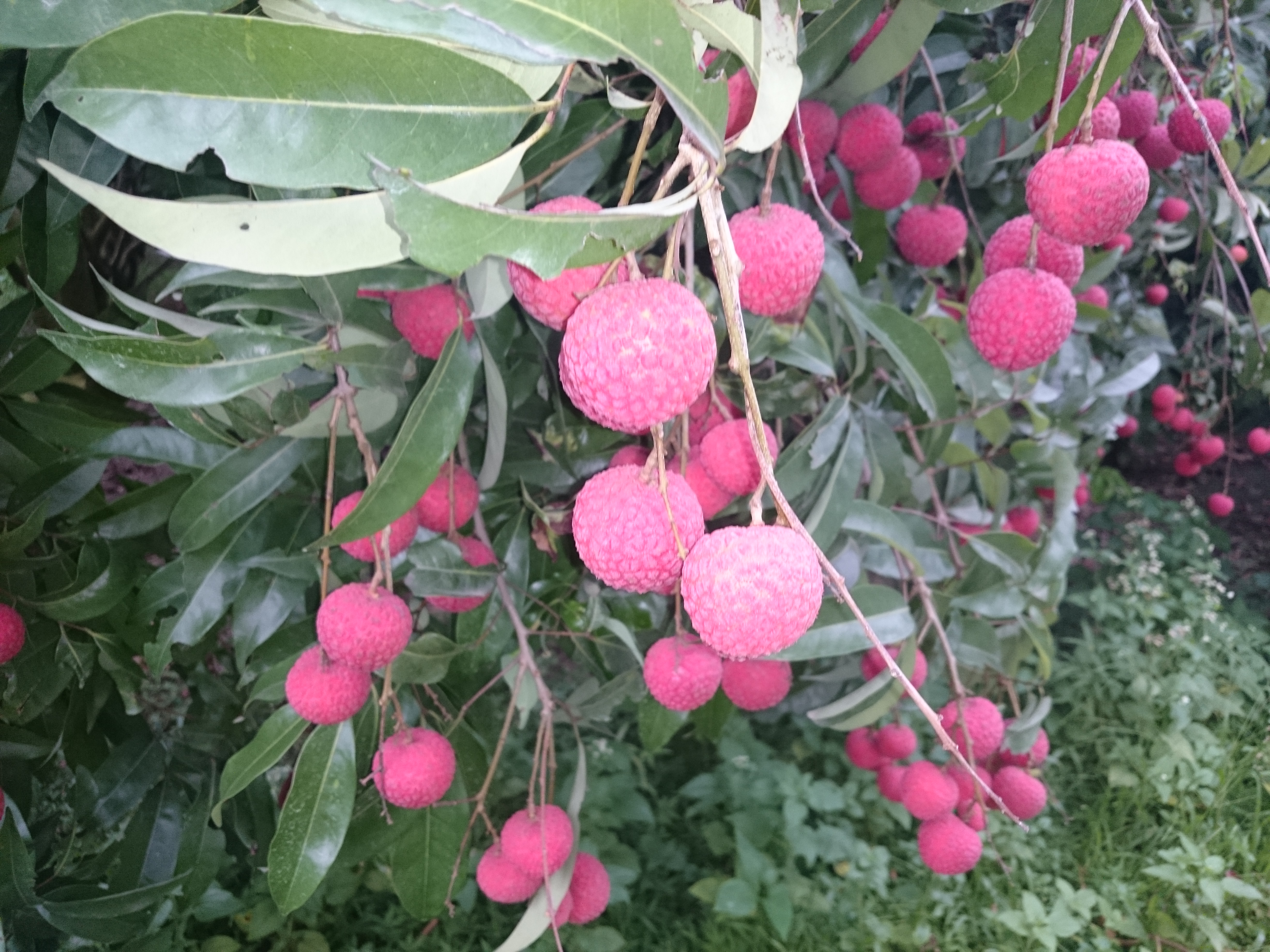
- China-3 lychee from Tanvir Agro Farm, Bogura, Bangladesh.
- Genus: Litchi
- Species: Litchi chinensis
- Cultivar: China-3
- Origin: China

China 3 is a variety of lychee fruit, belonging to the family Sapindaceae and tribe Nepheleae. This variety is one of the best grown in Bengal region in the eastern part of the Indian subcontinent. The trees are only about 5 to 6 m tall with relatively smaller leaves. Bearing is regular if proper management and care is taken, otherwise they show an irregular bearing habit. China-3 was found to perform satisfactorily in other areas, except where rain starts earlier.

It is a late variety and fruits ripen in the last week of June. The average yield is 124 kg per tree. The round fruit is bigger with attractive red, orange skin colour. The pulp is creamy white, soft and juicy.

== Description ==
China 3 is a variety of lychee fruit. It is a late variety and fruits ripen in the last week of June. The average yield per tree is 124 kg. However, it does not bear fruit on a regular basis. The fruit size of China 3 is bigger with an attractive skin colour. Fruits are globose, with a composition of red, orange and patches of green colour. The average weight of the fruit is 25 g. The pulp is creamy white, soft and succulent. TSS is 18%, seeds are small with a pulp-seed ratio of 15:1.

== Cultivation ==
The planting of China 3 lychee is generally done during June–July i.e. the rainy season, but the best planting time is April–June when the weather is humid but not too wet or too dry. Planting may also be done after the rainy season, i.e. August–September, but regular irrigation is required for better establishment of the orchard. In old orchards lychee trees were planted 10–12 m apart both ways i.e. in rows and between plants in rows. The spacing of 10 m is found to be adequate in areas where the soil is deep loam and fertile, and when necessary care is taken during the initial stage of cultivation. In other areas 7–8 m distance was found to be sufficient. At the present, high density plantation has also started. In the case of high density planting the spacing is 4 m x 4 m.

== Harvest ==
Fruit quality of China 3 is the best among the available land races, the vast majority of which are harsher in taste with a low pulp:seed ratio. The recently released BARI Lichu 3 resembles China 3 in size, shape, quality and taste, but is yet to be distributed to farmers. The yield of China 3 lychee in Bangladesh, Eastern India and Northeastern India is growing, however, the average yield of lychee is far less and it can still be increased substantially.

== Gallery ==
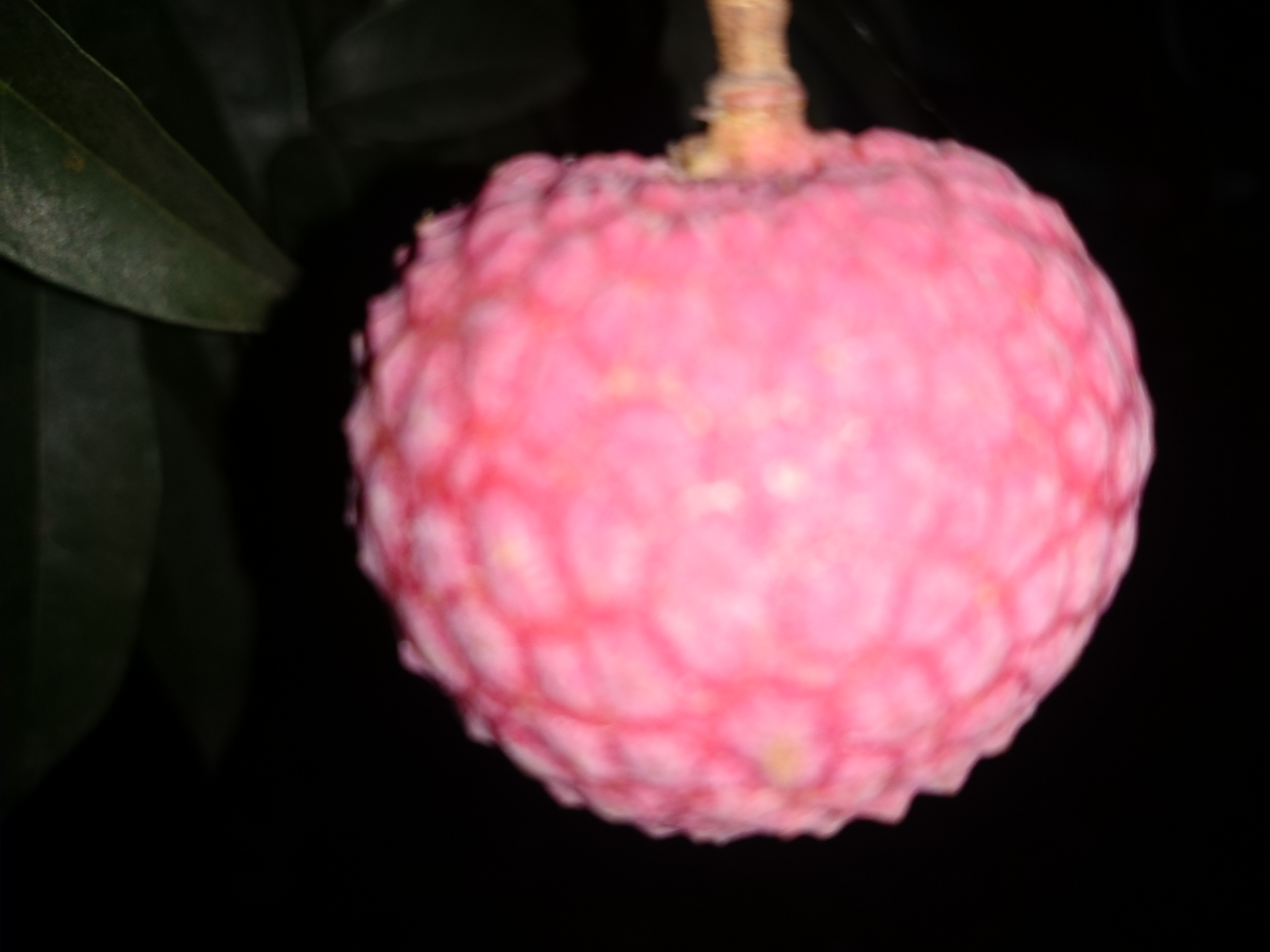
A nearly ripened purple china 3 lychee, Bogura.

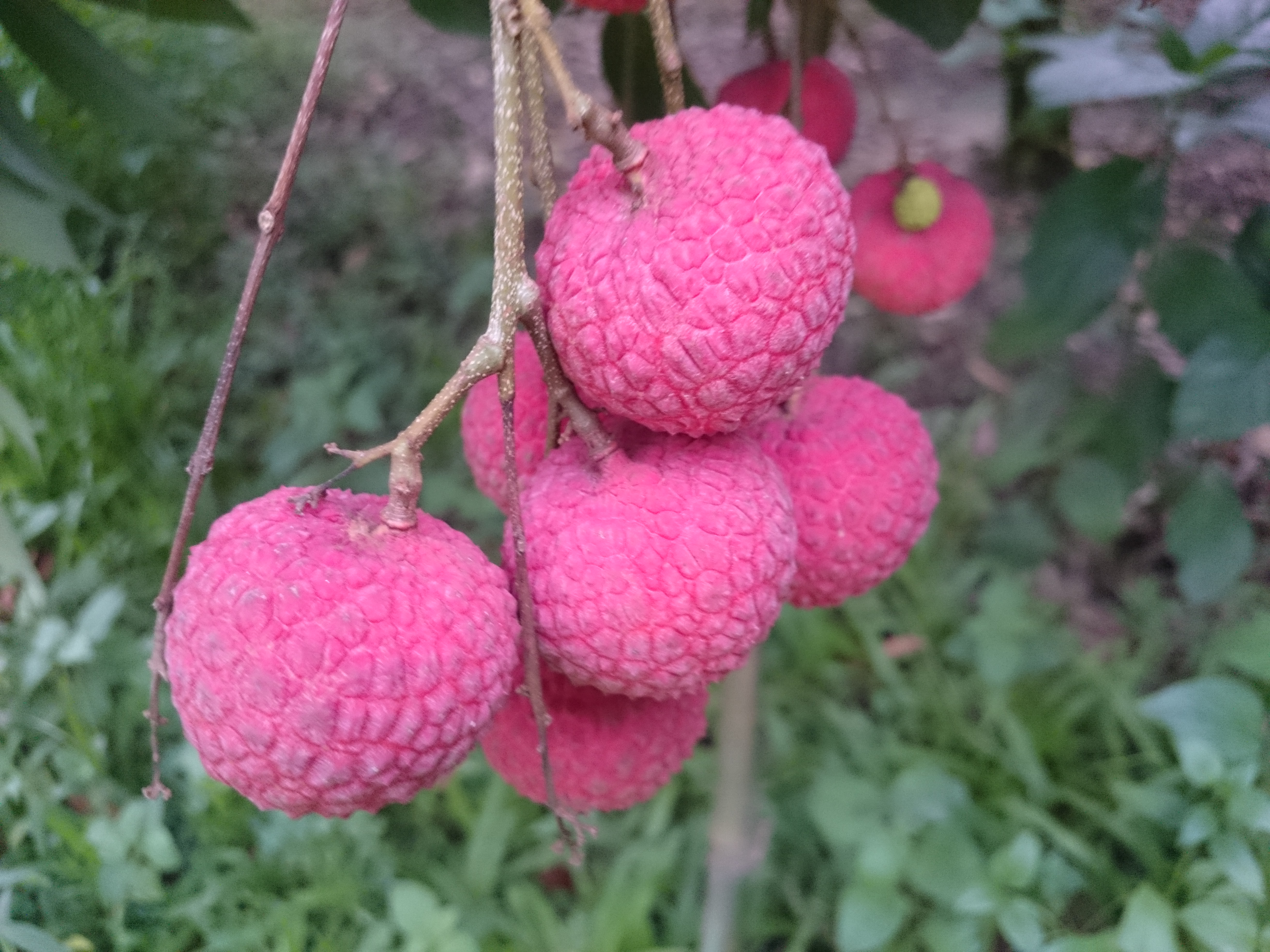
25 g. weight of each lychee.

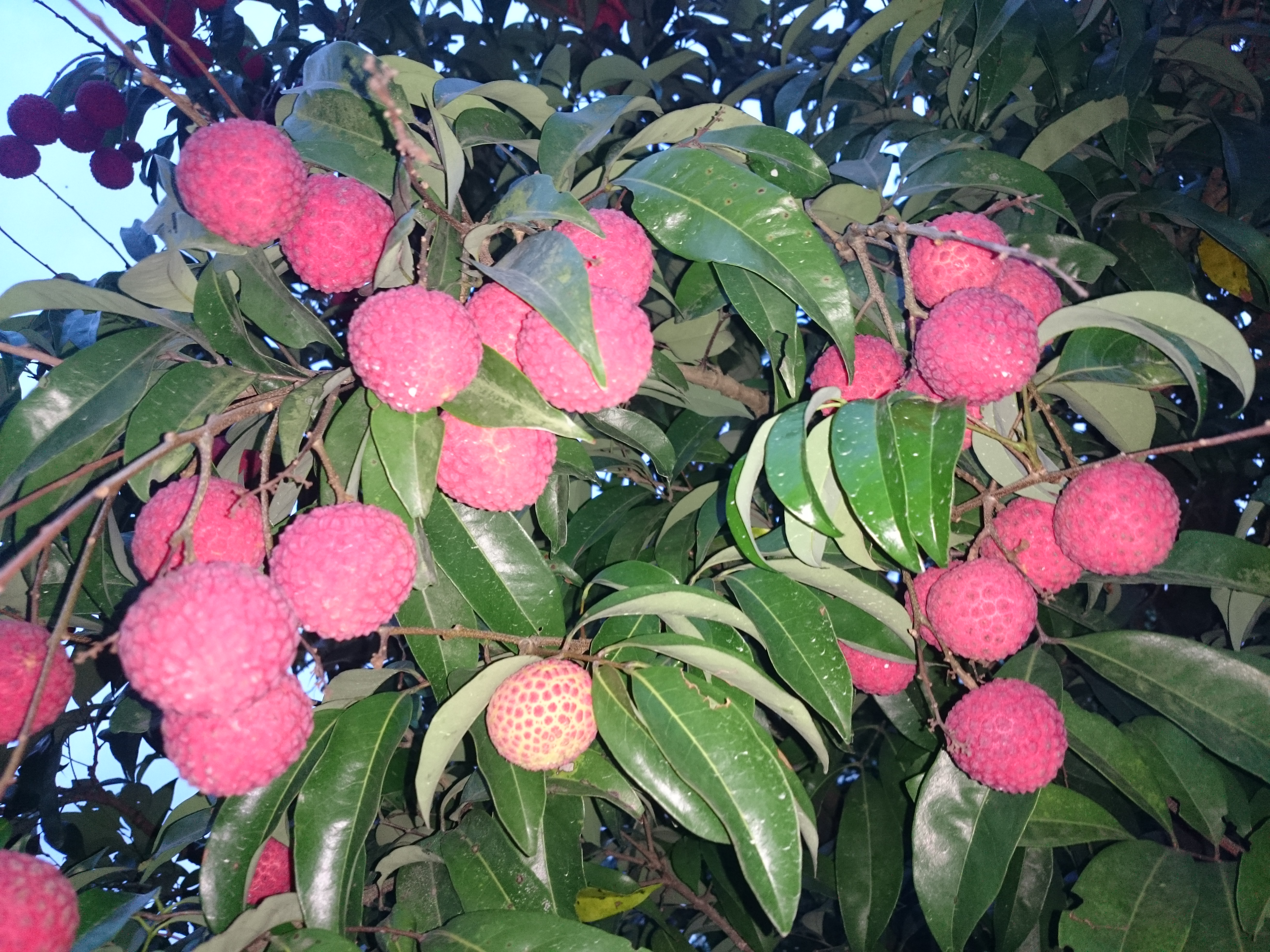
China-3 lychee from Tanvir Agro Farm, Bogura, Bangladesh.
