= Stereo fruiting =

Stereo fruiting is a pattern of fruiting in which both the outer and inner canopy of a tree produces fruits. This type of fruiting can be observed in fruit crops like litchi (Litchi chinensis) when the centre opening of trees is carried out as part of training and pruning.
