= Lychee wine =

Cantonese dessert wine

Lychee wine

Lychee wine (Chinese: 荔枝酒, lìzhījiǔ) is a full-bodied Cantonese dessert wine made of 100% lychee fruit. Lychee fruit has a golden colour and rosy flavor, which brings a similar colour and subtle berry flavor to the wine. Lychee wine can be consumed fresh or preserved for years before serving. It is usually served ice cold, either straight up or on the rocks with food. Lychee wine is believed to pair better with shellfish and Asian cuisine than with heavier meat dishes. This refreshing beverage can also be used as a cocktail mixer paired with other spirits.

Lychee wine is a low-alcohol and high-flavored Cantonese beverage made of fresh lychee fruits using partial osmotic dehydration techniques. It usually contains 10–18% alcohol, 1–4% sugar, and 0.3–1% acid. Also, extra tannin is added to the wine to get rid of the loamy mellow tones. The nutrients and flavour are concentrated and retained thanks to dehydration pretreatment and this can also be seen from the product the usage of untreated fruits.

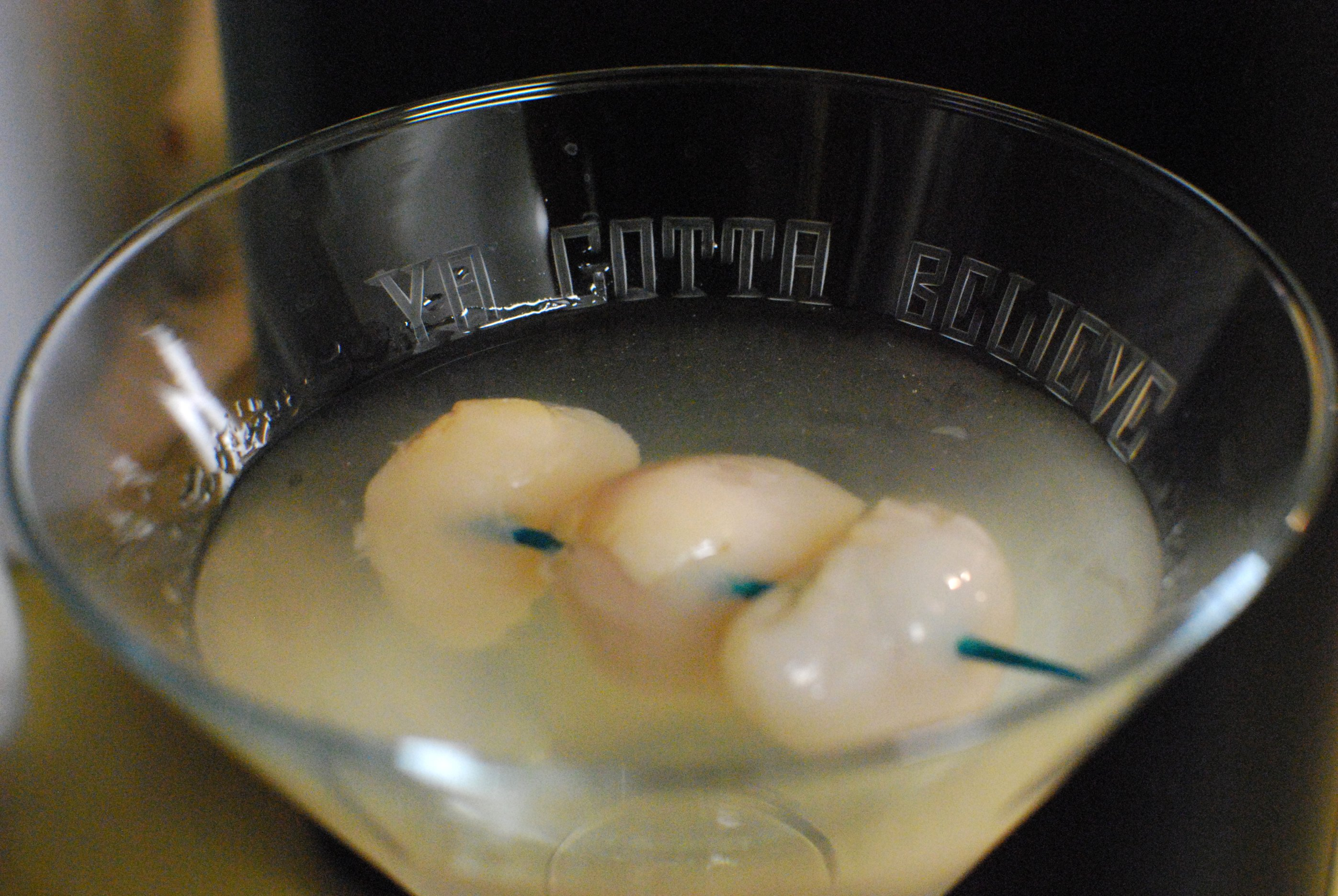
Lychee cocktail

Archaeology has proved that ancient Sinae brewed wine, although the winemaking technique and flavor might be completely different from the modern age. Lychee wine has been devised in Canton since at least the Tang Dynasty. The Xuzhoufu lychee wine used to be exclusive for the imperial family in the Qing dynasty.

Lychee wine is a healthy fruit wine made of high-quality fresh lychee as raw material, which is fermented at low temperature after washing, draining, peeling, pitting, and juice extraction. The market prospect is broad. Lychee, as one of the unique fruits in Lingnan, has developed rapidly since the 1990s. The planting area has continued to increase and the lychee yield has continued to increase.

However, due to the short harvest period and unsuitable storage of lychee, farmers growing lychee did not get enough profits when the lychee was harvested, which significantly restricted the development of the lychee industry. Although the country has done a lot of research on the preservation and storage of lychee, and the researchers have come up with some solutions, it is still difficult to expand it on a bigger scale due to high costs. Therefore, vigorously producing and developing lychee wine will help solve the problem of first, the short period of time of storage of lychee, and second, the lack of development of the lychee industry. Moreover, lychee wine is comparatively a healthier alcoholic drink and it can meet the needs of people's healthy drinking lifestyle.

== Markets ==
The annual production of fruit wine in the world is about 30 million tons. The annual production of lychee fruit in Guangdong Province is more than 5 million tons. If all the fresh lychees produced in Guangdong are used for winemaking, only 1.5 million tons of lychee wine can be produced. In the domestic market in China, Guangdong ’s annual consumption of fruit wine amounts to 300 thousand tons, but China ’s per capita annual consumption of fruit wine is only 0.2 to 0.3 L, which is a big gap between the world ’s per capita consumption of 6 L.

Right now, there are not many manufacturers of lychee wine in China, and most of them manufacturers' production is relatively small. The companies that produce lychee wine are mainly Guangdong Huilai Di Nong Liquor Co., Ltd., Guangdong Changle Shochu Industry Co., Ltd., Guangdong Yinzhou Group Co., Ltd., Guangdong Conghua Shunchangyuan Winery, Guangdong Twelve Ling Liquor Co., Ltd., etc.,

Lychee in China is mainly harvested by hand. The cost of picking is high and therefore the supply is relatively slow. Although the production process of lychee wine is relatively strict, it is still difficult to ensure that the lychee wine has a good quality and great taste due to the difficulties caused by the storage of lychee.

== Production ==
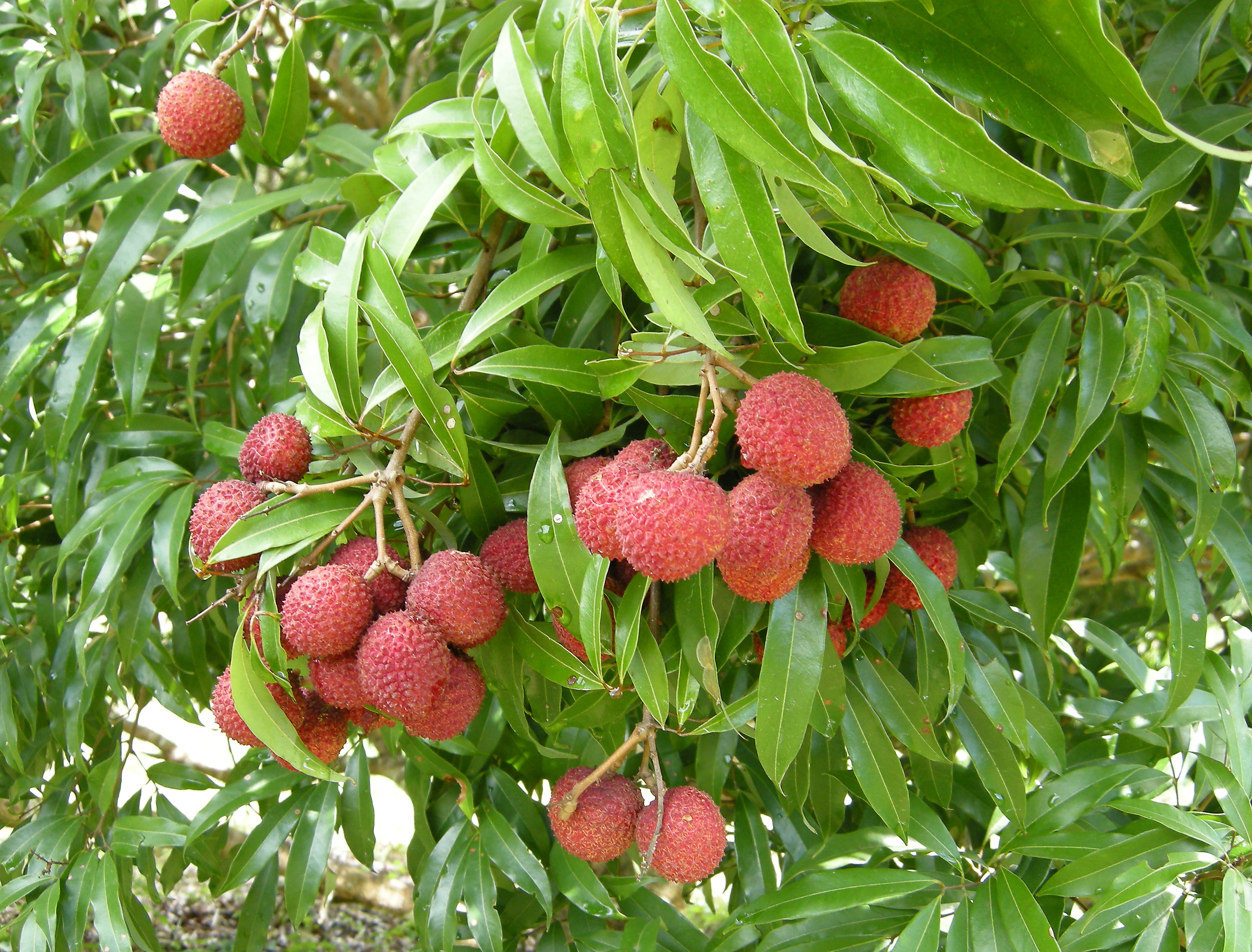
Lychee Tree

Lychee fruits of optimum maturity are washed and peeled. The treated fruits are taken out, followed by pulping in a pulper. Then the lychee fruits are drained into a bucket for 4–8 hours at 10~15 °C, and then cooled to 8–10 °C and drained for another 10 hours. The sugar contents are adjusted to 22° Bx by dilution with water and then mixed thoroughly together with 100 mg/L sulfur dioxide and 80~120 mg/L activated liquid pectinase. The treated lychee juice is then frozen to obtain the condensed juice that is full of a sweet and sour flavor. Afterward, the condensed juice is warmed up to 10–12 °C. A 24h-old active culture of yeast (Saccharomyces cerevisiae is added at 5% to the sterilised lychee juice to carry out the alcoholic fermentation. The fermentation is carried as a routine practice and allowed to continue until the TSS comes to 7° Bx; this procedure usually takes several weeks. The wine is filtered and stored at 10–15 °C, and the ideal maturation process takes about three months. Slight adjustments are often made based on the flavor and alcohol content of the wine, followed by sterilization and then the beverage is dispensed into glass bottles, which are closed with crown corks. The initial lychee juice contains a large amount of fermentable sugars and high acid content which make the liquid suitable for winemaking. Lychee wine produced from reconstituted lychee juice concentrate under optimized conditions contain 11.6% ethanol, 92 mg/L total esters, 124 mg/L total aldehydes, and 0.78% titratable acidity. Sensory evaluation reveals a clean, light amber color, an attractive aroma of the natural lychee fruit, and a harmonious wine taste.

=== Lychee processing ===
It is the first step in lychee wine production. After picking, the lychee fruits of optimum maturity are washed, peeled and seeded by hand or husking machine. The treated fruits are taken out, conveyed by a screw mechanism, followed by pulping in a pulper.

=== Crushing ===
After peeling, the lychees are lightly or fully crushed. Crushers usually consist of several stainless steel rollers and gaps. They can be adjusted to different modes, light, strong or no crushing, depending on the winemaker's preference.

The mix of lychee fruit and juice is then transferred to a vessel, usually a tank made of stainless steel or glass for fermentation.

=== Additions ===
Sulfur dioxide is added when the lychee pulp is pumped to the containers. The addition rate varies from 0–100 mg/L. The purpose of sulfur dioxide is to prevent oxidation and delay the onset of fermentation.

Pectinase is added at this stage to improve the extraction of the color and flavor from the lychee and to facilitate pressing. The addition rate of macerating enzyme ranges from 80–120 mg/L. According to the previous experiment, 0.2% activated liquid pectinase is usually the preferred reception.

Tannin is the optional addition in the winemaking process. It can contribute to help stabilize color and prevent oxidation to remove the effects of rot.

The sweetener may be added now, later or even not at all according to the preference of winemakers.

=== Fermentation ===
It is a process of transferring the sugar present in the fruit into alcohol with heat as the byproduct. The natural yeast from the fruit and the environment start to carry out the alcoholic fermentation once the lychee pulp is in the fermentation vessel. Different winemakers have their own choices of specially selected yeast and the addition rate of yeast. There are hundreds of different strains of wine yeast are commercially available, many winemakers believe that specific strains of yeast are more or less suitable for different lychee varieties and different types of wine.

The fermentation is carried as a routine practice and allowed to continue until the total suspended solid rate comes to 7°Bx, this procedure usually takes several weeks for lychee wine.

=== Bottling ===
Most winemakers choose to filter the wine before bottling, although some of them use the absence of filtration as a marketing tool. Filtration is designed to clarify the wine and eliminate any remaining yeast and bacteria, which can stabilize the microenvironment in the bottled wine. Lychee wine is often dispensed into glass bottles with cork stoppers, but sometimes aluminium screw caps.

== Classification ==
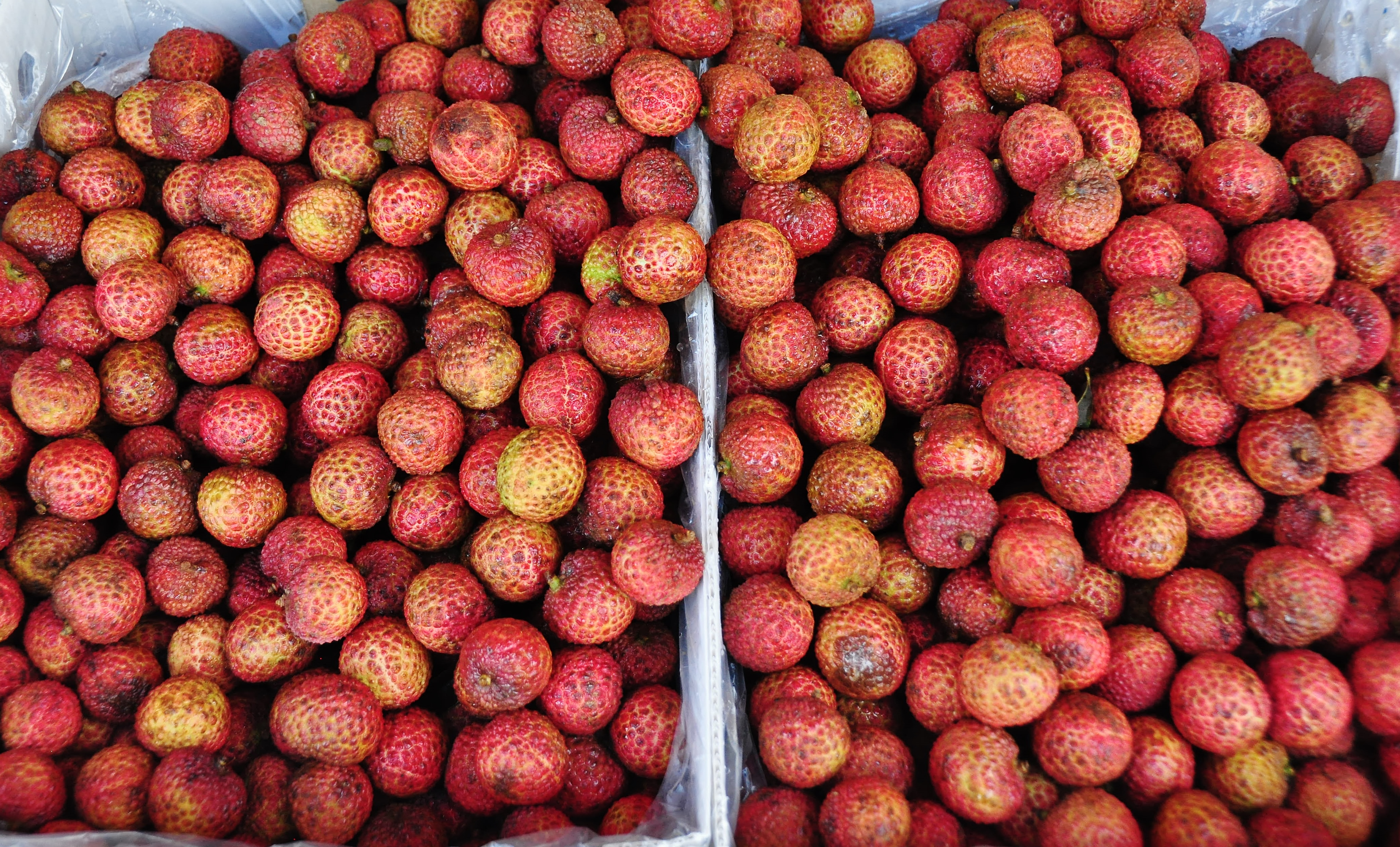
Lychee fruit in Chinatown Toronto

This is the formal classification for all Chinese wines. There are three categories: dry, semi-dry, semi-sweet. Classified by sugar content (g/L)

- Dry (Gan, 乾, 干): with sugar content ≤4.0
- Semi-dry (Ban Gan, 半乾, 半干): with sugar content 4.1–12.0
- Semi-sweet (Ban Tian, 半甜): with sugar content 12.1–50.0

== Lychee varieties ==
Typical lychees used for lychee wine production are Feizixiao, mainly in Guangdong, China, considered to be the noblest variety by Cantonese winemakers. The fragrance, sugar and acid content of lychee are the main factors of wine quality. Many vintners are experimenting with making lychee wine from other varieties, such as Nuomici and Sanyuehong.

== See also ==
- Wine in China
- Longan wine
- Lichido
- Huangjiu
- Baijiu
