= Kwai Mai (lychee) =

Chinese lychee cultivar

Kwai Mai (Kwai Mai Pink/Bosworth 3)
- Species: Litchi chinensis
- Origin: South China

The Kwai Mai lychee is a highly regarded cultivar of the lychee fruit (Litchi chinensis), particularly popular in Australia and other regions for its excellent taste and attractive appearance. It is also sometimes known as 'Kwai Mai Pink' or 'Bosworth 3 (abbreviated as "B3")' in Australia.

The Kwai Mai variety was imported from Southern China in the 1930s, particularly to Australia where it has become a prominent and highly regarded commercial cultivar.

== Origin and history ==
Specific cultivars like 'Kwai Mai' have a long history, with some Chinese lychee varieties reported to be 500 to 600 years old or more. The 'Kwai Mai' cultivar was among those introduced to other countries, including Australia, where it has become a widely grown and commercially important variety, especially for export.

== Cultivation ==
Kwai Mai lychee trees thrive in warm conditions with full sun exposure and protection from strong winds. While they prefer moist, well-drained soil, they are adaptable to a range of soil types, though acidic soils (pH 5.0-6.5) are generally preferred. Compared to many other lychee cultivars, 'Kwai Mai Pink' is considered a cold-hardy variety, capable of tolerating temperatures as low as -4°C without significant damage to the tree or fruit. This makes it suitable for cultivation in cooler subtropical climates.
