= Lichido =

Brand of lychee-flavored liqueur

Lichido is a 36 proof lychee liqueur made with vodka, cognac, lychee and guava essences, and white peach juice. It is imported from the French city of Cognac. Launched in 2006, it may have become a defunct brand by 2013. A Washington Post reporter recalled it having "pink-and-purple bottle and unbelievably cloying taste."

== See also ==
- List of cocktails
- List of liqueurs
- List of fruit liqueurs
