= Dafour =

Central African people

Dafour was a people of the Lake Chad region and along the Upper Nile.

In a 19th century Western journal, the Dafour were described a Saharan caravan group from the Upper Nile, which traded in "slaves, ivory, and ostrich feathers."

== See also ==
- Central African Republic
- Congo
- French Equatorial Africa
