= Banana wine =

Fruit wine made from bananas

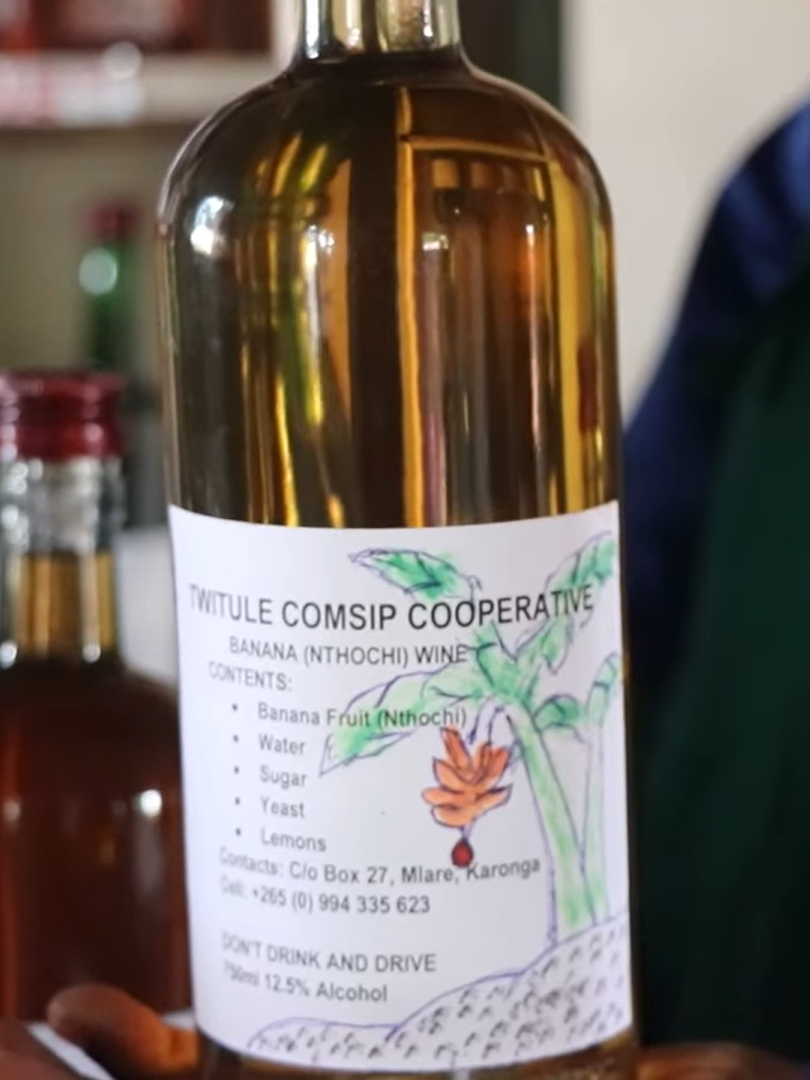
Banana wine from Malawi.

Banana wine is a fruit wine made exclusively from bananas. In Tanzania, banana wine is made commercially by fermenting peeled, mashed, ripe bananas and sugar. Water (to dilute the rather thick banana mash), wine yeast and sugar is added to the "banana mash".

The traditional processing of banana beer is different from that of commercial banana wine. For example, the process of making banana wine used by Banana Investment Ltd. is as follows:

1. Ripe bananas are peeled and put in plastic barrels filled with water.
2. The barrel contents are then pressed (mashed) and banana mash transferred to large metal pots and boiled for several hours, forming a base of juice and pulp.
3. The boiled banana mash is strained and sugar added to the leftover juice and boiled again.
4. The boiled juice is left to cool.
5. Wine yeast is added to the cooled, sweetened banana juice and placed in plastic fermentation tanks for 15 to 20 days, depending on product.
6. The fermented liquid is diluted with sterilized water, bottled and then shipped for distribution.

In commercial production, Cavendish bananas are used, while in informal production, a variety of cultivars, including both cooking and beer East African Highland bananas, Thai banana, Gros Michel, and apple bananas are used. Commercially produced banana wine is a clear, slightly sparkling alcoholic beverage with a longer shelf-life than banana beer, which is spoiled easily and therefore not stored for long periods. Depending on the strain of yeast and amount of sugar added, the sweetness and alcohol level in the final product is variable.

Production of banana wine is mostly at a small-scale level, though attempts have been made to bring it up to industrialized production, and there are commercial producers of banana wine (e.g. Arusha-based Banana Investment Ltd). Since the early 2000s, attempts have been made to expand banana wine production to other countries where the crop is prevalent. The Philippine government has sought to expand a local banana wine industry, while India has produced both award-winning banana wines and research into expanding production.
