= Maboké =

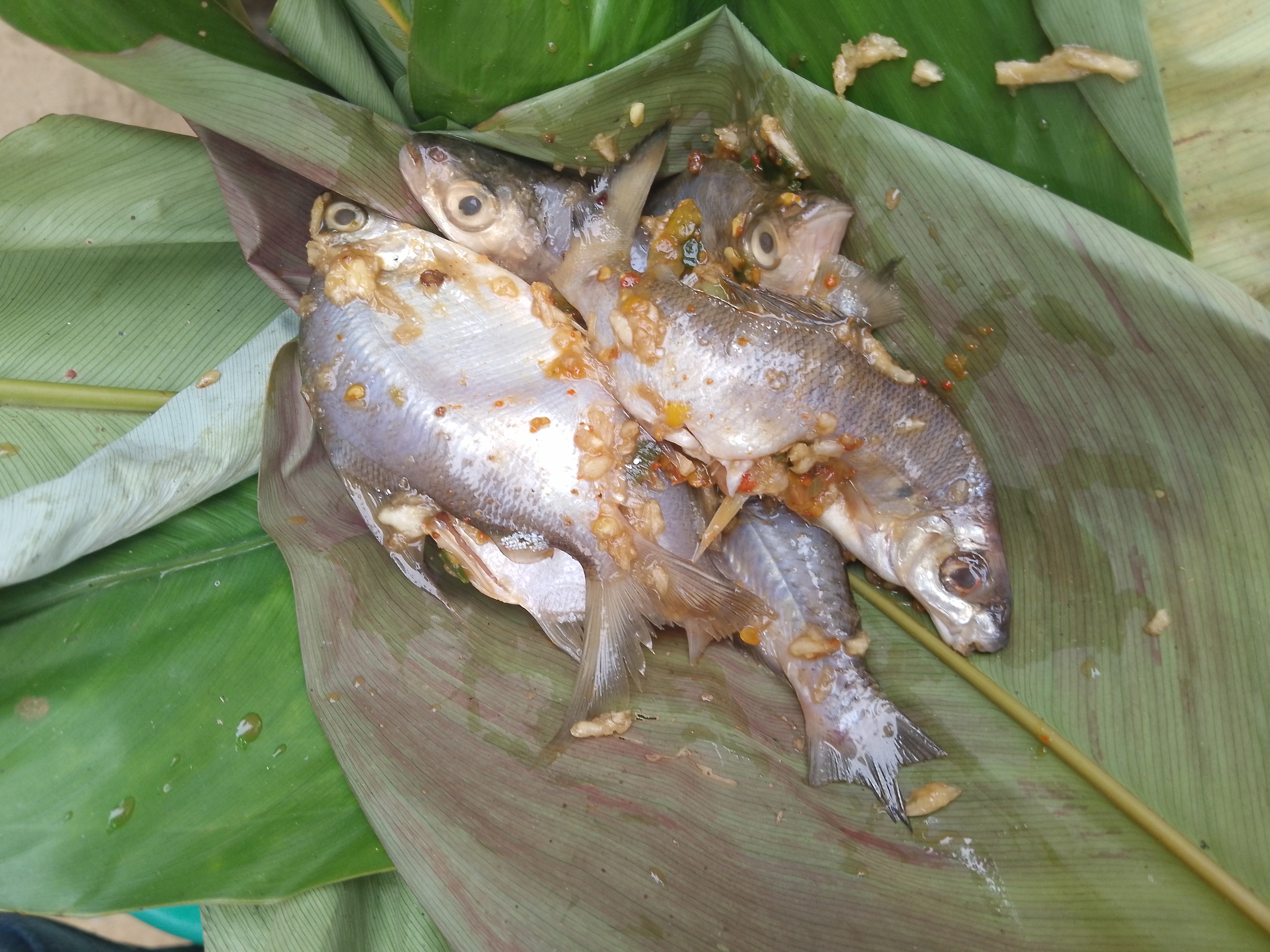
Maboké

Maboké is a dish from Central Africa. It is made of fish, with roasted spices, wrapped in cassava or banana leaves. It is mainly eaten in the Central African Republic and the Democratic Republic of the Congo, using many species of fish from the Congo River. It is sometimes served with fried plantains and rice.
