= JVS =

JVS may refer to:

- Jamaican vomiting sickness
- JAMMA Video Standard, a standard for arcade machines
- Joseph Vissarionovich Stalin, General Secretary of the Communist Party of the Soviet Union
- Journal of Vaishnava Studies
- Journal of Vascular Surgery
- Josephson voltage standard

== See also ==
- JV (disambiguation)
- JSV (disambiguation)
- SJV (disambiguation)
- SVJ (disambiguation)
- VJS (disambiguation)
