= Cedric Hassall =

New Zealand chemist (1919–2017)

Cedric Hassall FRS

Swansea University Chair of Chemistry Department
- In office 1957–1971
- Preceded by: Charles Shoppee
- Succeeded by: John Howard Purnell

Personal details
- Born: Cedric Herbert Hassall; 6 December 1919 Auckland, New Zealand
- Died: 5 September 2017 (aged 97)
- Education: Auckland University College
- Occupation: Chemist

Cedric Herbert Hassall FRS (6 December 1919 – 5 September 2017) was a New Zealand chemist.

== Life ==
Born in Auckland on 6 December 1919, Hassall was educated at Auckland Grammar School. He then studied at Auckland University College, graduating Master of Science in 1942, and took a course at Auckland Teachers' Training College. Hassall was married to Elisabeth, and had two children Peter and Maureen. Professor Hassall died on 5 September 2017.

== Career ==
=== Academic ===
After lecturing in chemistry at the University of Otago from 1942 to 1945, Hassall completed a PhD in chemistry at the University of Cambridge. In 1948 he was appointed professor of chemistry at the University of the West Indies. During his tenure, he emphasized research with local significance, studying natural products from local plants. One of his notable collaborations was with Jamaican research student Kenneth Magnus, which led to the discovery of the antibiotic Monamycin (which was named after the Mona Campus). This discovery was significant and contributed to the development of the drugs widely used in the treatment of hypertension. Hassall played a significant role in addressing the issue of Jamaican vomiting sickness, which is an acute illness caused by eating the unripe fruit of the ackee tree. He correctly identified the chemical toxin hypoglycin as the cause of the disease and helped to isolate and determine its physical structure. In 1957 he moved to the University College of Swansea to take up the post as professor and head of chemistry until 1971.

=== Industry ===
Hassall left academia to became director of Research at Roche Products Ltd in 1971. He served on the advisory board of Bee Vital.

== Honours ==
He started the Gregynog Natural Products Symposia in 1967, now known as the European Symposium on Biological and Organic Chemistry. In November 1974 Hassall was awarded on honorary Hon DSc from the UWl, Jamaica by the vice-chancellor The Hon Dr A Z Preston, and in 1986 became an Honorary Fellow of University College of Swansea. A scholarship at UWl and lecture have been named after him. He served as president of the Chemical Section of British Science Association in 1987

== Works ==
- Chemistry in the service of medicine, University College of Swansea, 1958, ISBN 978-0-901626-21-9
