= Varsity Theater =

Varsity Theater or Varsity Theatre may refer to:

- Varsity Theatre (Baton Rouge, Louisiana)
- The Blue Note (Columbia, Missouri), formerly called Varsity Theatre
- Varsity Theatre (Martin, Tennessee)
- Varsity Theater in Dinkytown, Minneapolis, Minnesota
- Varsity Theatre (Palo Alto)
- Varsity Theater (Ashland, Oregon)

== See also ==
- Varsity (disambiguation)
