= Achee =

Achee may refer to:

- Ackee, a tropical fruit from West Africa
- Yuchi, a Native American group from Oklahoma
