= SVJ =

SVJ may refer to:

- stochastic volatility jump (financial mathematics)
- Lamborghini Aventador SVJ ("Super Veloce Jota"), a supercar
- Svolvær Airport, Helle, Norway (IATA airport code: SVJ, ICAO airport code: ENSH)
- Silver Air (Djibouti) (ICAO airline code: SVJ), airline
- Sajiyavadar (rail station code: SVJ), see List of railway stations in India
- Science & Vie Junior (magazine)

== See also ==
- JSV (disambiguation)
- SJV (disambiguation)
- JVS (disambiguation)
- VJS (disambiguation)
