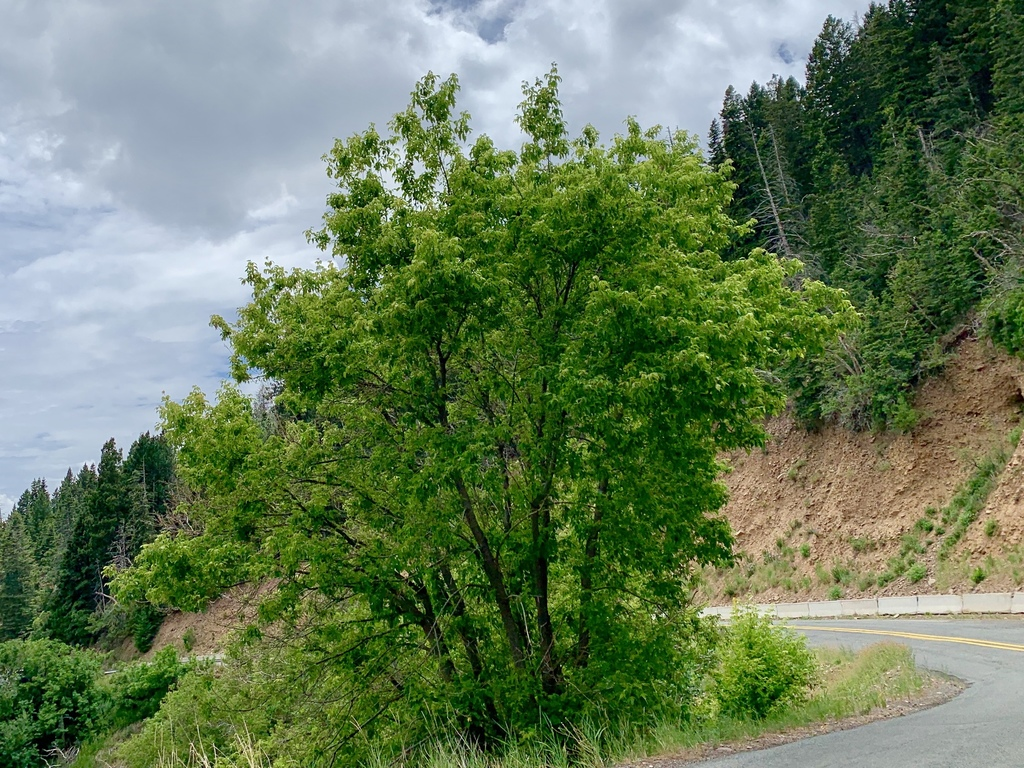

Conservation status
- Least Concern (IUCN 3.1)

Scientific classification
- Kingdom: Plantae
- Clade: Tracheophytes
- Clade: Angiosperms
- Clade: Eudicots
- Clade: Rosids
- Order: Sapindales
- Family: Sapindaceae
- Genus: Acer
- Section: Acer sect. Negundo
- Series: Acer ser. Negundo
- Species: A. negundo

Binomial name
- Acer negundo L.
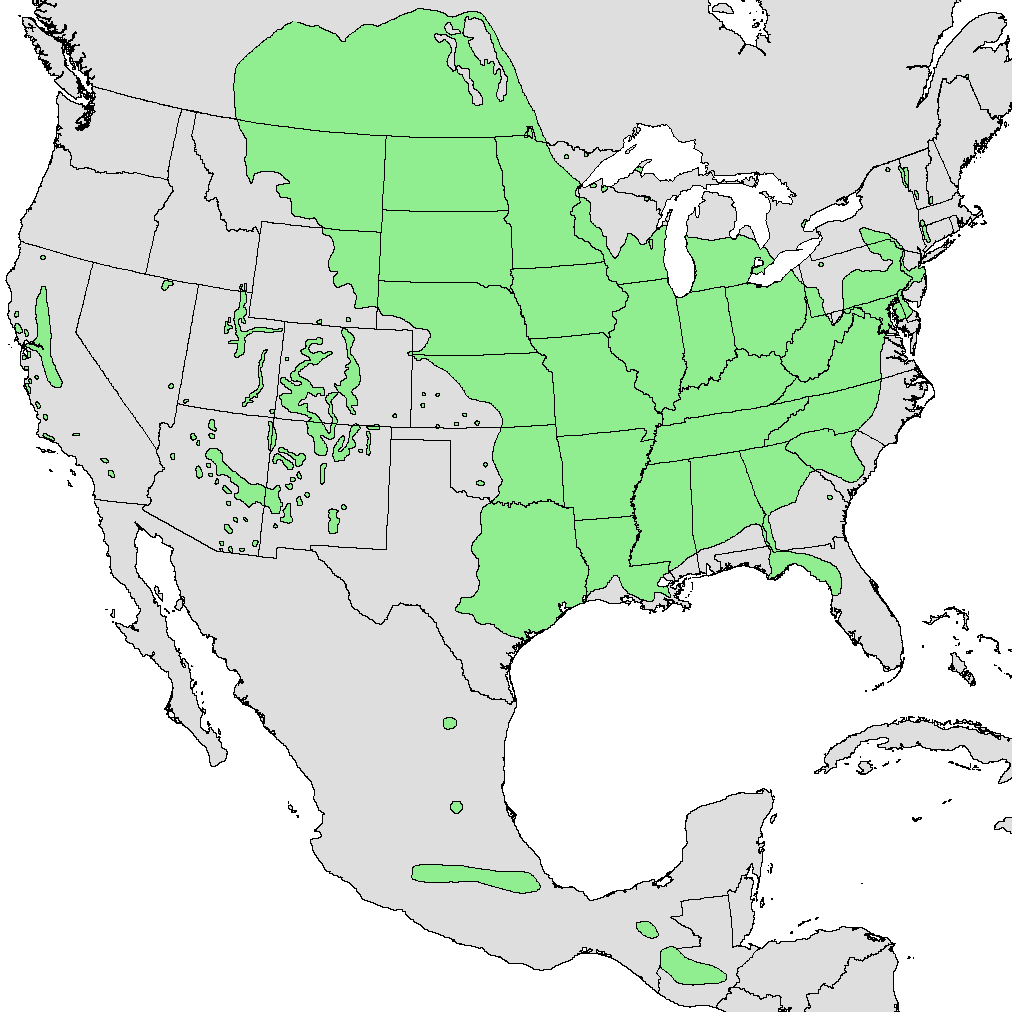
- Native range of Acer negundo

Synonyms
- List: Acer californicum var. texanum Pax; Acer fauriei H.Lév. & Vaniot; Acer fraxinifolium Nutt.; Acer fraxinifolium Raf.; Acer lobatum Raf.; Acer nuttallii (Nieuwl.) Lyon; Acer trifoliatum Raf.; Acer violaceum (Booth ex G.Kirchn.) Simonk.; Negundo aceroides var. violaceum G. Kirchn.; Negundo aceroides subsp. violaceus (Booth ex G. Kirchn.) W.A. Weber; Negundo fraxinifolium var. crispum Loudon; Negundo fraxinifolium var. violaceum Booth ex Loudon; Negundo negundo (L.) H. Karst.; Negundo texanum (Pax) Rydb.; Rulac negundo (L.) Hitchc.

= Acer negundo =

Species of maple

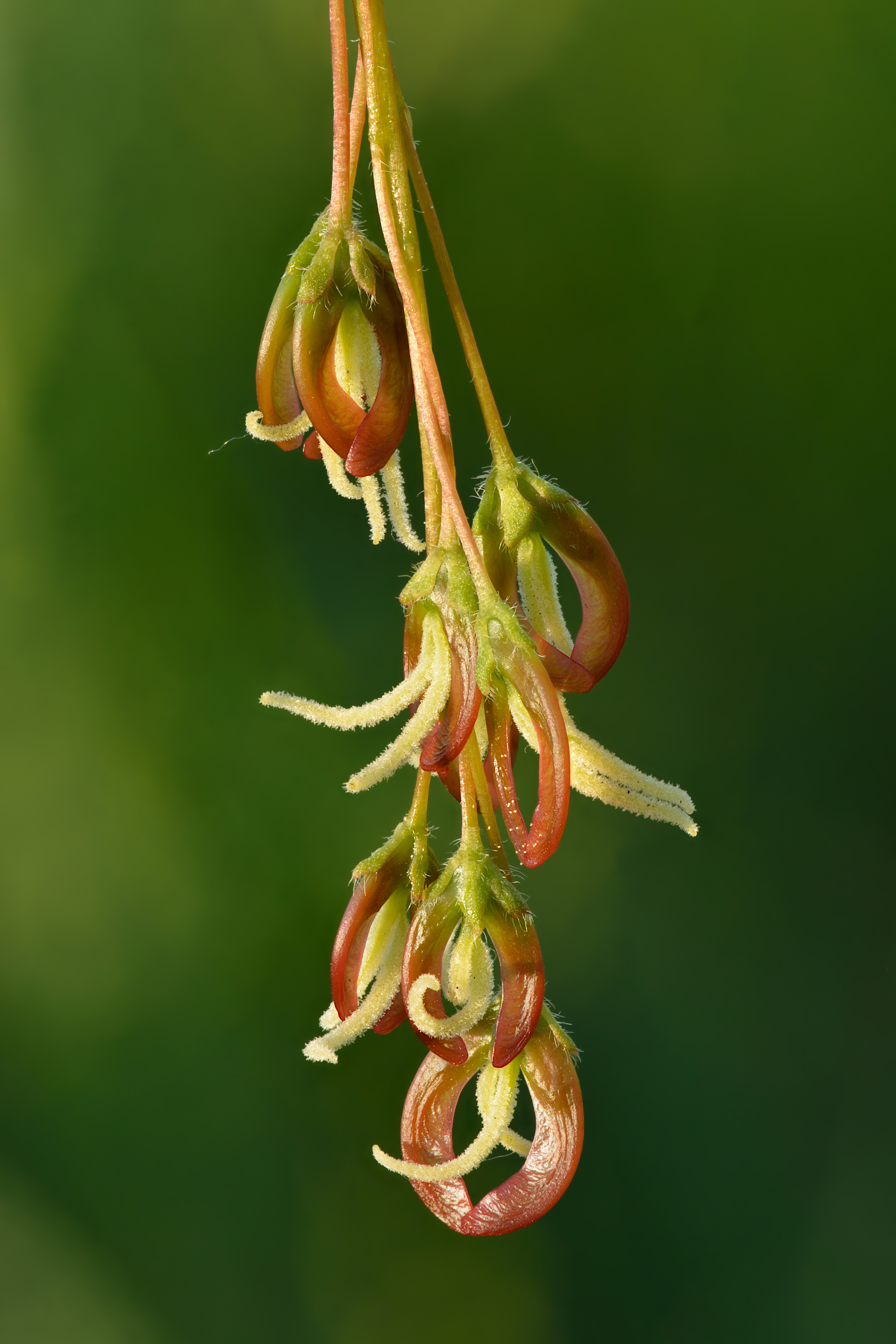
Female flowers

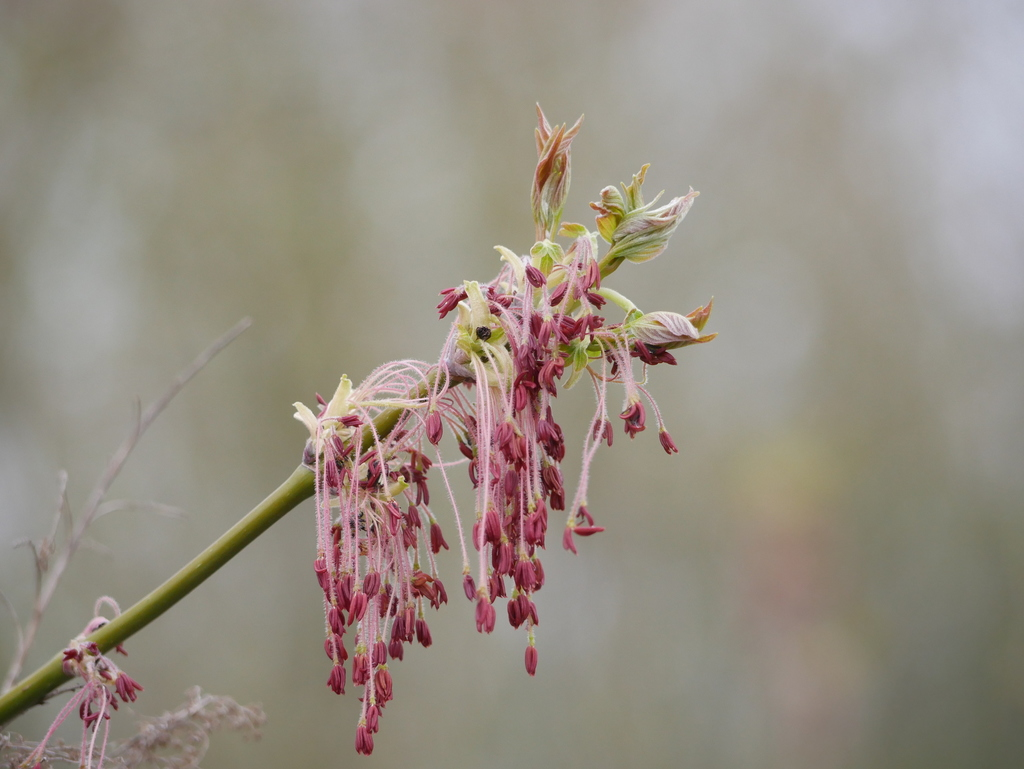
Male flowers

Acer negundo, also known as the box elder, boxelder maple, Manitoba maple or ash-leaved maple, is a species of maple native to North America from Canada to Honduras. It is a fast-growing, short-lived tree with opposite, ash-like compound leaves. It is sometimes considered a weedy or invasive species, and has been naturalized throughout much of the world, including South America, Australia, New Zealand, South Africa, and Eurasia.

== Description ==
Acer negundo is a fast-growing and fairly short-lived tree that grows up to 10–25 m (35–80 ft) tall, with a trunk diameter of 30–50 cm (12–20 in), rarely up to 1 m (3 ft 3 in) diameter. It often has several trunks and can form impenetrable thickets. The typical lifespan of box elder is 60–75 years. Under exceptionally favorable conditions, it may live to 100 years.

The shoots are green, often with a whitish to pink or violet waxy coating when young. Branches are smooth, somewhat brittle, and tend to retain a fresh green color rather than forming a bark of dead, protective tissue. The bark on its trunks is pale gray or light brown, deeply cleft into broad ridges, and scaly.

Unlike most other maples (which usually have simple, palmately lobed leaves), Acer negundo has pinnately compound leaves that usually have three to seven leaflets. Simple leaves are also occasionally present; technically, these are single-leaflet compound leaves. Although some other maples (such as Acer griseum, Acer mandshuricum and the closely related A. cissifolium) have trifoliate leaves, only A. negundo regularly displays more than three leaflets. The leaflets are about 5–10 cm (2–4 in) long and 3–7 cm (1 1/4–2 3/4 in) wide with slightly serrate margins. Leaves have a translucent light green color and turn yellow in the fall.

The yellow-green flowers are small and appear in early spring, with staminate flowers in clusters on slender pedicels and pistillate flowers on drooping racemes 10–20 cm (4–8 in) long.

The fruit is a schizocarp of two single-seeded, winged samaras on drooping racemes. Each seed is slender, 1–2 cm (1/2–3/4 in) long, with a 2–3 cm (3/4–1 1/4 in) incurved wing; they drop in autumn or they may persist through winter. Seeds are usually both prolific and fertile.

Unlike most other maples, A. negundo is fully dioecious and both a male and female tree are needed for reproduction to occur. The male and female flowers appear on separate plants, with males featuring clusters that generally have four flowers together, while females appear as a raceme.

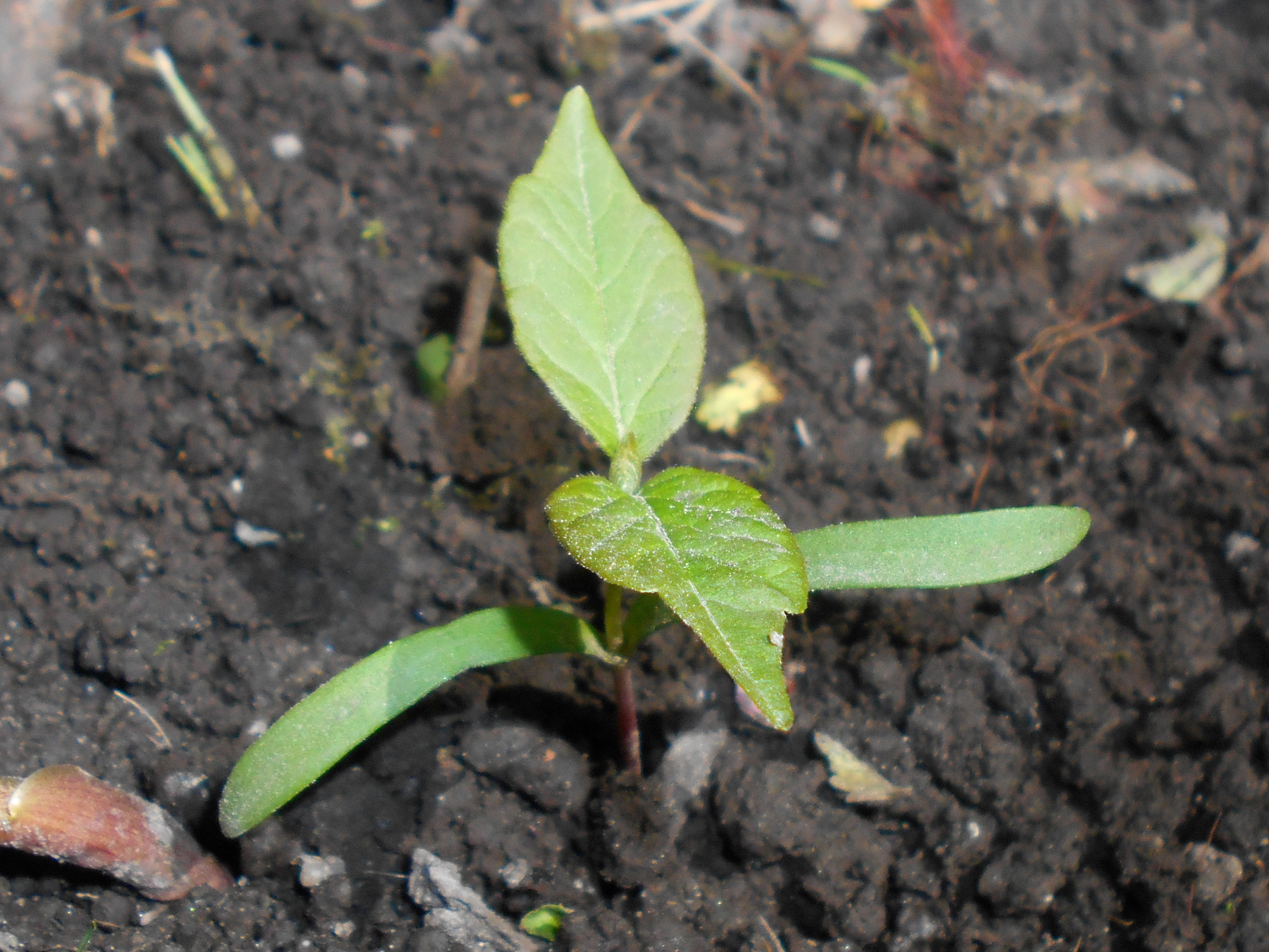
Seedling

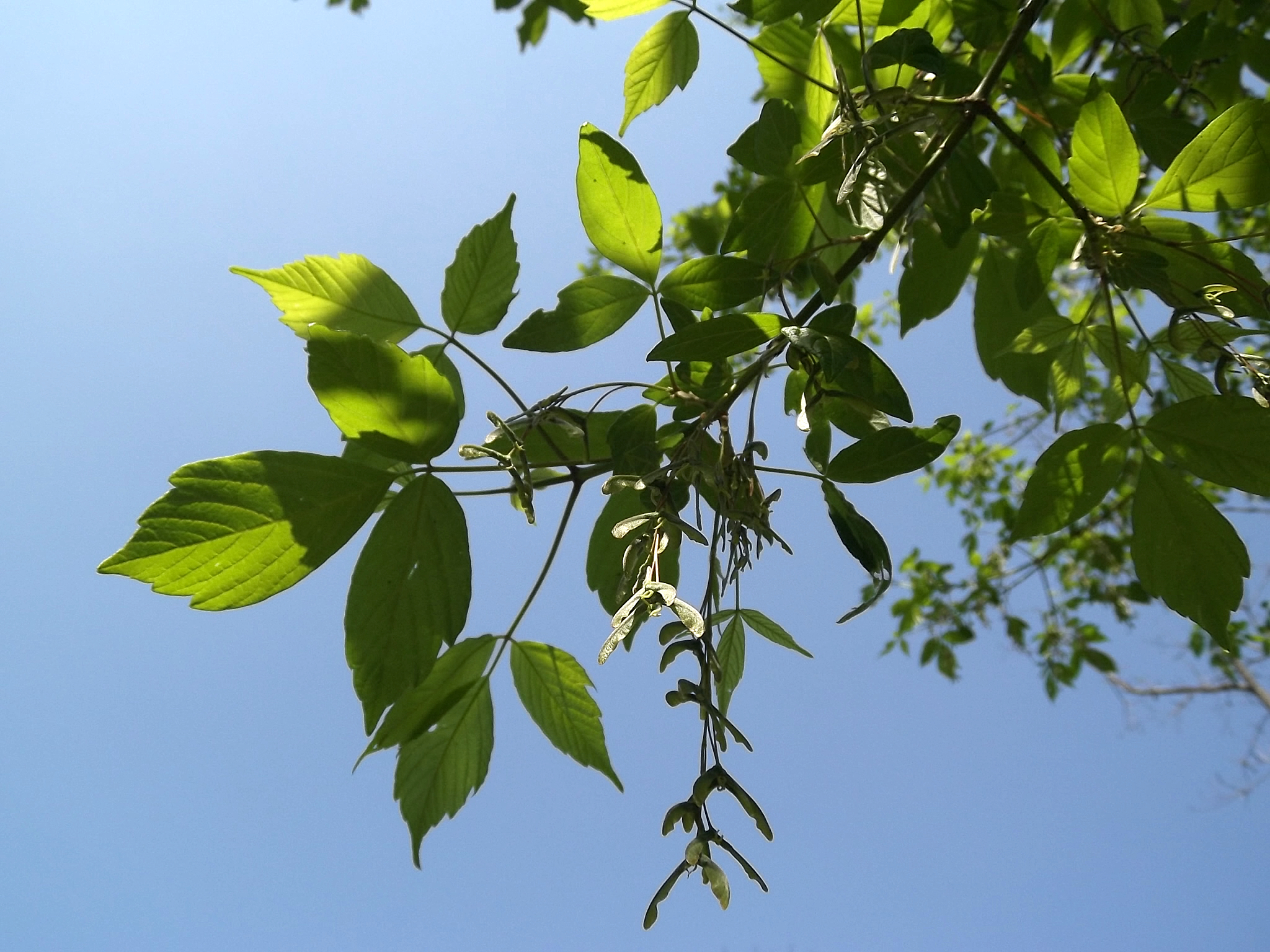
Leaves and fruit

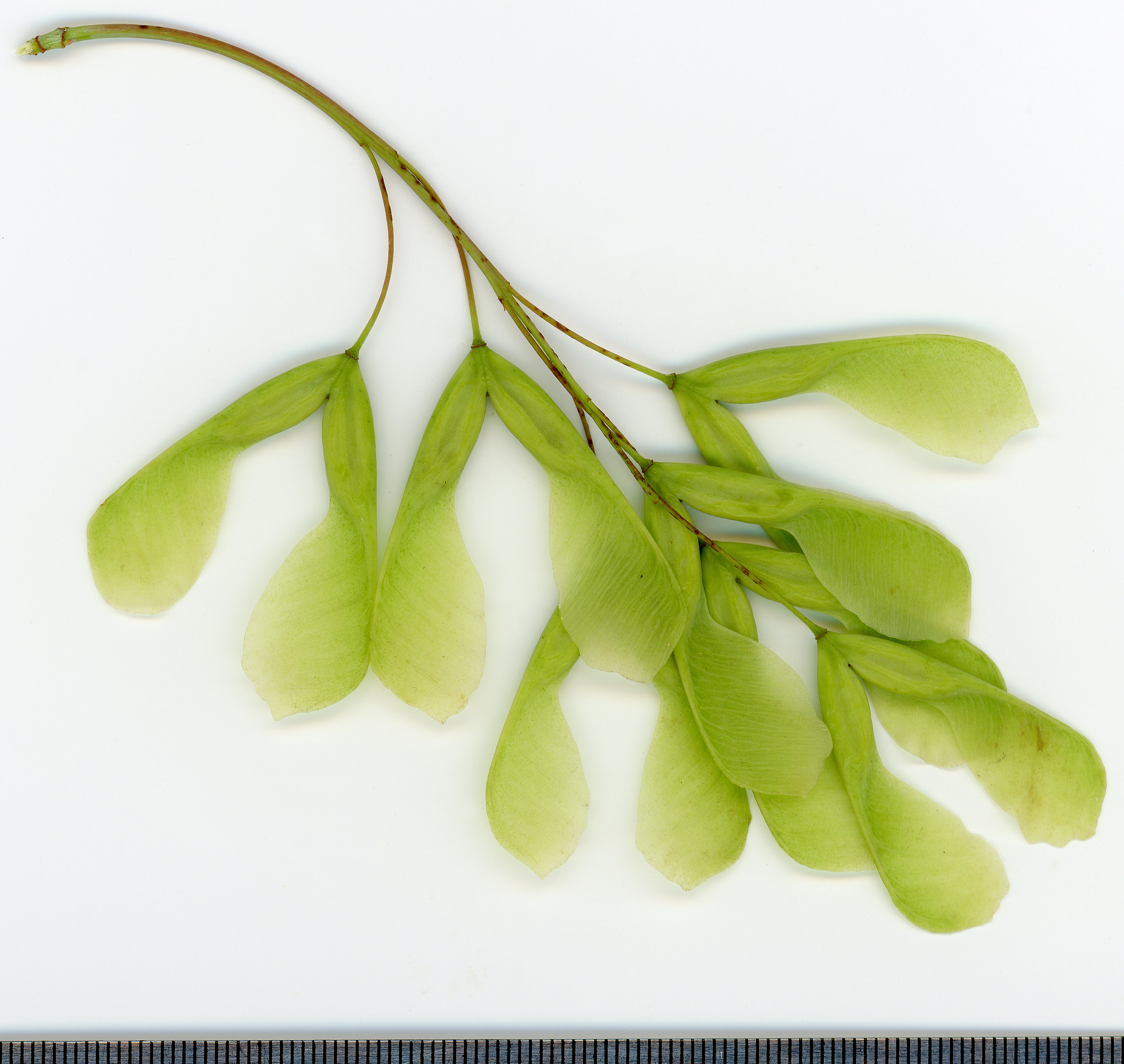
Fruit

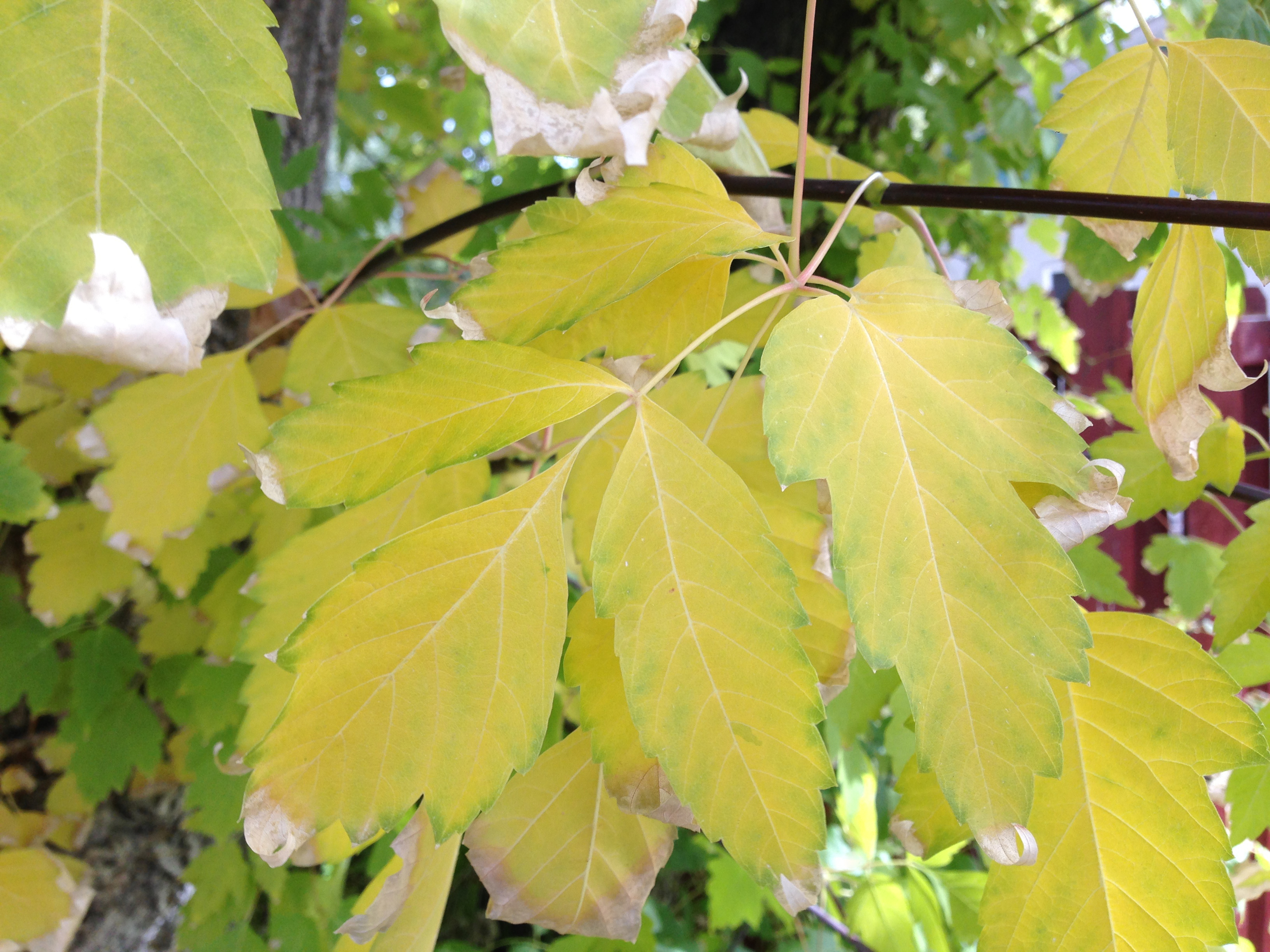
Autumn leaf color

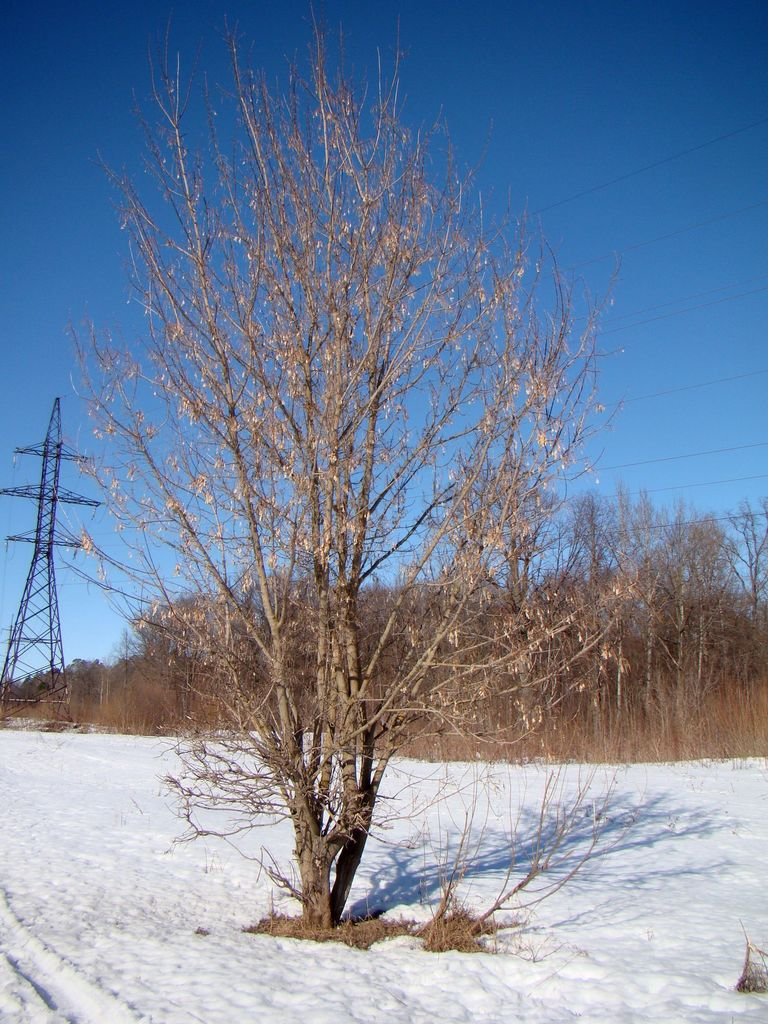
Retained seeds in winter

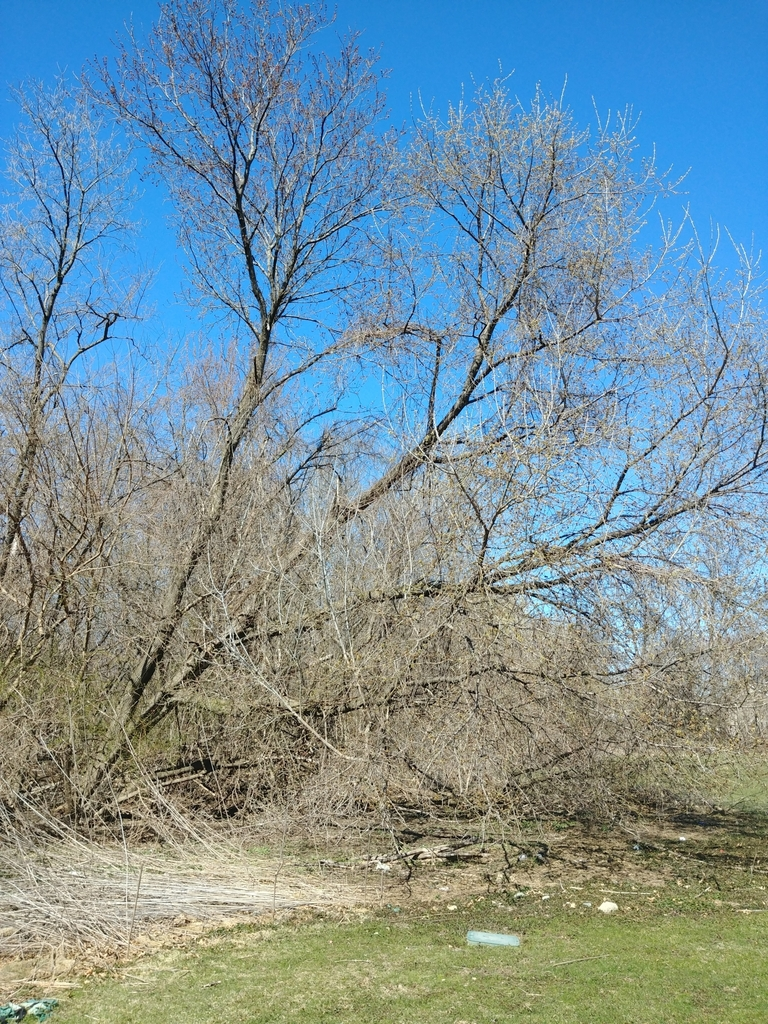
Sprawling, multi-stemmed growth form

== Taxonomy ==
A few botanists treat boxelder maple in its own distinct genus (Negundo aceroides) but this is not widely accepted.

=== Subspecies ===
Acer negundo is often divided into three or more subspecies, some of which were originally described as separate species. These are:

- Acer negundo subsp. negundo, native from the Atlantic Coast to the Rocky Mountains.
- Acer negundo subsp. interior (Britton) Sarg., with more leaf serration than the nominate subspecies and a more matte leaf surface, is native from Saskatchewan to New Mexico, between the eastern and western subspecies.
- Acer negundo var. arizonicum Sarg. is native to Arizona, New Mexico, and northern Mexico.
- Acer negundo subsp. californicum (Torr. & A.Gray) Sarg., with larger leaves with a velvety texture, is found in parts of California.
- Acer negundo subsp. mexicanum (DC.) Wesm. is native to Mexico, Guatemala, and Honduras.
- Acer negundo var. texanum Pax is native to the southern United States from Virginia to New Mexico, and to northeastern Mexico.
- Acer negundo var. violaceum (Booth ex Loudon) H.Jaeger is native to the Northeastern coastal US and to the northern interior US from the Ohio Valley to the Columbia River basin.

Some authors further subdivide A. negundo subsp. negundo into a number of regional varieties but these intergrade and their maintenance as distinct taxa is disputed by many. Even the differences between recognized subspecies are probably a matter of gradient speciation.

=== Common names ===
Indicative of its familiarity to many people over a large geographic range, A. negundo has numerous common names. The names "box elder" and "boxelder maple" are based upon the similarity of its whitish wood to that of boxwood and the similarity of its pinnately compound leaves to those of some species of elder.

Other common names are based upon this maple's similarity to ash, its preferred environment, its sugary sap, a description of its leaves, its binomial name, and so on. These names include "Manitoba maple", "ash-leaf maple", "cut-leaved maple", "three-leaf maple", "ash maple", "sugar maple", "negundo maple", and "river maple".

Names vary regionally. Box elder, boxelder maple, ash-leaved maple, and maple ash are among its common names in the US. In Canada it is commonly known as Manitoba maple and occasionally as elf maple. In the British Isles it is known as box elder or ashleaf maple. In Russia it is known as American maple (Russian: америка́нский клён, romanized: amerikansky klyon) as well as ash-leaf maple (Russian: клён ясенели́стный, romanized: klyon yasenelistny).

Because of its leaflets' superficial similarity to those of poison ivy, Acer negundo saplings are often mistaken for the allergenic plant. While both poison ivy and Acer negundo have compound leaves composed of three leaflets with ragged edges, Acer negundo exhibits an opposite branching pattern, as opposed to the alternating pattern of poison ivy. Like poison ivy, Acer negundo is also a noted riparian species, and can often be found growing along riverbeds and in wet soils generally. For all these reasons, and despite their obvious differences, Acer negundo is sometimes referred to informally as the poison ivy tree.

== Distribution and habitat ==
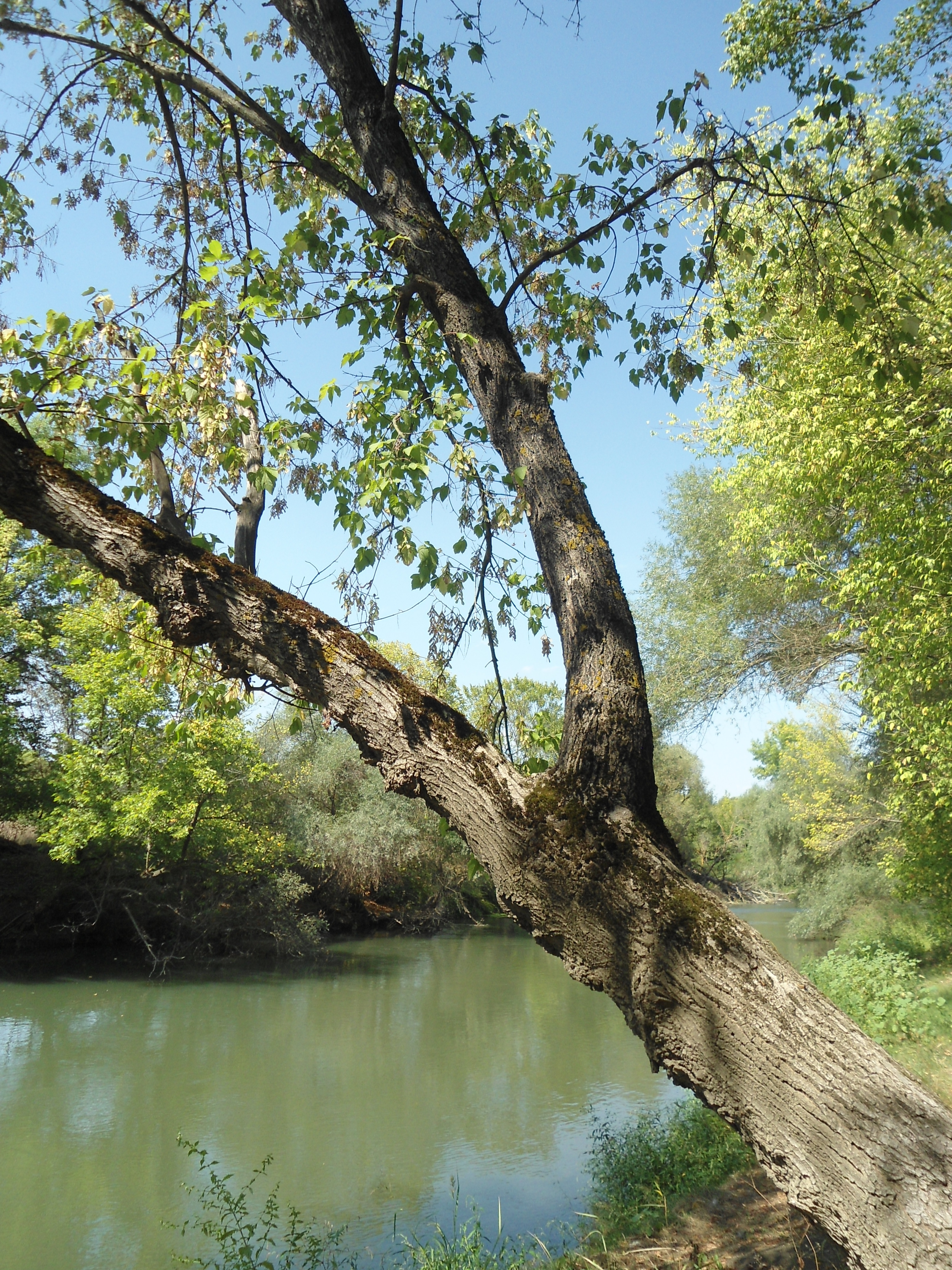
Acer negundo often grows alongside waterbodies.

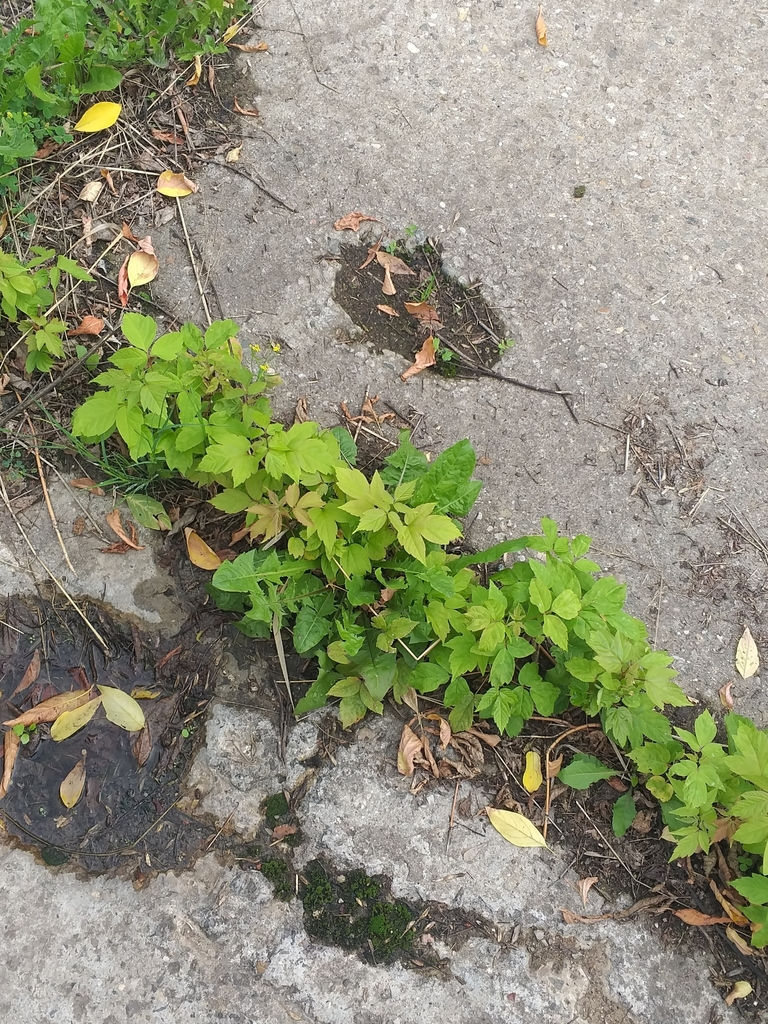
Growing as a weed in pavement crack in Russia

Acer negundo is native across much of the US (mostly in the east) and south-central Canada, and can be found as far south as Guatemala and Honduras. It has also been naturalized throughout much of the world, including South America, Australia, New Zealand, South Africa, much of Europe, and parts of Asia.

Although native to North America, it is considered a weedy species in some areas, such as in parts of the Northeastern US, and has increased greatly in these areas. In 1928, Joseph Illick, chief forester for the state of Pennsylvania, wrote in Pennsylvania Trees that box elder was "rare and localized" in the state. After World War II, box elder's rapid growth made it a popular landscaping tree in suburban housing developments despite its poor form, vulnerability to storm damage, and tendency to attract large numbers of box elder bugs. Intentional cultivation has thus made the tree far more abundant than it once was.

It can quickly colonize both cultivated and uncultivated areas and the range is therefore expanding both in North America and elsewhere. In Europe where it was introduced in 1688 as a park tree it is able to spread quickly and is considered an invasive species in parts of Central Europe, including Germany, the Czech Republic, Hungary, Slovenia, Poland and Russia where it can form mass growth in lowlands, disturbed areas, and riparian biomes on calcareous soils. It has also become naturalized in eastern China, is listed as a pest invasive species in some of the cooler areas of the Australian continent, and is invasive in the Río de la Plata area.

This species prefers bright sunlight. It often grows on flood plains and other disturbed areas with ample water supply, such as riparian zones. Human influence has greatly favored this species; it grows around houses and in hedges, as well as on disturbed ground and vacant lots.

== Ecology ==
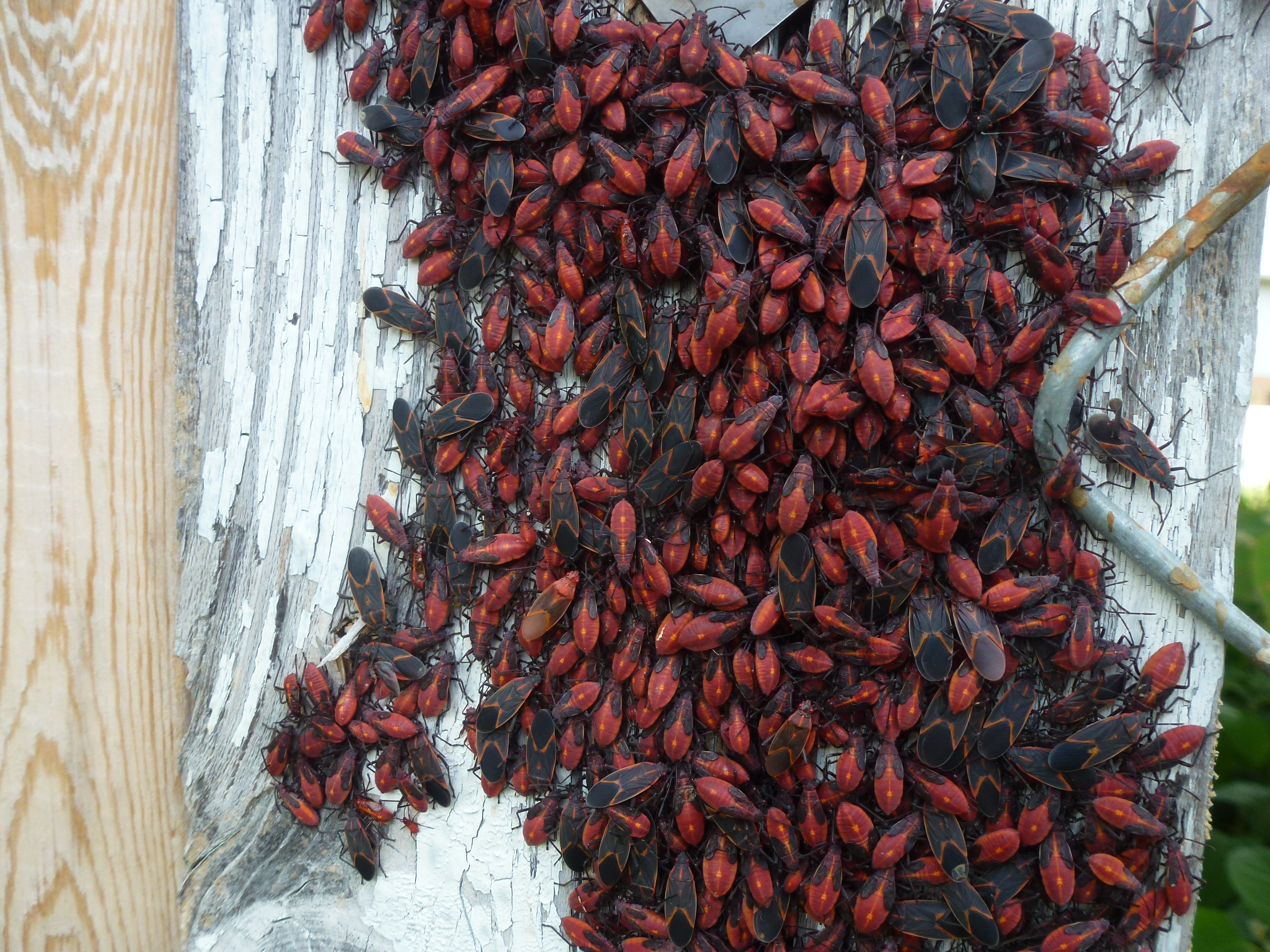
Boxelder bugs (Boisea trivittata) feed on Acer negundo

Several birds and some squirrels feed on the seeds. The evening grosbeak uses them extensively.

The boxelder bug (Boisea trivittata) lays its eggs on all maples, but prefers this species, clustering the eggs in bark crevices. The rosy maple moth (Dryocampa rubicunda) also lays its eggs on the leaves of maple trees, including Acer negundo. The larvae feed on the leaves, and in very dense populations can cause defoliation.

Small galls are formed on the leaves by a bladder mite, Aceria negundi. A gall midge, Contarinia negundinis joins and enlarges the galls of Aceria negundi. The midge sometimes creates a separate, tubular gall on the midrib or veins of the undersides of the leaves.

The cottony maple leaf scale, Pulvinaria acericola, occurs on the foliage of Acer negundo. A leaf spot fungus, Septoria negundinis creates black-ringed lesions on the leaves.

== Cultivation ==
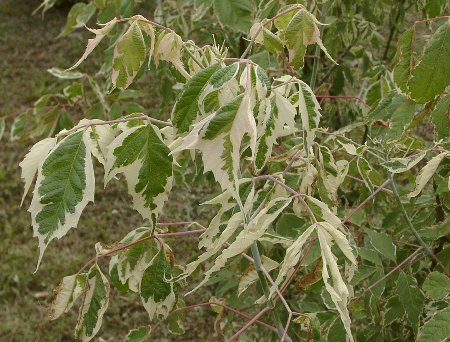
'Variegatum' cultivar with white-margined leaves

Although its weak wood, irregular form, and prolific seeding might make it seem like a poor choice for a landscape tree, A. negundo is one of the most common maples in cultivation. Long-term success has been noted as far north as Yellowknife. Many cultivars have been developed, such as:

- Auratum: yellowish leaves with smooth undersides
- Aureomarginatum: creamy yellow leaf margins
- Baron: Hardier & seedless variety
- Elegans: distinctively convex leaves
- Flamingo: pink and white variegation (very popular)
- Pendulum: with weeping branches
- Variegatum: creamy white leaf margins
- Violaceum: younger shoots and branches have bluish color

== Toxicity ==
A protoxin present in the seeds of Acer negundo, hypoglycin A, has been identified as a major risk factor for, and possibly the cause of, a disease in horses, seasonal pasture myopathy (SPM). SPM is an equine neurological disease which occurs seasonally in certain areas of North America and Europe, with symptoms including stiffness, difficulty walking or standing, dark urine and eventually breathing rapidly and becoming recumbent. Ingestion of sufficient quantities of box elder seeds or other parts of the plant results in breakdown of respiratory, postural, and cardiac muscles. The cause of SPM was unknown for centuries despite the disease being well known among affected areas and was only positively determined in the 21st century. It is analogous to Jamaican vomiting sickness in humans, also caused by hypoglycin A.

Acer negundo pollen, which is released in winter or spring (varying with latitude and elevation) is a severe allergen.

== Uses ==
=== Wood ===
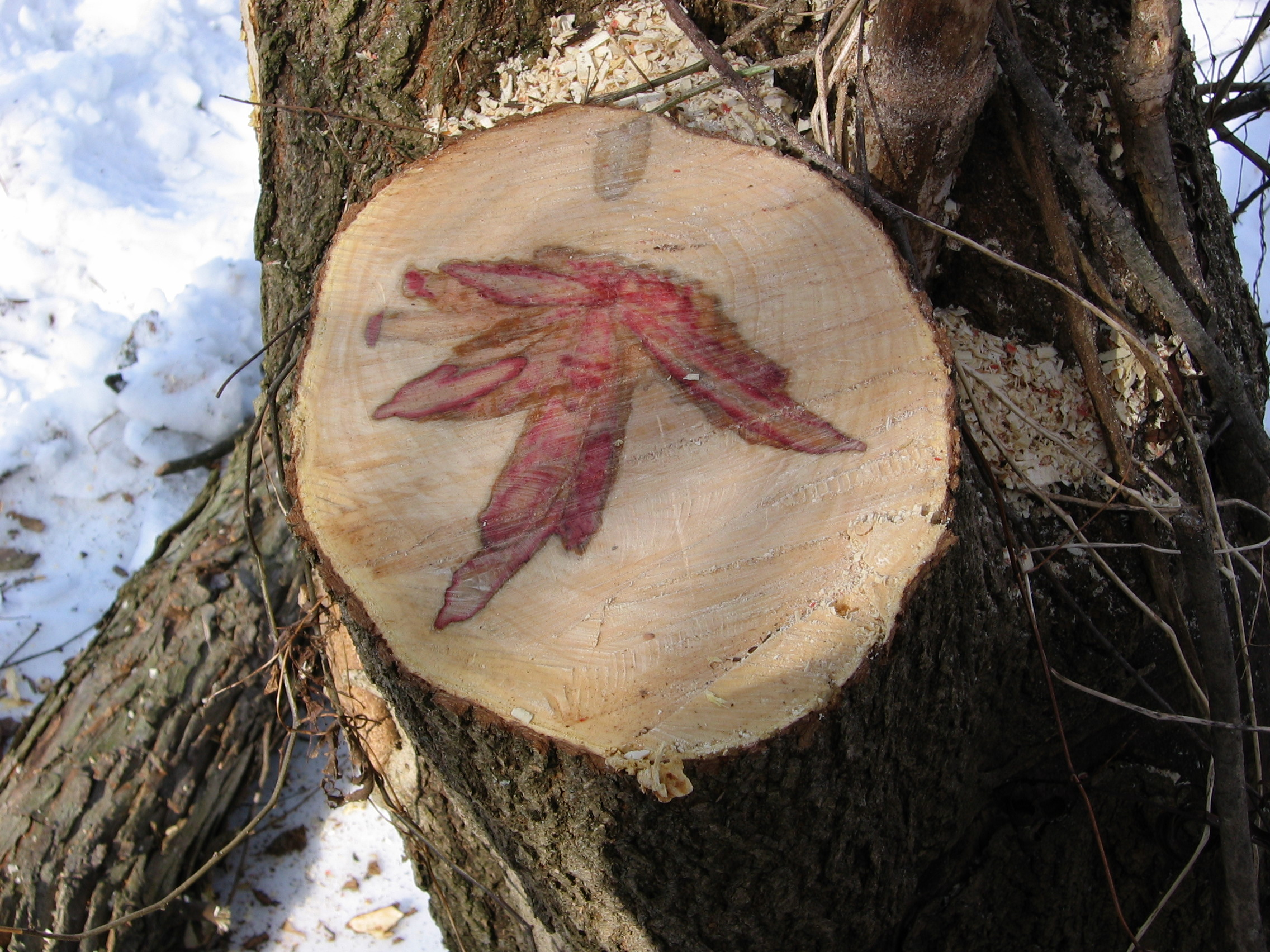
Heartwood of Acer negundo with red stain

Although its light, close-grained, soft wood is considered undesirable for most commercial uses, this tree has been considered as a source of wood fiber, for use in fiberboard. There is also some commercial use of the tree for various decorative applications, such as turned items (bowls, stem-ware, pens). Such purposes generally use burl or injured wood, as the injured wood develops a red stain.

The wood has been used for a variety of purposes by Native Americans, such as by the Navajo to make tubes for bellows, by the Cheyenne to make bowls, and by the native peoples of Montana who use the large trunk burls or knots to make bowls, dishes, drums, and pipe stems. The Tewa use the twigs as pipe stems and the Keres make the twigs into prayer sticks.

The Dakota people and the Omaha people make the wood into charcoal, which is used in ceremonial painting and tattooing. The Kiowa burn the wood in the altar fire during the peyote ceremony.

Acer negundo was identified as the material used in the oldest extant wood flutes from the Americas. The flutes, excavated by Earl H. Morris in 1931 in Northeastern Arizona, have been dated to 620–670 CE.

=== Medicinal use ===
Acer negundo has been used by Native Americans for several medicinal purposes. The Cheyenne burn the wood as incense for making spiritual medicines, and during Sun Dance ceremonies. The Meskwaki use a decoction of the inner bark as an emetic, and the Ojibwe use an infusion of the inner bark for the same purpose.

=== As food ===
The sap has been used to make syrup by Native Americans, including the Dakota, Omaha, Pawnee, Ponca, Winnebago, Cree, Sioux, and the indigenous people of Montana. The Chiricahua and Mescalero Apache dry scrapings of the inner bark and keep it as winter food, and they also boil the inner bark until sugar crystallizes out of it. The Cheyenne mix the boiled sap with shavings from the inner sides of animal hides and eat them as candy. The Ojibwe mix the sap with that of the sugar maple and drink it as a beverage.

== In culture ==
Box Elder County, Utah is named for this tree, as is the town of Box Elder, South Dakota.
