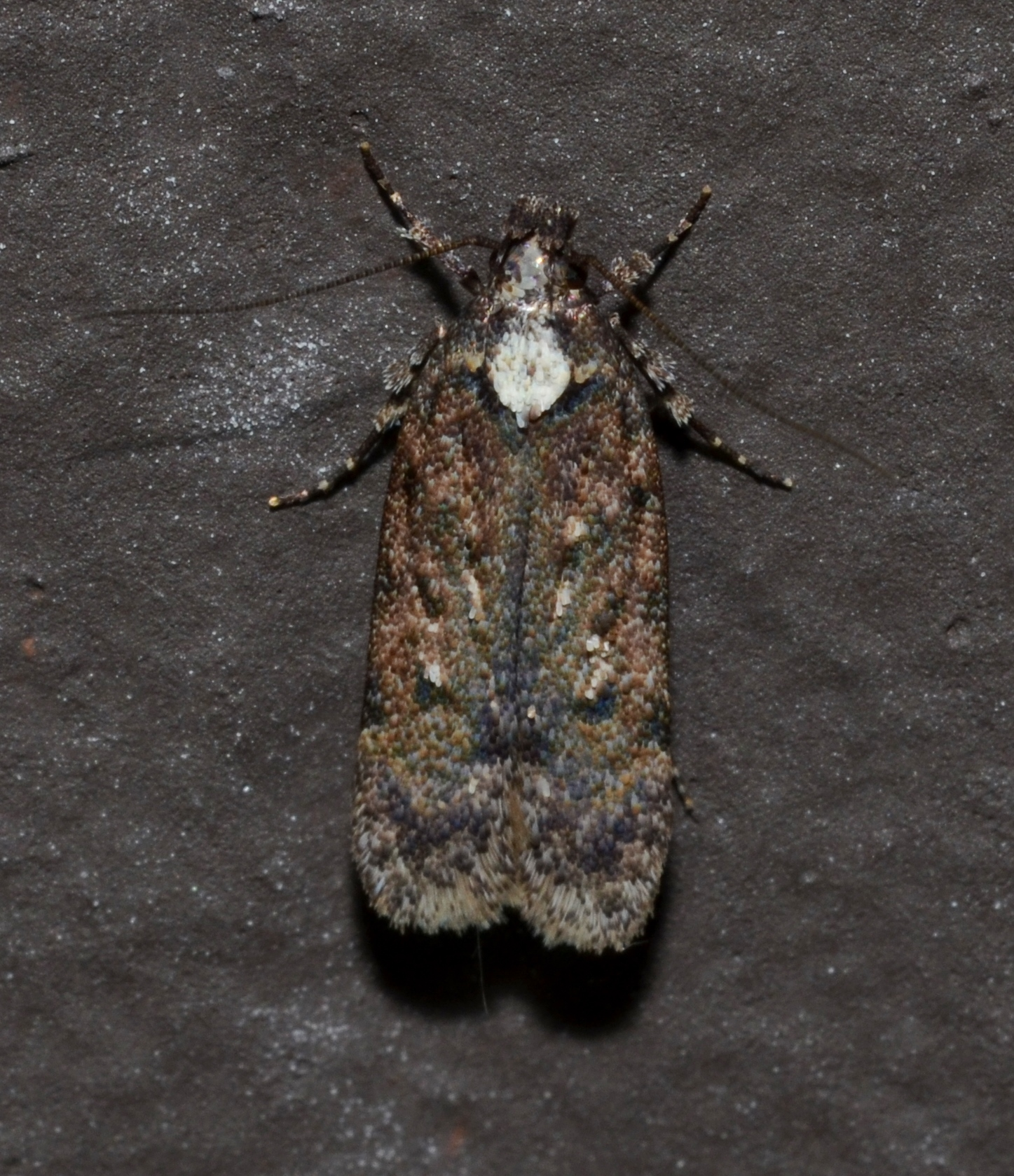

Scientific classification
- Kingdom: Animalia
- Phylum: Arthropoda
- Clade: Pancrustacea
- Class: Insecta
- Order: Lepidoptera
- Family: Gelechiidae
- Genus: Chionodes
- Species: C. obscurusella

Binomial name
- Chionodes obscurusella (Chambers, 1872)

Synonyms
- Depressaria obscurusella Chambers, 1872; Gelechia fuscopulvella Chambers, 1872; Gelechia obscurella Walsingham, 1903; Gelechia negundella Heinrich, 1920; Chionodes asema Clarke, 1947

= Chionodes obscurusella =

Species of moth

Chionodes obscurusella, the boxelder leafworm moth, is a moth in the family Gelechiidae. It is found in North America, where it has been recorded from Nova Scotia to Manitoba, south to North Carolina and Oklahoma.

The wingspan is about 12 mm. The forewings are dull ochreous fuscous spotted with black, with a small black sub-costal dot at the base of the wing. There is a small black dash from the basal third of the costa, below and beyond this and occupying about the middle of the cell is a broad ill-defined patch of blackish scales. There is a more or less obscure shading of black scales on the middle of the costa, as well as a black dash just before the apical third of the costa, and below it, extending to the dorsum, an irregular, ill-defined black line. A faint dusting of black scales is found near the outer margin of the wing. The hindwings are very pale, semi-transparent whitish-fuscous.

The larvae are leaf-tiers on Acer negundo and Acer saccharum.
