= JSV =

JSV may refer to:

- Jewish Socialist Verband, an American political party
- Journal of Sound and Vibration
- Sallisaw Municipal Airport, in Oklahoma, United States
- Juan Sebastián Verón (born 1975), Argentine footballer

== See also ==
- JVS (disambiguation)
- SVJ (disambiguation)
- SJV (disambiguation)
- VJS (disambiguation)
