= VJS =

VJS may refer to:

- J Sharp
- Vishwa Jain Sangathan, a religious and social service organization in India
- Vijay Sethupathi, an Indian actor

== See also ==
- VJ (disambiguation)
- JVS (disambiguation)
- JSV (disambiguation)
- SVJ (disambiguation)
- SJV (disambiguation)
