= VJ =

VJ may refer to

== Arts and media ==
- Video jockey, a television announcer who introduces and plays videos
- VJing, a live visual performance art practice
- Vee-Jay Records, an American blues and jazz record label
- Video journalism
- Video joker, a translator and commentator at movie theaters in Uganda
- Viewtiful Joe, a video game series by Capcom
- VJayBombs, a satirical political commentary social media account

== People ==
- Van Jacobson (born 1950), American computer scientist
- Vickie Johnson (born 1972), American basketball player
- Reginald VelJohnson (born 1952), American actor
- Victoria Justice (born 1993), an American actress, singer, songwriter and dancer.
- VJ Payne (born 2004), American football player
- V. J. Edgecombe (born 2005), Bahamian basketball player

== Science and technology ==
- V(D)J recombination, a mechanism of genetic recombination
- Visual J Sharp, or Visual J#, a programming language

== Other uses ==
- Victory over Japan Day, V-J Day
- Vojska Jugoslavije, the military of Serbia and Montenegro from 1992 to 2003
- Willys-Overland Jeepster, an automobile produced 1948–1950
- VietJet Air (code VJ)
- VJ Patterson, a fictional character in the Australian television soap opera Home and Away
- Military of Serbia and Montenegro, abbreviated "VJ" in Serbo-Croatian

== See also ==
- All pages containing "vj"
- VJS (disambiguation)
- Veejay (disambiguation)
- Vijay (disambiguation)
- V (disambiguation)
- J (disambiguation)
- JV (disambiguation)
