= Operation Vijay =

Operation Vijay (lit. 'Operation Victory') may refer to:

- Operation Vijay (1961), the operation by the Indian Armed Forces that led to the liberation of Goa, Daman and Diu and Anjediva Islands from the Portuguese
- Operation Vijay (1999), the Indian Armed Forces operation to flush out Pakistani Army and paramilitary infiltrations along the LOC during the Kargil War
  - Operation Vijay Star, Indian military decoration
  - Operation Vijay Medal, Indian military decoration
  - Kargil Vijay Diwas, celebrated on 26 July in India in commemoration of the Kargil War

== See also ==
- Vijay (disambiguation)
- Vijay Diwas (disambiguation)
