= Vijay (name) =

Vijay (Sanskrit: विजय, Bengali: বিজয়) is a Hindu male given name meaning 'Victory', and also a surname.

== Surname ==
Notable people with the name include:

- A. L. Vijay (born 1979), Indian film director
- Duniya Vijay (born 1974), Kannada actor
- Karishma Vijay (born 1997), English businesswoman
- Murali Vijay (born 1984), Indian cricketer
- Sanchari Vijay, national award winner Kannada actor

== Given name ==
=== Academics ===
- Vijay Bhargava (born 1948), Professor of Electrical and Computer Engineering, University of British Columbia
- Vijay Prashad, Indian historian, journalist and political commentator
- Vijay S. Pande (born 1970), Associate Professor of Chemistry and Structural biology, Stanford University
- Vijaipal Singh (born 1945), scientist associated with the Indian Council of Agricultural Research

=== Armed Forces ===
- Vijay Lall, Lt General, Indian Army (born 1942)

=== Film ===
- Vijay (actor) (born 1974), Indian film actor and playback singer
- Vijay (director), Kannada film director
- Vijay Anand (filmmaker) (1925–2004), Hindi film producer, director, writer and actor
- Vijay Deverakonda (born 1985), Indian Telugu film actor and producer
- Vijay Kumar (filmmaker), debuted with Uriyadi
- Vijay Sethupathi (born 1978), Indian film actor and producer
- Vijay Varma (born 1986), Indian film actor
- Vijay Raaz (born 1963), Indian film actor

=== Music ===
- Vijay Antony (born 1975), Indian music director
- Krish (singer), Vijay "Krish" Balakrishnan (born 1977), Indian singer
- Vijay Iyer (born 1971), American jazz pianist
- Vijay Kichlu (1930-2023), Hindustani singer
- Vijay Madhavan, Indian classical dancer
- Vijay Patil, known as Raamlaxman, Indian pianist and accordionist
- Vijay Prakash (born 1976), Indian singer
- Vijay Yesudas (born 1979), Indian singer

=== Politics ===
- C. Joseph Vijay (born 1974), Indian politician and former actor, incumbent Chief Minister of Tamil Nadu
- Vijay Anand (politician) (born 1969), Tamil Nadu State politician
- Vijay Jolly (born 1960), BJP politician
- Vijay Mallya (born 1955), Indian businessman and Member of Parliament

=== Sports ===
- Vijay Amritraj (born 1953), former Indian tennis player
- Vijay Bharadwaj (born 1975), Indian cricketer
- Vijay Dahiya (born 1973), Indian cricketer
- Vijay Hazare (1915–2004), captain of the Indian cricket team
- Vijay Kumar (sport shooter) (born 1985), Indian professional shooter
- Vijay Manjrekar (1931–1983), Indian cricketer
- Vijay Mehra (Emirati cricketer) (born 1963), UAE cricketer
- Vijay Mehra (Indian cricketer) (1938–2006), Indian cricketer
- Vijay Merchant (1911–1987), Indian cricketer
- Vijay Pal Singh (born 1967), Indian pole vaulter
- Vijay Rajindernath (1928–1989), Indian cricketer
- Vijay Singh (born 1963), Fijian-Indian golfer

=== Other ===
- Vijay Barse (born 1945), social worker from Nagpur

== See also ==
- Vijay (disambiguation)
- Vijaya (disambiguation), alternative transliteration or female equivalent of Vijay
- Vijayan (stunt coordinator), Indian action choreographer
- Wijay (born 1982), Indonesian international footballer of Indian descent
