= Toxication =

Biological process of increasing toxicity

Toxication, toxification or toxicity exaltation is the conversion of a chemical compound into a more toxic form in living organisms or in substrates such as soil or water. The conversion can be caused by enzymatic metabolism in the organisms, as well as by abiotic chemical reactions. While the parent drug is usually less active, both the parent drug and its metabolite can be chemically active and cause toxicity. Different classes of enzymes, such as P450 monooxygenases, epoxide hydrolase, or acetyltransferases can catalyze the process in the cell, mostly in the liver.

Parent non-toxic chemicals are generally referred to as protoxins. While toxication is generally undesirable, in certain cases it is required for the in vivo conversion of a prodrug to a metabolite with desired pharmacological or toxicological activity. Codeine is an example of a prodrug, metabolized in the body to the active compounds morphine and codeine-6-glucuronide.

== Toxication by enzymatic metabolism ==
=== CYP450 enzymes ===
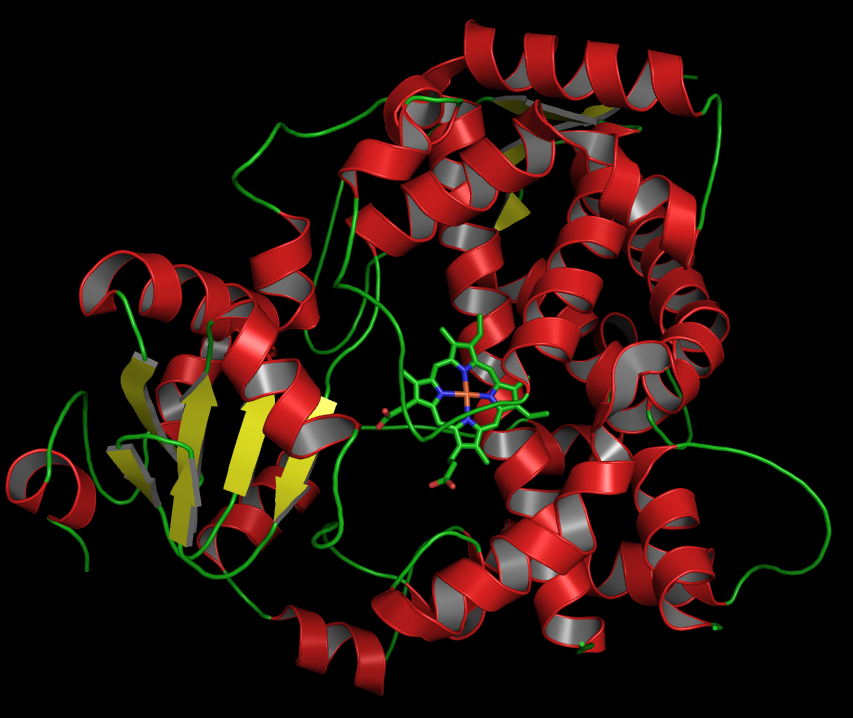
Enzyme CYP3A4, in CYP3A subfamily, contributes to hepatotoxicity during metabolism.

Phase I of drug metabolism are bioactivation pathways, which are catalyzed by CYP450 enzymes, produce toxic metabolites and thus have the potential to damage cells. The unusual level of activity CYP450 enzymes might lead to the changes in drug metabolism and convert drugs into their more toxic forms. Among Phase I CYP450 enzymes, the subfamilies CYP2D6 and CYP3A are responsible for hepatotoxicity during drug metabolism with a number of different drugs, including flucloxacillin, troleandomycin, and troglitazone. Hepatotoxicity indicates the drug's toxicity to liver.

Paracetamol (acetaminophen, APAP) is converted into the hepatotoxic metabolite NAPQI via the cytochrome P450 oxidase system, mainly by the subfamily CYP2E1. Hepatic reduced glutathione (GSH) will detoxify this formed NAPQI quickly if APAP is taken at a proper level. In the case of overdoses, the storage of GSH will not be enough for NAPQI detoxication, thereby resulting in acute liver injury.

=== Other oxidoreductases ===
Oxidoreductases are enzymes that catalyze the reactions that involve the transfer of electrons. Methanol in itself is toxic due to its central nervous system depression properties, but it can be converted to formaldehyde by alcohol dehydrogenase and then converted to formic acid by aldehyde dehydrogenase, which are significantly more toxic. Formic acid and formaldehyde can cause severe acidosis, damage to the optic nerve, and other life-threatening complications.

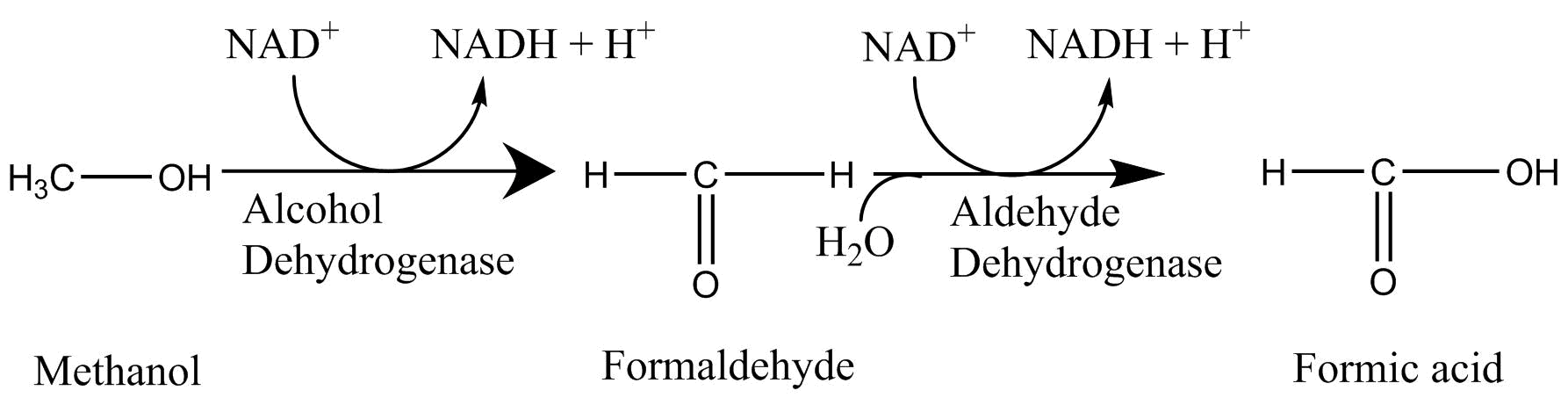

Ethylene glycol (common antifreeze) can be converted into toxic glycolic acid, glyoxylic acid and oxalic acid by aldehyde dehydrogenase, lactate dehydrogenase (LDH) and glycolate oxidase in mammalian organisms. The accumulation of the end product of the ethylene glycol mechanism, calcium oxalate, may cause malfunction in the kidney and lead to more severe consequences.

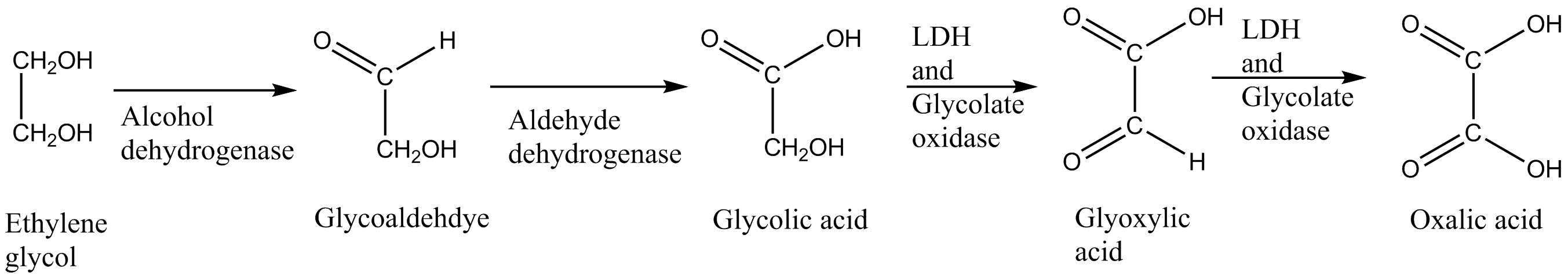

=== Other examples ===
Other examples of toxication by enzymatic metabolism include:

- Conversion of secondary amines in the stomach into carcinogenic nitrosamines via NO pathway.
- Nicotine into the nitrosated carcinogenic NNK (4-(methylnitrosamino)- 1-(3-pyridyl)-1-butanone) in the lung.
- Benzo[a]pyrene into the carcinogenic benzo[a]pyrene diol epoxide (BP-7,8-dihydrodiol-9,10-epoxide)
- Hypoglycin A into the highly toxic MCPA-CoA

== Toxication by abiotic chemical reactions ==
Increases in toxicity can also be caused by abiotic chemical reactions. Non-living elements affect the abiotic chemical reactions. Anthropogenic trace compounds (ATCs) have potential toxicity to the organisms in aquatic system.

Arsenic contamination in drinking water can be chemically toxic. The uptake and metabolism of arsenic may result in damage to the body. When organic arsenic is converted into more toxic inorganic arsenic, it causes carcinogenesis, cytotoxicity (toxic to cells) and genotoxicity (causing mutations in genes).

== See also ==
- Chelation therapy
- Detoxification
