= Vijay Diwas =

Vijay Diwas (lit. 'Victory Day') may refer to:

- Victory Day (Bangladesh), celebrated on 16 December in Bangladesh and India in commemoration of the Bangladesh Liberation War and the Indo-Pakistani war of 1971
- Kargil Vijay Diwas, celebrated on 26 July in India in commemoration of the Kargil War

== See also ==
- Vijay (disambiguation)
- Operation Vijay (disambiguation)
