= Varsity =

Varsity may refer to:

== Institutions ==
- University, an institution of higher (or tertiary) education and research which awards academic degrees in various academic disciplines
- Varsity College (South Africa), a school

== Places ==
- Varsity, Calgary, Alberta, Canada; a neighbourhood
- Varsity Lakes, Queensland, Australia; a suburb of the Gold Coast, Queensland, Australia
- The Varsity (West Lafayette, Indiana), USA; an apartment building

== Business ==
- The Varsity (restaurant), a drive-in restaurant in Atlanta, Georgia, US
- Varsity (pub chain), a UK pub chain

== Literature ==
- Varsity (Cambridge), a student newspaper at Cambridge University
- Varsity (Cape Town), a student newspaper of the University of Cape Town
- The Varsity (newspaper), a student newspaper at the University of Toronto

== Music ==
- Varsity (band), an indie rock band from Chicago
- "Varsity" (alma mater song), the alma mater song of the University of Wisconsin-Madison
- "Varsity" (fight song), a 1911 fight song of the University of Michigan
- Varsity, a 2014 EP by ASTR
- Varsity (group), a South Korean boy group formed by CSO Entertainment in 2017

== Stage and screen ==
- The Boys Presents: Varsity, a 2023 live-action adaptation of The Boys comic book series arc "We Gotta Go Now"
- Varsity (film), a lost 1928 American comedy silent film
- Varsity TV, a former teen-oriented television network

== Sports ==
=== University ===
- Varsity team, the principal athletic teams representing a North American college or university, high school, or middle school
  - Toronto Varsity Blues, varsity teams of the University of Toronto
    - Varsity Arena, the Varsity Blues' hockey arena
    - Varsity Stadium, the Varsity Blues' football stadium
- Varsity match, a sports fixture played between traditional rival universities
  - List of British and Irish varsity matches
  - Varsity (rowing regatta), a student rowing regatta in the Netherlands
  - Varsity Sports (South Africa), university sports league
    - Varsity Rugby, South African rugby union competitions
    - Varsity Hockey (South Africa)
    - Varsity Football (South Africa)
  - Varsity Cup Championship, an American college rugby competition

=== Other ===
- Varsity FC, a Canadian soccer team

== Transport ==
- Varsity (train), a passenger train of the Chicago, Milwaukee, St. Paul & Pacific Railroad, a.k.a., the Milwaukee Road
- Varsity Line, the railway line that formerly connected Oxford and Cambridge
- Vickers Varsity, a post-World War II military trainer aircraft based on the Vickers Viking

== Other uses ==
- Operation Varsity, an airborne operation in World War II
- Varsity Scouting, a program of the Boy Scouts of America for older boys

== See also ==
- Junior Varsity (disambiguation)
- University (disambiguation)
