= Junior Varsity (disambiguation) =

Junior Varsity players are the members of a team that is not the main team representing an institution in a competition.

Junior Varsity or variation, may refer to:

- The Junior Varsity, an American rock band formed in 2002
- Junior Varsity (band), an American alternative rock band formed in 2019, or their 2021 self-titled EP
- Junior Varsity (EP), a 2000 EP by Say Anything

== See also ==
- Junior (disambiguation)
- Varsity (disambiguation)
- JV (disambiguation)
