= JV =

JV may refer to:

== Businesses and brands ==
- Joint venture, an alliance between two businesses
- JV, a 1990s series of synthesizers made by the Roland Corporation
- JV!, a Russian media company owned by Mikhail Prokhorov
- Bearskin Airlines, Canada (IATA:JV)

== People ==
=== In sport ===
- Jonas Valančiūnas (born 1992), Lithuanian basketball player
- Jonathan Vaughters (born 1973), American cyclist
- Justin Verlander (born 1983), American baseball pitcher
- Jacques Villeneuve (born 1971), Canadian racing driver
- John Virgo (born 1946), English snooker player

=== Others ===
- JV Ejercito (born 1969), Filipino politician
- Jack Valenti (1921–2007), Motion Picture Association of America president
- Jeff Vandergrift, American host of radio show The Dog House (talk show)
- Jesse Ventura (born 1951), American politician and wrestler
- Justin Vernon (born 1981), American musician
- Jaclyn Victor (born 1978), Malaysian singer and actress
- Jason Voorhees, a fictional character in the Friday the 13th horror films

== Other uses ==
- Javanese language (ISO 639:JV), spoken in Indonesia
- Jesuit volunteer, an American charity worker
- Judicial vicar, of a Catholic ecclesiastical court
- Junior varsity team, in North American high school sports

== See also ==
- Junior Varsity (disambiguation)
- JVS (disambiguation)
- J (disambiguation)
- V (disambiguation)
- VJ (disambiguation)
