= Vijay =

Vijay may refer to:

== People ==
- Vijay (name), including a list of people with the name
- C. Joseph Vijay (born 1974), Indian politician and former actor, incumbent Chief Minister of Tamil Nadu
- Vijay (director) (1936–2020), Indian film director

== Films ==
- Vijay (1942 film), a 1942 Indian Hindi film
- Vijay (1988 film), a 1988 Indian Hindi film directed by Yash Chopra
- Vijay (1989 film), a 1989 Indian Telugu film directed by B. Gopal
- Vijay (TV series), an NDTV Imagine television series

== Characters ==
- Vijay (James Bond), an ally of James Bond in the 1983 film Octopussy, portrayed by Indian tennis player Vijay Amritraj
- Vijay, in the 2014 Indian film Queen, played by Rajkumar Rao
- Vijay, a criminal in the Indian film series Don, portrayed by Bachchan and Shah Rukh Khan
- Vijay Agnihotri, in the 1994 Indian film Anjaam, played by Shah Rukh Khan
- Vijay Dinanath Chauhan, a protagonist in the 1990 Indian film Agneepath and its 2012 remake, portrayed by Amitabh Bachchan and Hritik Roshan respectively
- Vijay Khanna, a police inspector in the 1970 Indian film Zanjeer and its 2013 remake, portrayed by Bachchan and Ram Charan respectively
- Vijay Matthews, the protagonist and titular character of the 2024 Indian film Vijay 69, played by Anupam Kher
- Vijay Salgaonkar, in the 2015 Indian film Drishyam and its sequels, played by Ajay Devgan
- Vijay Singh, the protagonist of the 1979 Indian film Kaala Patthar, portrayed by Bachchan
- Vijay Varma, portrayed by Bachchan in the 1980 Indian film Dostana
- Vijay Verma, a coolie portrayed by Bachchan in the 1975 Indian film Deewaar

== See also ==
- Star Vijay formerly Vijay TV, a Tamil-language television channel in India, owned by JioStar
- Vijayan, an Indian male given name
- Operation Vijay (disambiguation)
- Vijay Diwas (disambiguation)
- Vijaya (disambiguation)
- VJ (disambiguation)
- Veejay (disambiguation)
