= Methylene cyclopropyl acetic acid =

Names
- IUPAC name 2-(2-methylidenecyclopropyl)acetic acid
- Other names MCPA; Methylenecyclopropaneacetic acid

Identifiers
CAS Number	1073-00-3
3D model (JSmol)	Interactive image
ChEMBL	ChEMBL314481
ChemSpider	8389873
ECHA InfoCard	100.189.911
PubChem CID	10214381
UNII	516144FI4M
CompTox Dashboard (EPA)	DTXSID30910284
- InChI: InChI=1S/C6H8O2/c1-4-2-5(4)3-6(7)8/h5H,1-3H2,(H,7,8) Key: QJBXAEKEXKLLLZ-UHFFFAOYSA-N
- SMILES: OC(=O)CC1CC1=C

Properties
Chemical formula	C_{6}H_{8}O_{2}
Molar mass	112.128 g·mol^{−1}
- Except where otherwise noted, data are given for materials in their standard state (at 25 °C [77 °F], 100 kPa). Infobox references

Methylene cyclopropyl acetic acid (MCPA) is found in lychee seeds and is also a toxic metabolite in mammalian digestion after eating hypoglycin, present in the unripe ackee fruit, grown in Jamaica and in Africa. By blocking coenzyme A and carnitine, MPCA causes a decrease in β-oxidation of fatty acids, and hence gluconeogenesis.

== Overview ==
Methylene cyclopropyl acetic acid (MCPA) is a compound found in lychee (Litchi chinensis) seeds.

The major carbocyclic fatty acid in the seed oils of Litchi chinensis is a cyclopropane fatty acid named Dihydrosterculic acid; these have been found in many plants of the order Malvales (Malvaceae), in up to 60% of seed oil content, depending on the species but also in leaves, roots and shoots. They are accompanied by small amounts of their cyclopropanoid analogues, i.e. cyclopropyl acetic acid.

MPCA is also a metabolite in mammalian digestion after ingestion of hypoglycin, a rare and potentially toxic amino acid, chemically related to the common amino acid lysine. Hypoglycin is found in the unripe ackee fruit.

== Pathophysiology ==
MCPA forms non-metabolizable esters with coenzyme A (CoA) and carnitine, causing a decrease in their bioavailability and concentration in bodily tissue. Both of these cofactors are necessary for the β-oxidation of fatty acids, which in turn is vital for gluconeogenesis. MCPA also inhibits the dehydrogenation of a number of Acyl-CoA dehydrogenases. The inhibition of one in particular, butyryl CoA dehydrogenase (a short-chain acyl-CoA dehydrogenase), causes β-oxidation to cease before fully realized, which leads to a decrease in the production of NADH and Acetyl-CoA. The cascading effect continues, as this decrease in concentration further inhibits gluconeogenesis.

== Formation after ingestion of hypoglycin A ==
Hypoglycin A (left) undergoes deamination, forming α-ketomethylene-cyclopropylpropionic acid (KMCPP, center), which then forms MCPA (right) through oxidative decarboxylation.

Hypoglycin A is a water-soluble liver toxin, that upon ingestion, leads to hypoglycemia through the inhibition of gluconeogenesis, a metabolic pathway that leads to the generation of glucose from non-carbohydrate carbon sources (i.e. glucogenic amino acids, lactate, and glycerol). In addition, it also limits Acyl and carnitine cofactors, which are instrumental in the oxidation of large fatty acids.

Hypoglycin A undergoes deamination, forming α-ketomethylene-cyclopropylpropionic acid (KMCPP), which then forms MCPA through oxidative decarboxylation. Hypoglycin A (and hypoglycin B) is found in the ackee fruit, the national fruit of Jamaica, and, like Litchi chinensis, is a member of the family Sapindaceae. The fruit is rich in fatty acids, zinc, protein, and vitamin A. In the fully ripened arils of the fruit, Hypoglycin A is present at only 0.1ppm, but in the unripened fruit it can exceed a concentration of 1000ppm.

== Toxicity ==
Ingestion of the unripened fruit containing such a concentrated dose causes what is known as Jamaican vomiting sickness. Depending on the severity of the case, the symptoms range from headache, rapid heart beat and sweating to dehydration and low blood pressure stemming from intense vomiting, to delirium and coma, and finally seizures and death. The symptoms stemming from lychee poisoning are nearly identical, both being caused by MCPA, with lychee seeds also containing methylenecyclopropyl glycine (MCPG), a homologue of Hypoglycin A.

== Poisonings ==
In 2011 fourteen children reportedly perished in a poisoning incident in Bihar the largest producer of lychees in India. In 2014, numerous children died in Bihar after consuming lychees and the vast majority of fatalities were undernourished children, their preexisting low blood sugar detrimentally amplifying the effects. It is also possible that they ate unripe lychees. An epidemiological study from 2017 stated that "an acute neurological illness with high mortality among children occur[s] annually in Muzaffarpur" linked to poverty and consumption of litchi resulting in toxic encephalopathy.
