= Veejay =

Veejay may refer to:

- VJ (media personality), a television announcer who introduces music videos
- Vee-Jay Records, an American record label

== See also ==
- VJ (disambiguation)
- Vijay (disambiguation)
