= Hypoglycin A =

Hypoglycin
- Hypoglycin

Names
- IUPAC name 3-[(1R-2-Methylidenecyclopropyl]-L-alanine
- Systematic IUPAC name (2S)-2-Amino-3-[(1R)-2-methylidenecyclopropyl]propanoic acid
- Other names Hypoglycin A; Hypoglycine; 2-Methylenecyclopropanylalanine

Identifiers
CAS Number	156-56-9
3D model (JSmol)	Interactive image
ChEMBL	ChEMBL1615355
ChemSpider	9943349
ECHA InfoCard	100.189.936
PubChem CID	11768666
UNII	7GB7U7M282
CompTox Dashboard (EPA)	DTXSID70878975
- InChI: InChI=1S/C7H11NO2/c1-4-2-5(4)3-6(8)7(9)10/h5-6H,1-3,8H2,(H,9,10)/t5-,6+/m1/s1 Key: OOJZCXFXPZGUBJ-RITPCOANSA-N; InChI=1/C7H11NO2/c1-4-2-5(4)3-6(8)7(9)10/h5-6H,1-3,8H2,(H,9,10)/t5-,6+/m1/s1 Key: OOJZCXFXPZGUBJ-RITPCOANBH
- SMILES: O=C(O)[C@@H](N)C[C@@H]1C(=C)C1

Properties
Chemical formula	C_{7}H_{11}NO_{2}
Molar mass	141.170 g·mol^{−1}
Melting point	282 °C (540 °F; 555 K)
- Except where otherwise noted, data are given for materials in their standard state (at 25 °C [77 °F], 100 kPa). verify (what is ?) Infobox references

Hypoglycin A is a naturally occurring amino acid derivative found in the unripened fruit of the ackee tree (Blighia sapida) and in the seeds of the box elder tree (Acer negundo). It is toxic if ingested, and is the causative agent of Jamaican vomiting sickness. A 2017 Lancet report established a link between the consumption of unripened lychees (which contain hypoglycin A or the related chemical compound methylenecyclopropylglycine (MCPG)) resulting in hypoglycaemia and death from acute toxic encephalopathy.

== Sources ==
The entirety of the unripe ackee fruit is toxic and contains large amounts of hypoglycin. The fruit is safe to eat only when the fruit is allowed to fully open and expose the large black seeds while on the tree. The levels of the toxin decrease over time though from approximately 1000 ppm to around 0.1 ppm in the mature fruit.

Relatives of ackee, including lychee, longan, and rambutan, can contain enough α-(methylenecyclopropyl)glycine, a homologue of hypoglycin A, in their fruit to cause hypoglycemic encephalopathy in undernourished children, when consumed in large quantities.

== Toxicity ==
Hypoglycin A is a protoxin, meaning that the molecule is not toxic in itself but is broken down into toxic products when ingested. The branched-chain alpha-keto acid dehydrogenase complex, that normally converts leucine, isoleucine, or valine into acyl-CoA derivatives, converts Hypoglycin A into highly toxic MCPA-CoA. The FAD cofactor necessary for the beta oxidation of fatty acids associates with the alpha carbon of MCPA-CoA creating an irreversible complex that disables the enzyme. In addition, MCPA-CoA blocks some enzymes that are required for gluconeogenesis.

The reduction in gluconeogenesis and the reduction in fatty acid oxidation are thought to be the cause of most of the symptoms of Jamaican vomiting sickness. The blocking of fatty acid metabolism causes cells to start using glycogen for energy. Once glycogen is depleted, the body is unable to produce more, which leads to severe hypoglycemia. These biochemical effects are detected by an excess of medium chain fatty acids in urine and acidosis. Key treatments are aimed at circumventing or counteracting the biochemical changes, and include IV fluids and glucose, and hemodialysis in the case of renal failure.

== Synthesis ==
In 1958, John Carbon, William Martin, and Leo Swett were the first to synthesize hypoglycin A, in racemic form, starting from 2-bromopropene and ethyl diazoacetate to form the cyclopropane ring.

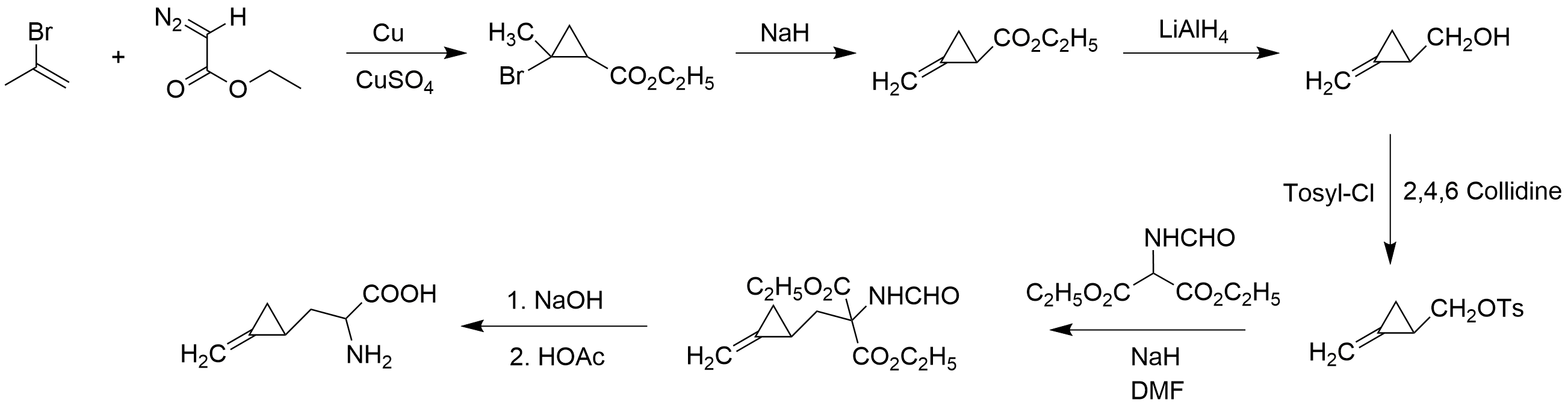
John Carbon's synthesis of Hypoglycin A

In 1992, Jack Baldwin, Robert Adlington, David Bebbington, and Andrew Russell accomplished the first asymmetric total synthesis of the individual diastereoisomers of hypoglycin A, using the Sharpless epoxidation to permit an asymmetric methylene cyclopropane synthesis. ^{1}H NMR and circular dichroism studies identifies the major diastereoisomer of natural hypogycin A as (2S, 4R) and the minor diastereoisomer as (2S, 4S).

== See also ==
- Hypoglycin B
