= List of national fruits =

This is a list of national fruits alphabetically arranged by country. Some national fruits are officially designated, some are unofficial.

| Country | Common name | Scientific name | Image | Ref. | Notes |
|---|---|---|---|---|---|
| Antigua and Barbuda | Antigua Black Pineapple | Ananas comosus | | | |
| Armenia | Apricot | Prunus armeniaca | | | |
| Azerbaijan | Pomegranate | Punica granatum | | | |
| Bangladesh | Jackfruit | Artocarpus heterophyllus | | | Jack Fruit is the national fruit of Bangladesh and is widely cultivated in tropical regions of Bangladesh. |
| Cambodia | Chicken egg banana (chek pong moan in Khmer) | Musa aromatica | | | The Royal Decree states the chicken egg banana is known as Musa aromatica but this is an outdated taxonomic name still used in Cambodia. This cultivar is also known as kluai khai in Thailand which has a similar meaning, that being "Egg Banana." It is known as pisang mas in Malaysia in which they can be found to be synonyms for the Lady's Finger Banana. |
| China | Fuzzy kiwifruit | Actinidia chinensis var. deliciosa | | | |
| Cuba | Mamey | Pouteria sapota | | | |
| Germany | Apple | Malus domestica | | | |
| Greece | Olive | Olea | | | |
| India | Mango | Mangifera indica | | | |
| Israel | Sabra/Prickly pear | Opuntia | | | |
| Jamaica | Ackee | Blighia sapida | | | |
| Japan | Japanese persimmon | Diospyros kaki | | | |
| Nepal | Mandarin orange | Citrus × Reticulata | | | Varieties widely cultivated in Nepal include Nepali Mandarin, Owari Satsuma and Unshiu Satsuma. Major areas in Sindhuli, Ramechhap and Gorkha. |
| Pakistan | Mango | Mangifera indica | | | |
| Serbia | Plum | Prunus domestica | | | The plum and its products are of great importance to Serbs and part of numerous customs. A Serbian saying says that the best place to build a house is where a plum tree grows best. The region of Šumadija in central Serbia is particularly known for its plums and Šljivovica, the national drink. |
| Spain | Grape | Vitis vinifera | | | There are over 400 varietals of grapes that are grown in Spain for wine production. |
| Sri Lanka | Jackfruit | Artocarpus heterophyllus | | | |
| Tajikistan | Apricot | Prunus armeniaca | | | In Tajikistan, apricots have a long history of cultivation, with more than 300 varieties and forms identified and documented in the country's local gene pool. Apricot cultivation is particularly widespread in the northern Sughd Region, especially around Isfara, which is known for its zardolui qandak (candy-sweet apricots). These apricots are consumed both fresh and dried and are used in Tajik cuisine, including in traditional desserts such as zarmos, an apricot ice cream. |
| United Arab Emirates | Dates | Phoenix dactylifera | | | |
| Ukraine | Water Elder | Viburnum opulus | | | |
