= Ackee and saltfish =

Jamaican national dish

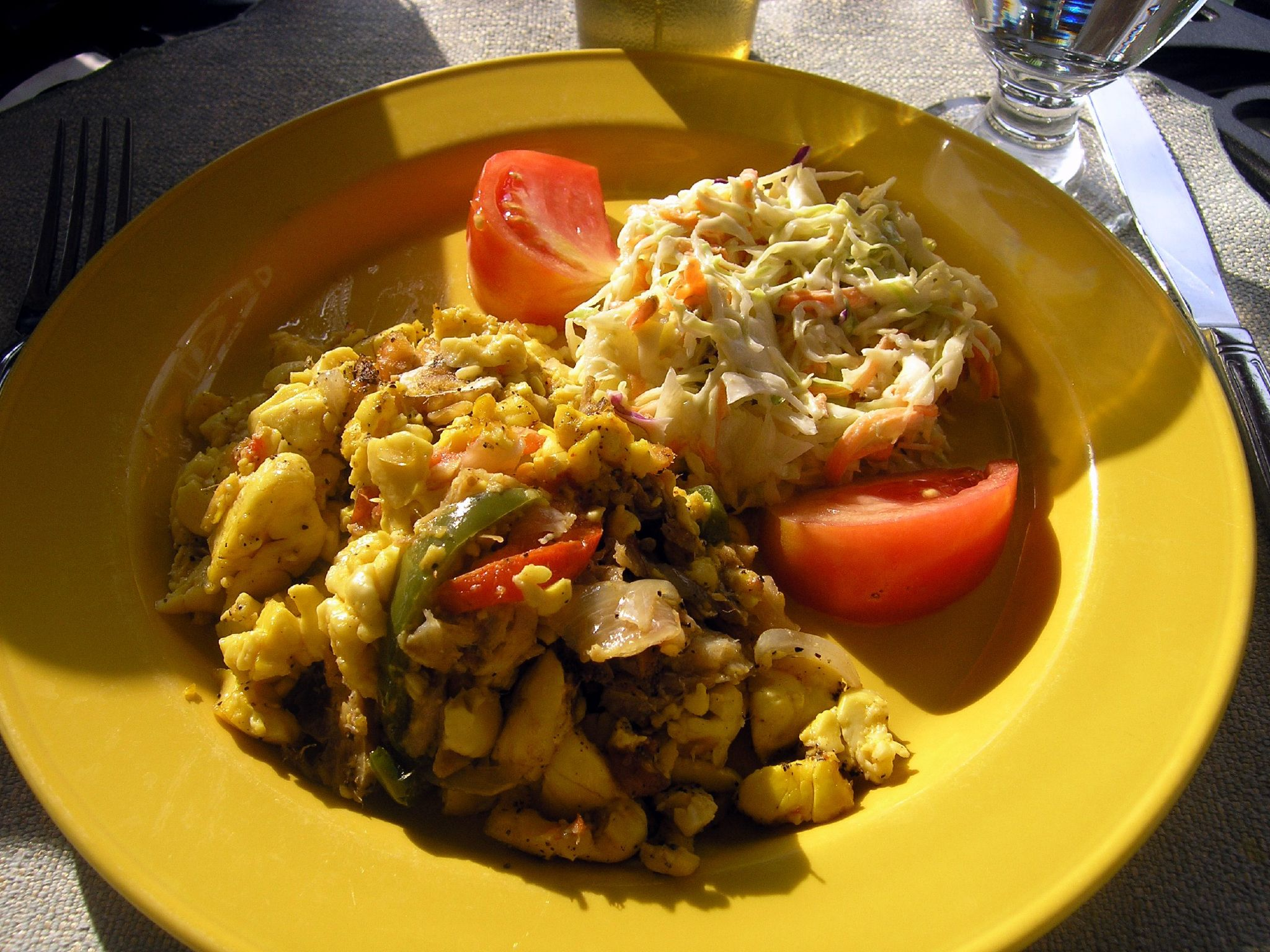
- Ackee and saltfish, served with coleslaw
- Course: Breakfast
- Place of origin: Jamaica
- Associated cuisine: Jamaican
- Main ingredients: Ackee and salt cod
- Ingredients generally used: Onion, Scotch bonnet pepper, tomato, spices

Ackee and saltfish is the Jamaican national dish prepared with sauteed ackee and salted codfish with things such as onion, green pepper and tomato.

== Background ==
The ackee fruit (Blighia sapida) is the national fruit of Jamaica. It was brought to the Caribbean from Ghana before 1725 as 'Ackee' or 'Aki', another name for the Akan people, Akyem. The fruit's scientific name honours Captain William Bligh who took the fruit from Jamaica to the Royal Botanic Gardens in Kew, England in 1793 and introduced it to science. Because parts of the fruit are toxic, such as the arils prior to the opening of the husk at the ripening stage, there are shipping restrictions when being imported to countries such as the United States. Salted codfish, on the other hand, was introduced to Jamaica for enslaved people as a long-lasting and inexpensive protein source. In West Africa, ackee is mainly used as medicine or an ingredient for soap and is not consumed as food. In other parts of West Africa like the Katiola, Sinématiali, and Khorogho regions of northern Côte d'Ivoire, ackee is consumed as food, typically as a dried paste, and in the Toussiana and Peni divisions in Burkina Faso.

== Preparation ==
To prepare the dish, salt cod is sautéed with boiled ackee, onions, Scotch bonnet peppers, tomatoes, then seasoned with spices like pepper and paprika. It can be garnished with bacon and tomatoes, and is usually served as breakfast alongside breadfruit, hard dough bread, Fried dumplings, or boiled green bananas.

Ackee and saltfish can also be eaten with rice and peas or plain white rice. When seasonings (onion, scallion, thyme, garlic) and saltfish are combined with plain rice it is often called "seasoned rice", which can be a one-pot meal including ackee.

== In popular culture ==
Ackee and saltfish is widely regarded as the national dish of Jamaica. According to The Guardian, Jamaican sprinter Usain Bolt often has ackee and saltfish for breakfast. Harry Belafonte's 1956 hit song "Jamaica Farewell" declares, "Ackee rice, saltfish are nice".

== See also ==
- List of Jamaican dishes
