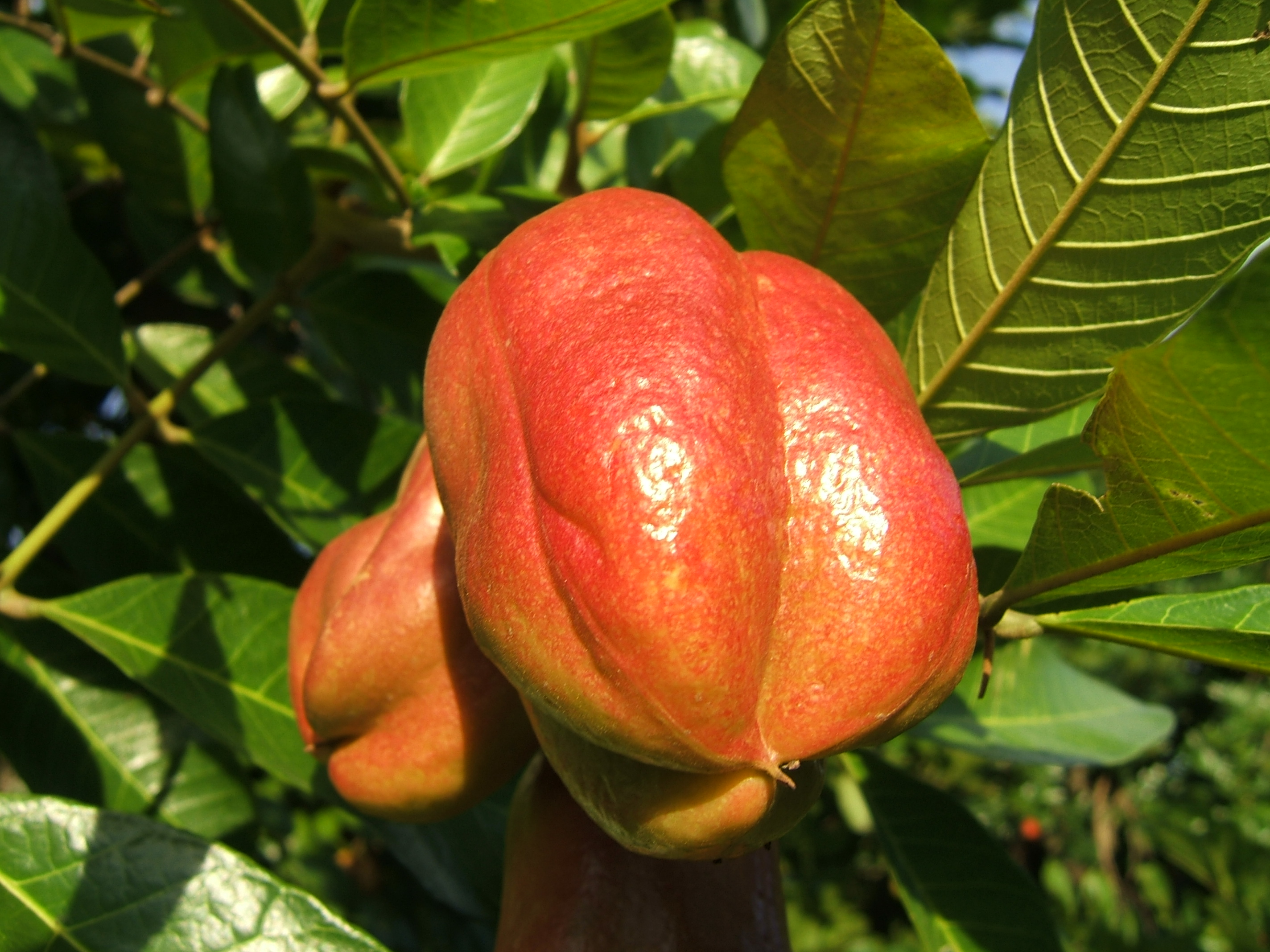
- Fruit

Conservation status
- Least Concern (IUCN 3.1)

Scientific classification
- Kingdom: Plantae
- Clade: Tracheophytes
- Clade: Angiosperms
- Clade: Eudicots
- Clade: Rosids
- Order: Sapindales
- Family: Sapindaceae
- Genus: Blighia
- Species: B. sapida

Binomial name
- Blighia sapida K.D.Koenig

Synonyms
- Cupania sapida (K.D.Koenig) Oken; Akea solitaria Stokes; Akeesia africana Tussac; Bonannia nitida Raf.; Cupania akeesia Cambess. ex Spach; Cupania edulis Schumach. & Thonn.; Sapindus obovatus Wight & Arn.

= Ackee =

Species of plant

The ackee (Note: Also spelled akee or achee.) (Blighia sapida), also known as ackee apple, is a fruit of the Sapindaceae (soapberry) family, as are the lychee and the longan. It is native to tropical West Africa. The scientific name honours Captain William Bligh who took the fruit from Jamaica to the Royal Botanic Gardens in Kew, England, in 1793. The English common name is derived from the West African Akan-language name akye fufo.

Although having a long-held reputation as being poisonous with potential fatalities, the fruit arils are renowned as delicious when ripe, prepared properly, and cooked and are a feature of various Caribbean cuisines. Ackee is the national fruit of Jamaica and is considered a delicacy.

== Botany ==
Ackee is an evergreen tree that grows about 10 metres tall, with a short trunk and a dense crown. The leaves are paripinnately, compound 15–30 centimetres (6–12 inches) long, with 6–10 elliptical to oblong leathery leaflets. Each leaflet is 8–12 cm (3–4 1/2 in) long and 5–8 cm (2–3 in) wide. The inflorescences are fragrant, up to 20 cm long, with unisexual flowers that bloom during warm months. Each flower has five greenish-white petals, which are fragrant.

The fruit is pear-shaped and has three lobes (two to four lobes are common). When it ripens it turns from green to a bright red to yellow-orange and splits open to reveal three large, shiny black seeds, each partly surrounded by soft, creamy or spongy, white to yellow flesh — the aril having a nut-like flavour and texture of scrambled eggs. The fruit typically weighs 100–200 grams (3 1/2–7 ounces). The tree can produce fruit throughout the year, although January–March and October–November are typically periods of fruit production.

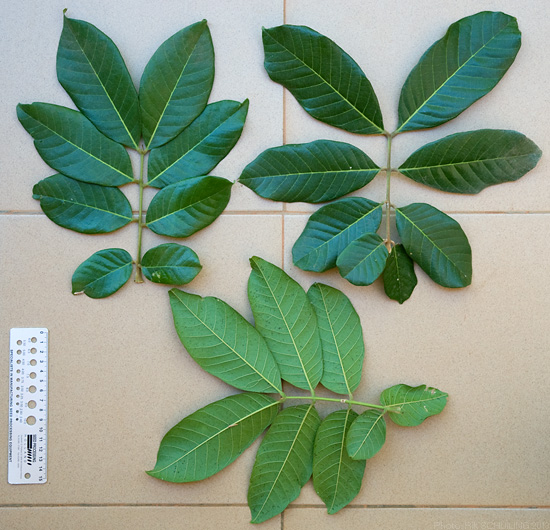
Leaves, upper and lower surface

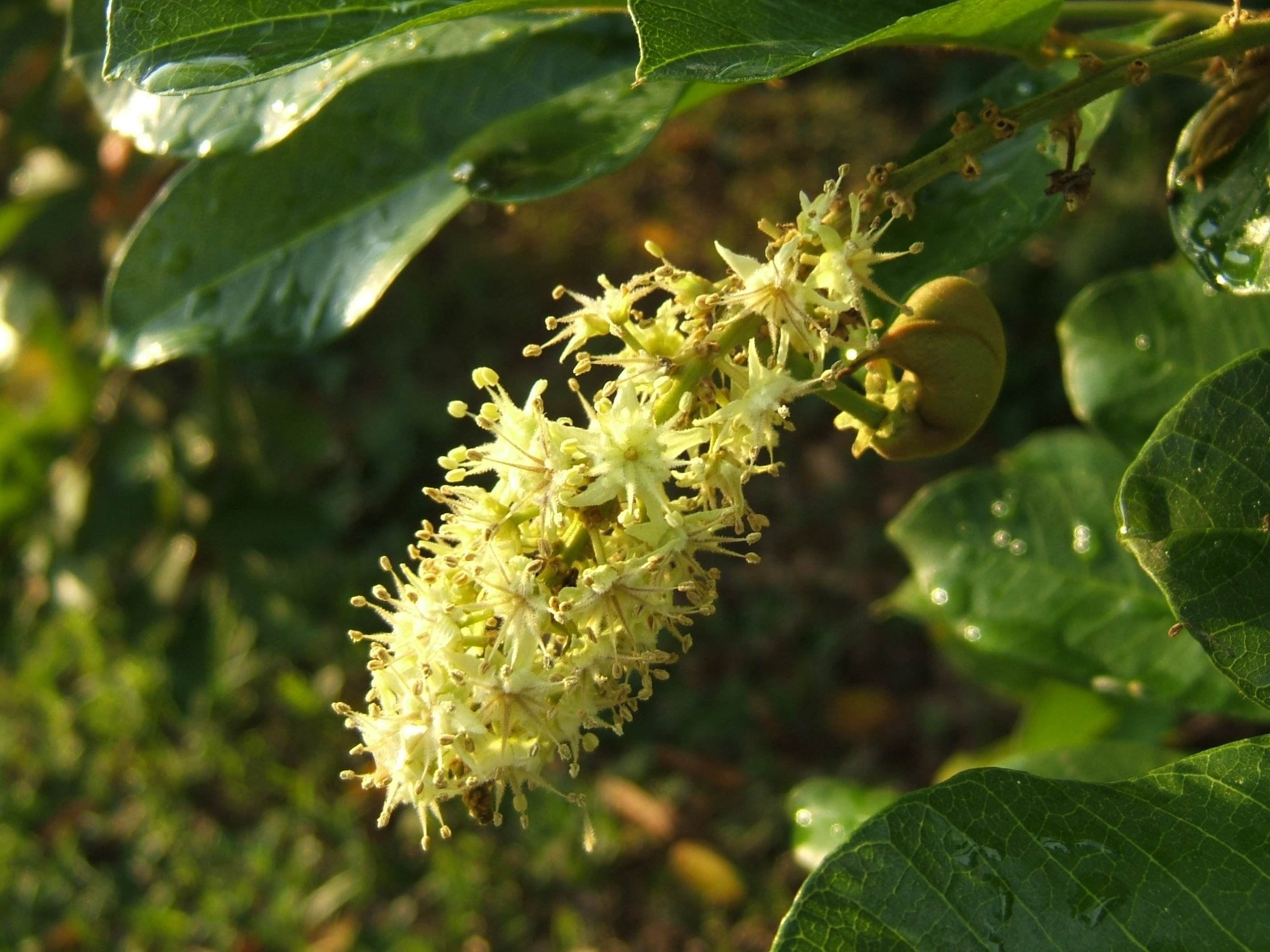
Inflorescence

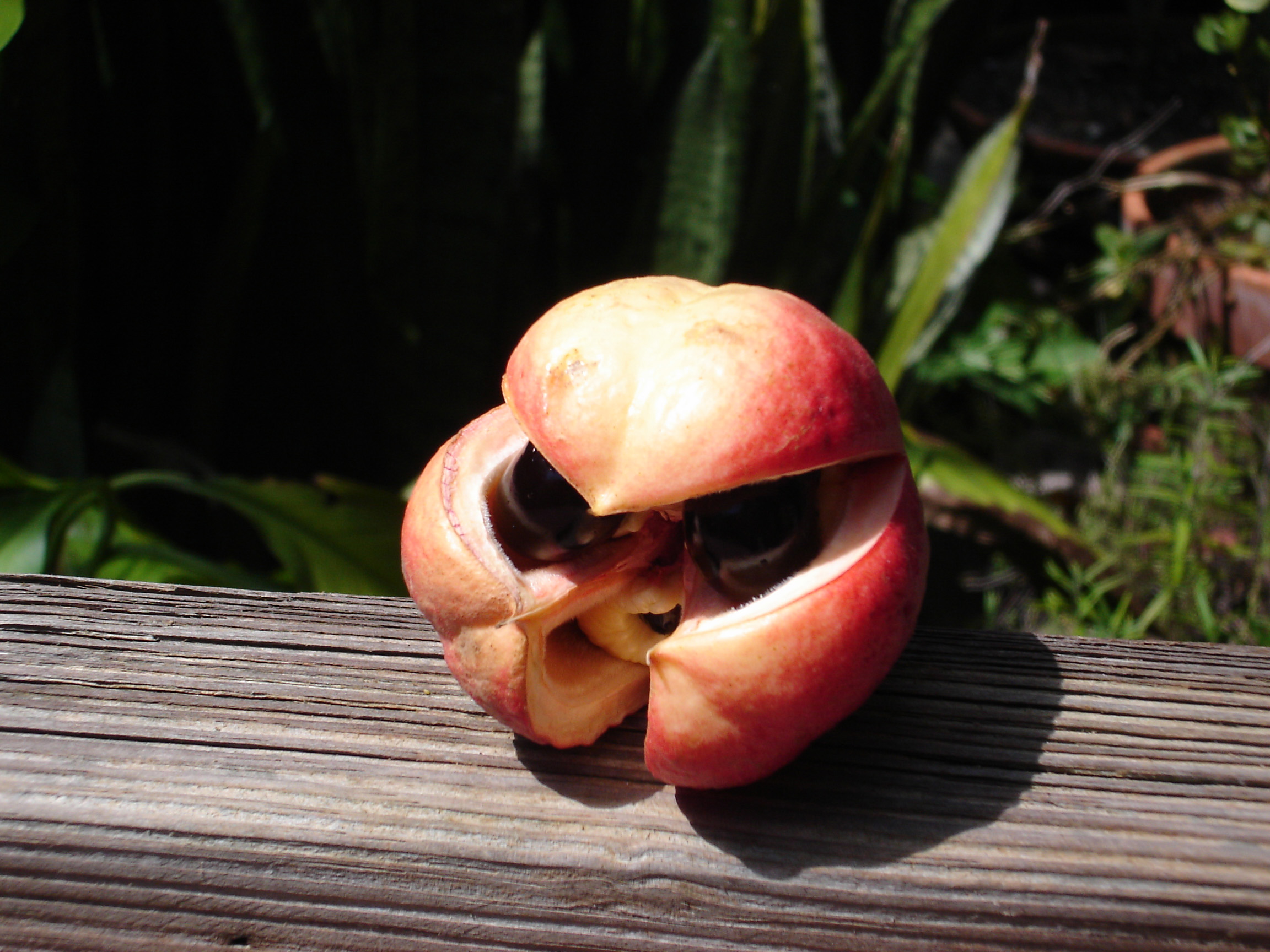
Fruit as it splits upon ripening "smile"

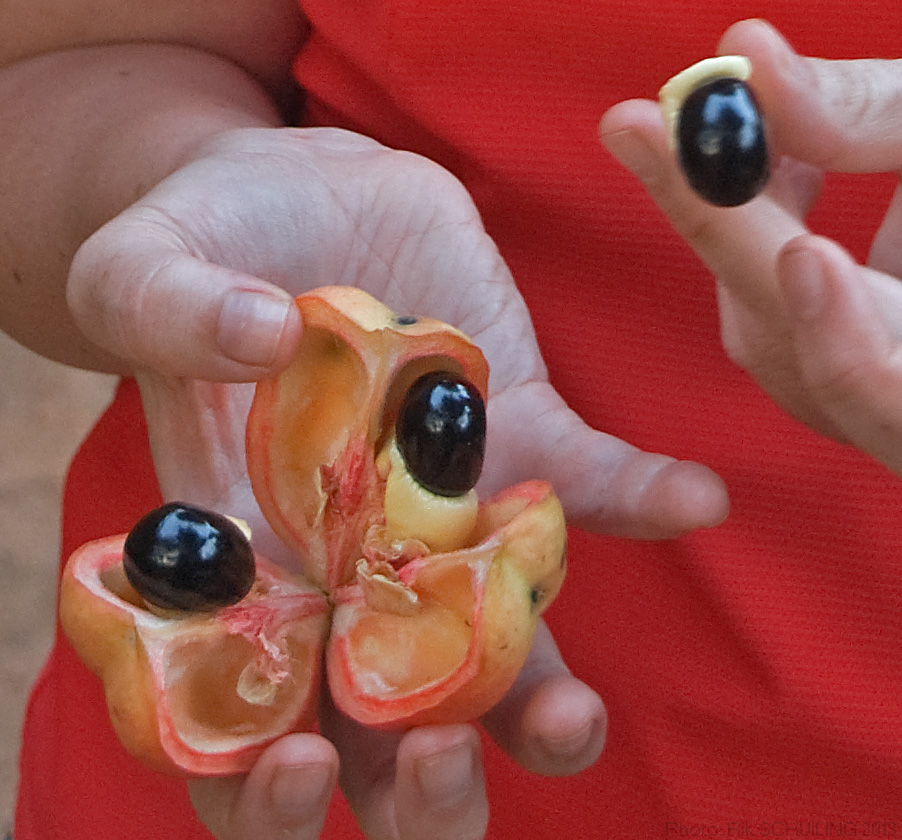
Showing ripe fruit and seeds with their arils

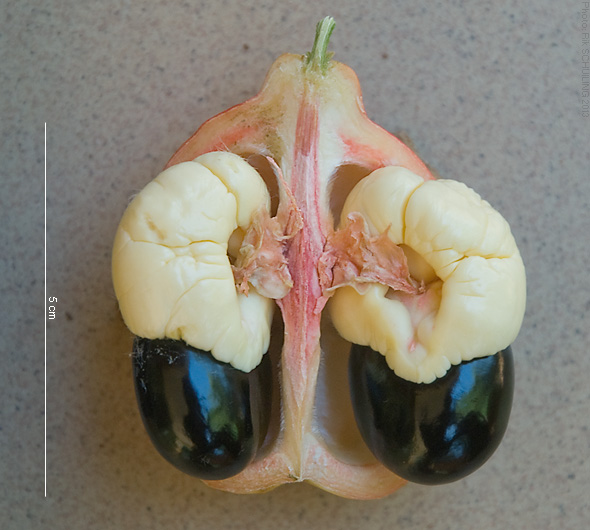
Part of ripe fruit, two seeds with their arils still attached

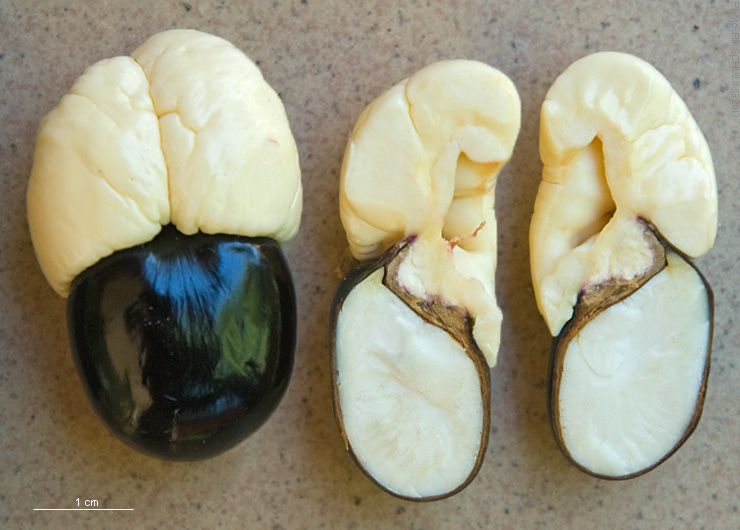
Ripe seeds with their arils (dorsal view and in longitudinal section)

== Cultivars ==
There are up to as many as forty-eight cultivars of ackee, which are grouped into either "butter" or "cheese" types. The cheese type is pale yellow in colour and is more robust and finds use in the canning industry. The butter type is deeper yellow colour, and is more delicate and better suited for certain cuisine.

== History and culinary use ==
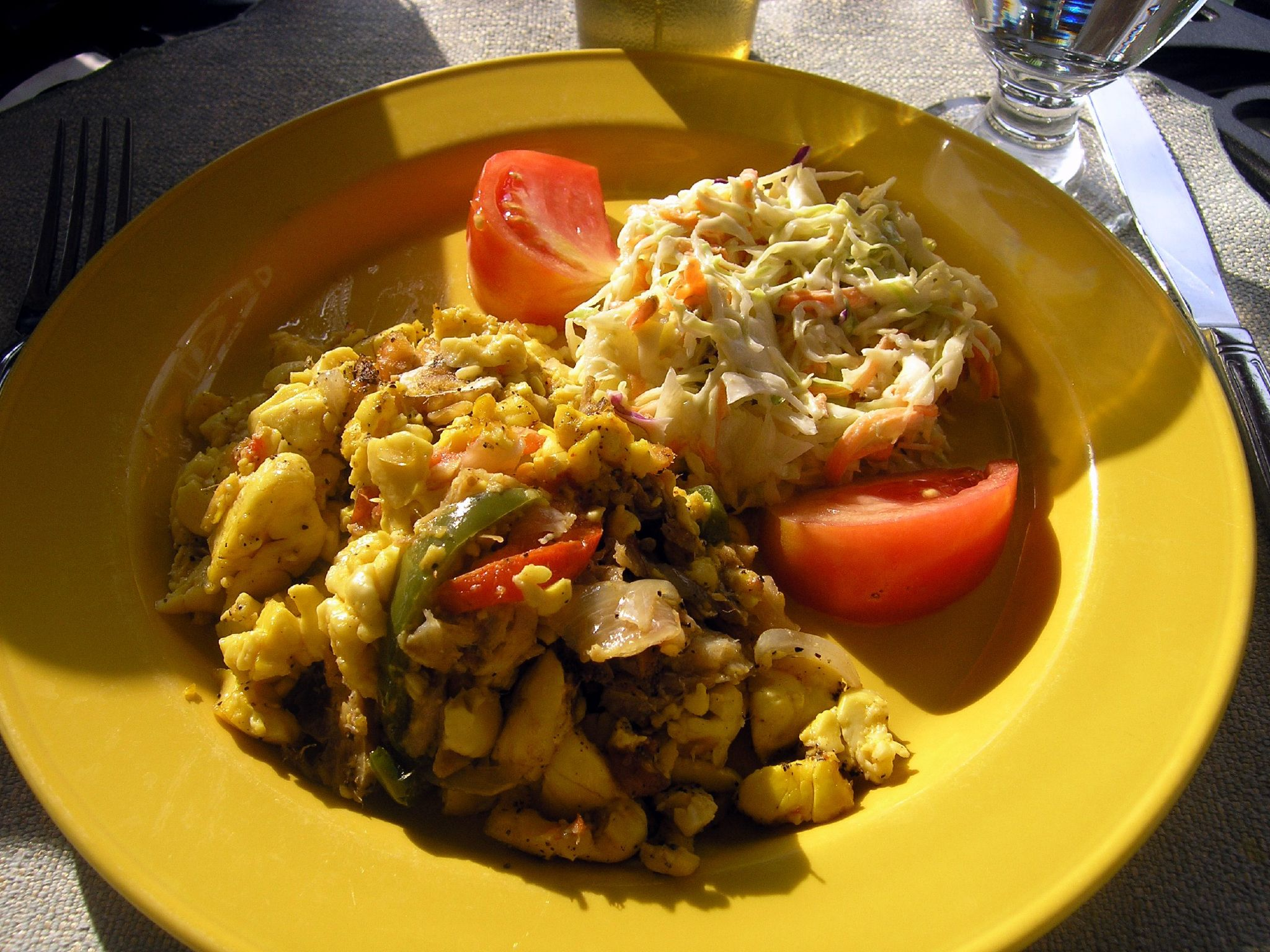
Ackee and saltfish, a traditional Jamaican dish

Imported to Jamaica from West Africa before 1773, the use of ackee in Jamaican cuisine is prominent. Ackee is the national fruit of Jamaica, while ackee and saltfish is the official national dish of Jamaica.

The ackee is allowed to open fully before picking in order to eliminate toxicity. When it has "yawned" or "smiled", the seeds are discarded and the fresh, firm arils are parboiled in salted water or milk, and may be fried in butter to create a dish. In Caribbean cooking, they may be cooked with codfish and vegetables, or may be added to stew, curry, soup or rice with seasonings.

== Nutrition ==
Ackee
Nutritional value per 100 g (3.5 oz)
- Carbohydrates: 9.55 g
- Dietary fiber: 3.45 g
- Fat: 18.78 g
- Protein: 8.75 g
Vitamins and minerals
Vitamins	Quantity %DV^{†}
Thiamine (B1)	8% 0.10 mg
Riboflavin (B2)	14% 0.18 mg
Niacin (B3)	23% 3.74 mg
Vitamin C	72% 65 mg
Minerals	Quantity %DV^{†}
Calcium	6% 83 mg
Iron	31% 5.52 mg
Phosphorus	8% 98 mg
- Raw arils after pods allowed to open naturally. Seeds removed
- ^{†}Percentages estimated using US recommendations for adults.

Ackee contains a moderate amount of carbohydrates, protein, and fat, providing 51–58% of the dry weight of the arils as composed of fatty acids – linoleic, palmitic, and stearic acids. The raw fruit is a rich source of vitamin C.

== Society and culture ==
The ackee is prominently featured in the Jamaican mento-style folk song "Linstead Market". In the song, a market seller laments, "Carry mi ackee go a Linstead market. Not a quattie worth sell". The Beat's 1982 album Special Beat Service includes the song "Ackee 1-2-3".

== Toxicity ==
Hypoglycin A

The unripened aril and the inedible portions of the fruit contain hypoglycin toxins including hypoglycin A and hypoglycin B, known as "soapberry toxins". Hypoglycin A is found in both the seeds and the arils, while hypoglycin B is found only in the seeds. Minimal quantities of the toxin are found in the ripe arils. In the unripe fruit, depending on the season and exposure to the sun, the concentrations may be up to 10 to 100 times greater.

These two molecules are converted in the body to methylenecyclopropylacetic acid (MCPA), and are toxic with potential lethality. MCPA and hypoglycin A inhibit several enzymes involved in the breakdown of acyl CoA compounds, often binding irreversibly to coenzyme A, carnitine and carnitine acyltransferase I and II, reducing their bioavailability and consequently inhibiting beta oxidation of fatty acids. Glucose stores are consequently depleted leading to hypoglycemia, and to a condition called Jamaican vomiting sickness. These effects occur only when the unripe aril (or an inedible part of the fruit) is consumed.

Though ackee is used widely in traditional dishes, research on its potential hypoglycin toxicity has been sparse and preliminary, requiring evaluation in well-designed clinical research to better understand its pharmacology, food uses, and methods for detoxification.

In 2011, it was found that as the fruit ripens, the seeds act as a sink whereby the hypoglycin A in the arils convert to hypoglycin B in the seeds. In other words, the seeds help in detoxifying the arils, bringing the concentration of hypoglycin A to a level that is generally safe for consumption.

== Commercial use ==
Ackee canned in brine is a commodity item and is used for export by Jamaica, Haiti and Belize. If propagated by seed, trees will begin to bear fruit in 3–4 years. Cuttings may yield fruit in 1–2 years.

== Other uses ==
The fruit has various uses in West Africa and in rural areas of the Caribbean Islands, including use of its "soap" properties as a laundering agent or fish poison. The fragrant flowers may be used as decoration or cologne, and the durable heartwood used for construction, pilings, oars, paddles and casks. In African traditional medicine, the ripe arils, leaves or bark were used to treat minor ailments.

The seeds were formerly used as standardised weights for weighing gold dust, leading to the currency issued by Great Britain in the former colony of Gold Coast to be named the "Gold Coast ackey".

== Vernacular names in African languages ==
Language	Word	Meaning
Bambara	finsan	akee apple
Kabiye	kpɩ́zʋ̀ʋ̀	akee apple
Yoruba	iṣin	
Dagaare	kyira	
Ewe	atsa	
