= The Varsity (West Lafayette, Indiana) =

- U.S. National Register of Historic Places
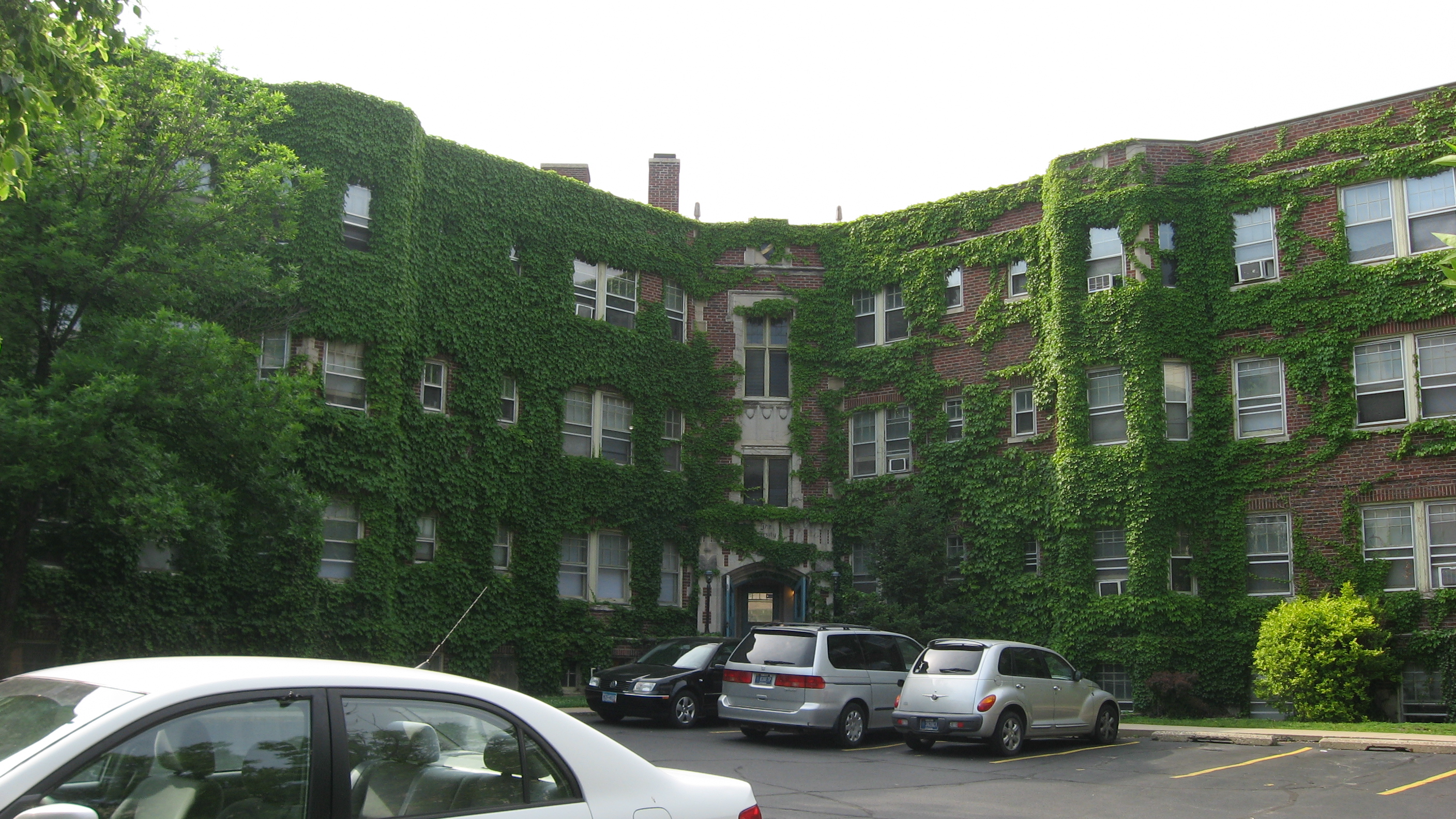
- The Varsity, May 2011

- Location within Tippecanoe County, Indiana Location within Indiana Location within the United States
- Location: 101 Andrew Place, West Lafayette, Indiana
- Coordinates: 40°25′27″N 86°54′33″W
- Area: less than one acre
- Built: 1928
- Architect: Scholer, Walter
- Architectural style: Tudor Revival
- NRHP reference No.: 01001342
- Added to NRHP: December 7, 2001

The Varsity is a historic apartment building located at West Lafayette, Indiana. It was built in 1928, and is a three-story, L-shaped, Tudor Revival style brick building. It has a limestone quoins and detailing, a Tudor-arched entrance, projecting pavilions, and semi-hexagonal projecting bays.

It was listed on the National Register of Historic Places in 2001.
