= Hypoglycin =

Hypoglycin may refer to:

- Hypoglycin A
- Hypoglycin B
