= Jamaican vomiting sickness =

- Specialty: Toxicology

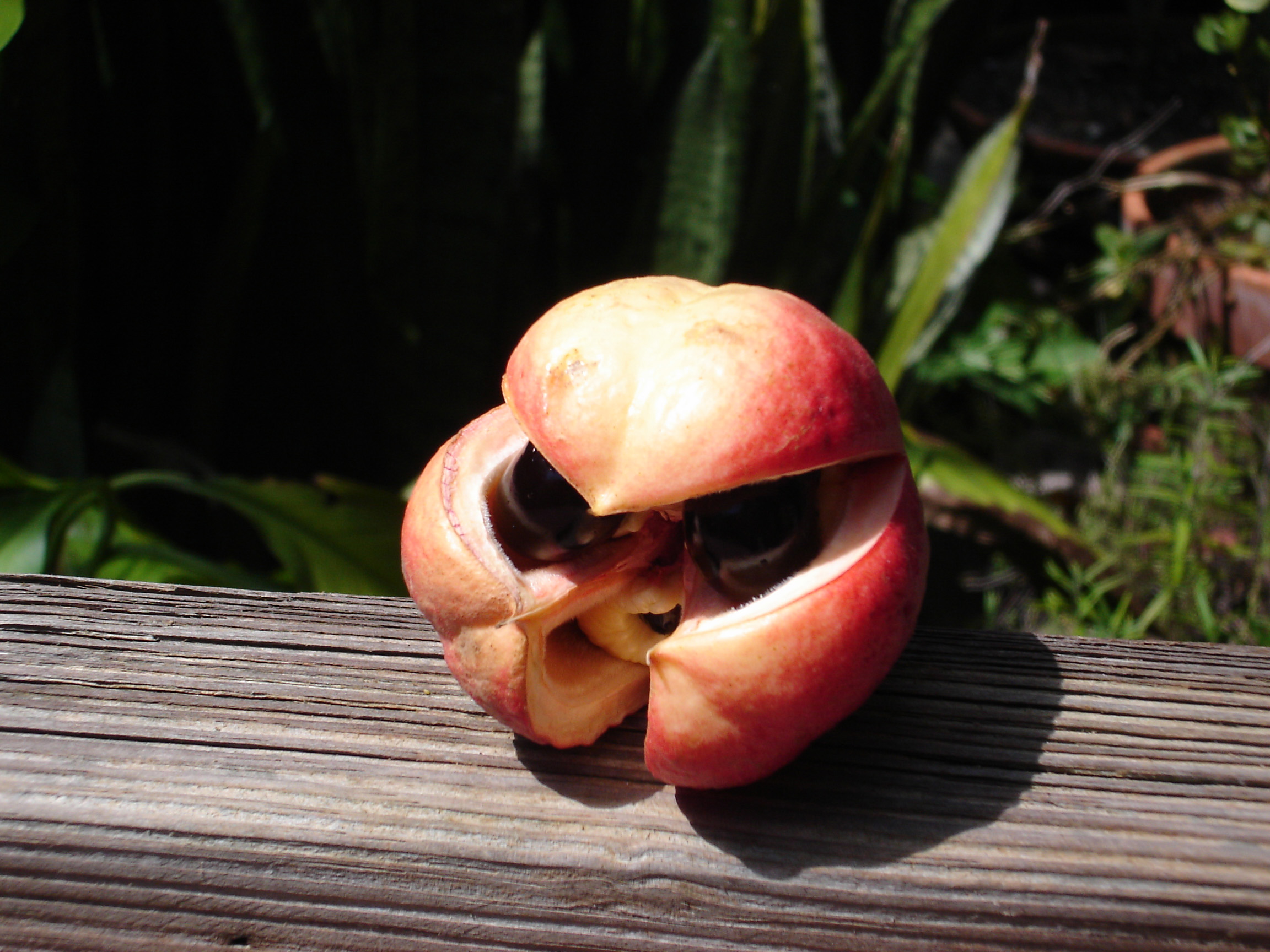
An akee fruit, which can cause THS

Jamaican vomiting sickness, also known as toxic hypoglycemic syndrome (THS), acute ackee fruit intoxication, or ackee poisoning, is an acute illness caused by the toxins hypoglycin A and hypoglycin B, which are present in fruit of the ackee tree. Unripe arils contain concentrations of hypoglycin A that are 20-fold higher than those of ripe arils. Vomiting is a symptom of a toxic encephalopathy which can result even in death. Some countries in the Caribbean and Western Africa experience frequent cases.

== Presentation ==
Abdominal discomfort begins two to six hours after eating unripe ackee fruit, followed by sudden onset vomiting. In severe cases, profound dehydration, seizures, coma, and death may ensue. Children and those who are malnourished are more susceptible to the disease. Clinically the diagnosis is that of a toxic encephalopathy.

== Pathophysiology ==
When ingested, hypoglycin A is metabolized to produce methylenecyclopropylacetic acid (MCPA). MCPA acts to inhibit the beta-oxidation of fatty acids in two ways. First, it interferes with the transport of long-chain fatty acids into the mitochondria by forming ester linkages with carnitine and coenzyme A (CoA). Also, it inhibits acyl-CoA dehydrogenases, so that only unsaturated fatty acids can be fully oxidized. Fatty acids accumulate in the liver in a microvesicular pattern that can be seen on biopsy. In the absence of fatty acid metabolism, the body becomes dependent on glucose and glycogen for energy. Octreotide can be used to reduce the secretion of insulin by the pancreas, thereby preventing severe hypoglycemia.

Inhibition of beta-oxidation of fatty acids, however, also depletes nicotinamide adenine dinucleotide (NADH) and acetyl CoA—the latter an activator of pyruvate carboxylase—inhibiting gluconeogenesis. Once the liver glycogen stores are depleted, the body cannot synthesize glucose, and severe hypoglycemia results.

Initial symptoms appear after about four hours, and deaths have been reported from 12 to 48 hours following consumption. Supportive care involves carefully metered IV glucose infusion and fluid/electrolyte replacement; mortality was 80% before glucose infusion was introduced in 1954.

A similar outbreak of lethal hypoglycemic encephalopathy has been linked to the consumption of lychee fruit in Muzaffarpur, India. Urinalysis of children affected by the disease has shown all affected have elevated levels of hypoglycin suggesting the same underlying pathophysiology as Jamaican vomiting sickness.

== In popular culture ==
The disease appears in the ER episode "Great Expectations", where the symptoms are recognised by Dr. Mallucci who, it is later revealed, attended medical school in Grenada.

== See also ==
- Reye syndrome
- Methylene cyclopropyl acetic acid
