= Hypoglycin B =

- Hypoglycin B

Names
- IUPAC name γ-Glutamyl-3-[(1R-2-methylidenecyclopropyl]alanine
- Systematic IUPAC name (2S)-5-({(1S)-1-Carboxy-2-[(1S)-2-methylidenecyclopropyl]ethyl}amino)-5-oxopentanoic acid
- Other names L-γ-Glutamyl-L-hypoglycin; L-γ-Glutamyl-3-[(1S)-2-methylenecyclopropyl]-L-alanine

Identifiers
CAS Number	502-37-4
3D model (JSmol)	Interactive image
ChEBI	CHEBI:6332
ChemSpider	390178
KEGG	C08280
PubChem CID	441445
UNII	T83F0X4NGN
CompTox Dashboard (EPA)	DTXSID10894992
- InChI: InChI=1S/C12H18N2O5/c1-6-4-7(6)5-9(12(18)19)14-10(15)3-2-8(13)11(16)17/h7-9H,1-5,13H2,(H,14,15)(H,16,17)(H,18,19)/t7-,8-,9-/m0/s1 Key: UYDZYCPIQSRXKU-CIUDSAMLSA-N; InChI=1/C12H18N2O5/c1-6-4-7(6)5-9(12(18)19)14-10(15)3-2-8(13)11(16)17/h7-9H,1-5,13H2,(H,14,15)(H,16,17)(H,18,19)/t7-,8-,9-/m0/s1 Key: UYDZYCPIQSRXKU-CIUDSAMLBD
- SMILES: O=C(N[C@H](C(=O)O)C[C@H]1C(=C)C1)CC[C@@H](C(=O)O)N

Properties
Chemical formula	C_{12}H_{18}N_{2}O_{5}
Molar mass	270.285 g·mol^{−1}
- Except where otherwise noted, data are given for materials in their standard state (at 25 °C [77 °F], 100 kPa). verify (what is ?) Infobox references

Hypoglycin B is a naturally occurring organic compound in the species Blighia sapida. It is particularly concentrated in the fruit of the plant especially in the seeds. Hypoglycin B is toxic if ingested and is one of the causative agents of Jamaican vomiting sickness. It is a dipeptide of glutamic acid and hypoglycin A.
