= SJV =

SJV may refer to:

- San Javier Airport (Bolivia), IATA airport code
- San Joaquin Valley, the southernmost portion of the California Central Valley
- Stern Joint Venture, L.P., founded by James D. Stern
- Shree Jain Vidyalaya, Kolkata, India, a secondary school
- Saint John Vianney Seminary (Minnesota)
- St. Jean Vianney School, Baton Rouge, Louisiana, USA
- St. John Vianney Cure of Ars Church (Bronx), New York City, New York State, USA
- Socialist Youth League of Germany (German: Sozialistischer Jugend-Verband Deutschlands; SJV)
- Super Air Jet, airline's ICAO code
