= Vijaya =

Vijaya may refer to:

== Places ==
- Vijaya (Champa), a city-state and former capital of the historic Champa in what is now Vietnam
- Vijayawada, a city in Andhra Pradesh, India

== People ==
- Prince Vijaya of Sri Lanka (fl. 543–505 BC), earliest recorded king of Sri Lanka
- Vijaya (Satavahana) (c. 3rd century), Indian ruler of the Satavahana dynasty; successor of Yajna Sri Satakarni
- Vijaya Manikya I (r. 1488), king of Tripura
- Vijaya Manikya II (r. 1532–1563), king of Tripura
- Vijaya-Bhattarika (r. c. 650–655), regent of the Chalukya dynasty of southern India
- Vijaya Kumaratunga (1945–1988), Sri Lankan actor, social activist, politician
- Vijaya Nandasiri (1944–2016), Sri Lankan actor, director, producer, singer
- Vijaya Lakshmi Pandit (1900–1990), Indian diplomat and politician
- Jagannathan Vijaya (1959–1987), Indian herpetologist

== Hindu mythology ==
- Vijaya (bow), the personal bow of Shiva, Parashurama and Karna
- Vijaya, daughter of Dyutimat, the king of Madra Kingdom
- Jaya-Vijaya, the door-keepers of Vaikuntha, the realm of the god Vishnu in Hindu mythology
- Vijaya, consort of Kalki

== Other uses ==
- Vijaya Vauhini Studios, a film studio based in Chennai, India
- Vijaya (film), a 1973 Tamil film
- House of Vijaya, a Sinhalese royal dynasty
- Vijaya (font), a font introduced in Windows 7

== See also ==
- Vijaya College (disambiguation)
- Vijay (disambiguation)
- Vijayalakshmi (disambiguation)
- Vijaynagar (disambiguation)
- Wijaya (disambiguation)
- Widjaja (disambiguation)
- Bijoya (disambiguation)
- Bama Vijayam (disambiguation)
- Dasan and Vijayan, fictional characters in a series of Indian films
