= People Power Revolution =

1986 demonstrations in the Philippines

- Hundreds of thousands of people filling up EDSA highway in a political demonstration.
- Date: February 22–25, 1986 (February 25, 1986; 40 years ago)
- Location: Philippines, primarily EDSA, Metro Manila
- Caused by: Assassination of Ninoy Aquino in 1983; Fraud during the 1986 snap presidential election; Decades of oppressive, autocratic and kleptocratic rule; Public funds siphoned
- Goals: Removal of Ferdinand Marcos from power; Installation of Corazon Aquino as President; Restoration of democracy in the Philippines
- Result: Opposition victory: Ferdinand Marcos removed from office; End of the Marcos regime; Marcos clan flees to Hawaii, would later return to the country; Start of the Fifth Republic; Corazon Aquino becomes president

Parties
| Opposition; Political parties: UNIDO; PDP–Laban; Liberal Party; Military defectors: Reform the Armed Forces Movement; Philippine Constabulary; Other defectors of the Armed Forces; Others: Anti-Marcos civilian protesters; Religious groups: Archdiocese of Manila; CBCP; Protestant churches of the Philippines; Militant groups: Bagong Alyansang Makabayan; Kilusang Mayo Uno; League of Filipino Students; Christians for National Liberation | Government Military loyalists: Armed Forces of the Philippines; Presidential Security Command; Integrated National Police; Government parties: Kilusang Bagong Lipunan; Religious groups: Iglesia ni Cristo; Others: Pro-Marcos civilian supporters |

Lead figures
| Corazon Aquino Others: Salvador Laurel; Juan Ponce Enrile; Fidel Ramos; Gringo Honasan; Jaime Sin | Ferdinand Marcos Others: Imelda Marcos; Fabian Ver; Arturo Tolentino |

Number
| 2,000,000+ protestors | No figures available |

Casualties and losses
| 13 to 18 | 2 |

The People Power Revolution, also known as the EDSA Revolution (Note: Other alternative names include the Philippine Revolution of 1986, EDSA 1986, EDSA I (pronounced EDSA One or EDSA Uno), People Power Revolution I, and EDSA People Power Revolution.), the Bloodless Revolution, or the February Revolution, was a series of popular demonstrations in the Philippines, mostly in Metro Manila, from February 22 to 25, 1986. There was a sustained campaign of civil resistance against regime violence and electoral fraud. The nonviolent revolution led to the departure of Ferdinand Marcos, the end of his 20-year dictatorship, and restoration of democracy in the Philippines.

It is also referred to as the Yellow Revolution due to the presence of yellow ribbons during demonstrations (in reference to the Tony Orlando and Dawn song "Tie a Yellow Ribbon Round the Ole Oak Tree") as a symbol of protest following the assassination of Filipino senator Benigno "Ninoy" Aquino Jr. in August 1983 upon his return to the Philippines from exile. It was widely seen as a victory of the people against two decades of presidential rule by President Marcos, and made news headlines as "the revolution that surprised the world".

The majority of the demonstrations took place on a long stretch of highway known as the EDSA (Epifanio de los Santos Avenue) in Metro Manila from February 22 to 25, 1986. They involved over two million Filipino civilians, as well as several political and military groups, and religious groups led by Cardinal Jaime Sin, the Archbishop of Manila, along with Catholic Bishops' Conference of the Philippines President Cardinal Ricardo Vidal, the Archbishop of Cebu. The demonstrations were remembered as a "Rosary miracle" for their peaceful victory.

The protests, fueled by the resistance and opposition after years of governance by President Marcos and his cronies, ended with the ruler, his family, and some of their supporters fleeing to exile in Hawaii, and Ninoy Aquino's widow, Corazon Aquino, inaugurated as the eleventh President of the Philippines.

In 2003, the Radio Broadcast of the Philippine People Power Revolution was inscribed in the UNESCO Memory of the World International Register.

== Background and history ==
Senate President Ferdinand Marcos was elected president in 1965, defeating incumbent President Diosdado Macapagal by a margin of 52 to 43 percent. During this time, Marcos was very active in the initiation of public works projects and the intensification of tax collections. Marcos and his government claimed that they "built more roads than all his predecessors combined and more schools than any previous administration". Amidst charges from the opposition party of vote-buying and a fraudulent election, President Marcos was reelected in the 1969 Philippine presidential election, this time defeating Sergio Osmeña Jr. by 61 to 39 percent.

President Marcos's second term for the presidency was marred by allegations by the opposition Liberal Party of widespread graft and corruption. The increasing disparity of wealth between the very wealthy and the very poor that made up the majority of the Philippines' population led to a rise in crime and civil unrest around the country. In March 1969, the New People's Army (NPA) was formed as the military wing of the Communist Party of the Philippines, initiating the still-ongoing CPP–NPA–NDF rebellion. Marcos quickly denounced the movement, hoping to gain monetary and political support from anti-Communist administrators in the United States.

In 1972, the Moro National Liberation Front, a militant Muslim separatist group, formed in the southern island of Mindanao.

Marcos soon used the rise of militant and civil unrest as justification for declaring martial law.

=== Martial law ===
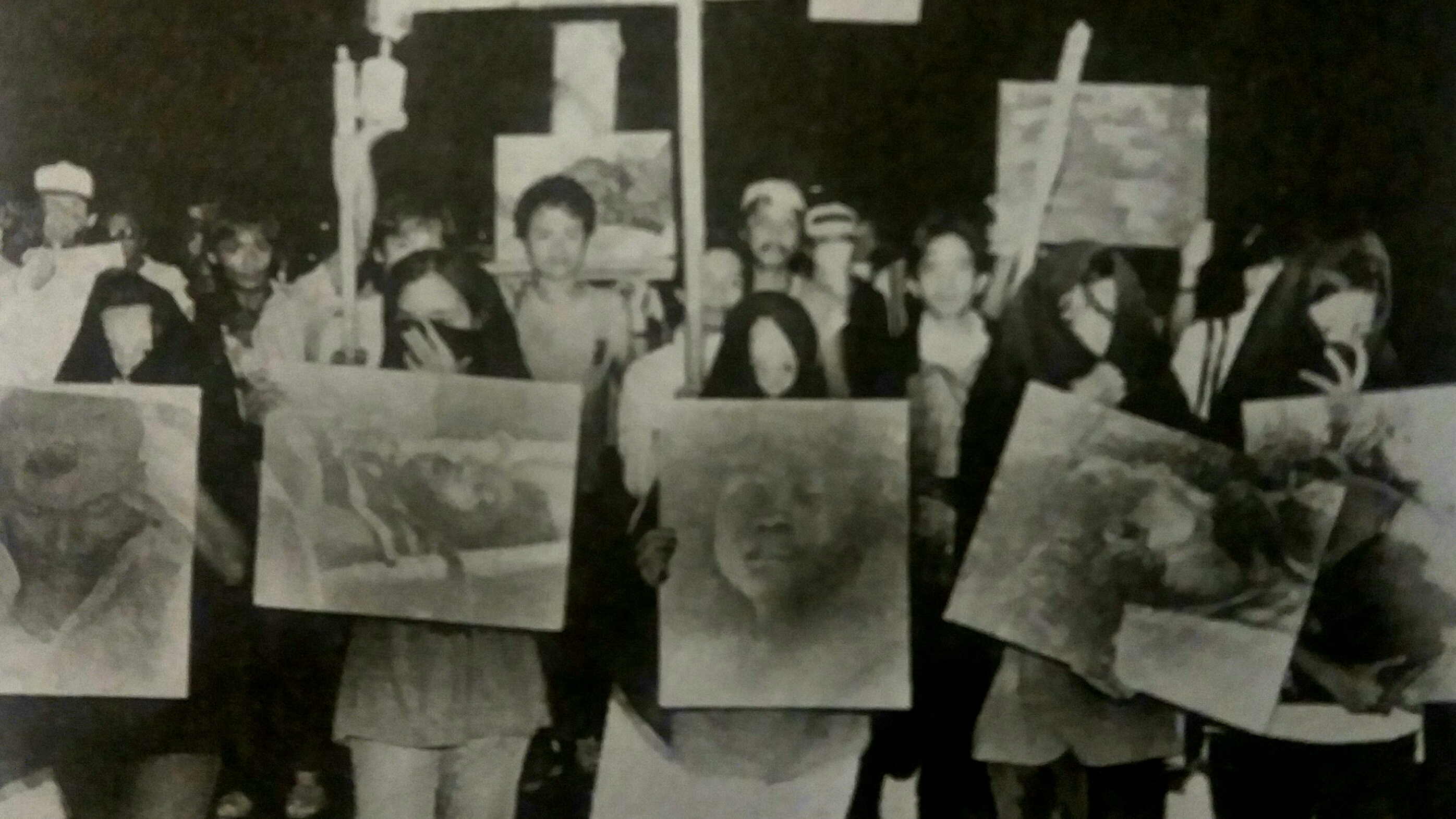
Martial law protest

Barred from running for a third term as president in 1973, Marcos announced Proclamation No. 1081 on September 23, 1972, declaring martial law, using the civil unrest that arose after the 1969 Philippine balance of payments crisis as a justification for the proclamation.

Through this decree and through a controversial referendum in which citizen assemblies voted through a show of hands, Marcos seized emergency powers giving him full control of the Philippines' military and the authority to suppress and abolish the freedom of speech, the freedom of the press, and many other civil liberties.

President Marcos also dissolved the Philippine Congress and shut down media establishments critical of the Marcos Administration. He also ordered the immediate arrest of his political opponents and critics. Among those arrested were Senate President Jovito Salonga, and the leaders Senator Jose W. Diokno and Senator Ninoy Aquino— whom Marcos sent to Laur, Nueva Ecija – and the man who was groomed by the opposition to succeed President Marcos after the 1973 elections.

A constitutional convention, which had been called for in 1970 to replace the Commonwealth-era 1935 Constitution, continued the work of framing a new constitution after the declaration of martial law. The new constitution went into effect in early 1973, changing the form of government from presidential to parliamentary and allowing President Marcos to stay in power beyond 1973. The constitution was approved by 95% of the voters in the Philippine constitutional plebiscite. The constitution was part of the landmark Javellana v. Executive Secretary case (G.R. No. 36142) that led to the resignation of Chief Justice Roberto Concepcion. Part of the plot of the regime involved legitimizing the military rule through the new constitution providing legislative and executive powers to the president. Simultaneously Marcos conducted the 1973 plebiscite through the simple counting of hands raised by children and adults that involved questions such as the option for more rice in lieu of constitutional affirmation.

With practically all of his political opponents arrested, out of office, and in exile, President Marcos's pre-emptive declaration of martial law in 1972 and the ratification of his new constitution by more than 95% of voters enabled Marcos to effectively legitimize his government and hold on to power for another 14 years beyond his first two terms as president. In a Cold War context, Marcos retained the support of the United States through Marcos's promise to stamp out communism in the Philippines and by assuring the United States of its continued use of military and naval bases in the Philippines.

On November 27, 1977, a military tribunal sentenced Aquino and two co-accused, NPA leaders Bernabe Buscayno (Commander Dante) and Lt. Victor Corpuz, to death by firing squad. In 1978, while still the last opposition leader yet to be released from prison at Fort Bonifacio, Aquino founded his political party, Lakas ng Bayan (abbreviated "LABAN"; English: People's Power) to run for office in the Interim Batasang Pambansa (Parliament). All LABAN candidates lost, including Aquino himself. He appeared in a television interview with Ronnie Nathanielsz to freely criticize the regime during the campaign. In 1980, Ninoy Aquino suffered a heart attack, and was compassionately released from prison to undergo a heart bypass surgery in the United States. Aquino stayed with his wife Corazon, and children in Boston College as a fellow for numerous American universities such as Harvard and the Massachusetts Institute of Technology.

=== 1980s economic collapse ===
Because the Marcos administration's spending had relied so heavily on debt since the Marcos family's first term in the 1960s, the Philippines was left vulnerable when the US economy went into recession in the third quarter of 1981, forcing the Reagan administration to increase interest rates. The Philippine government plunged further into debt and the economy began going into decline in 1981, continuing to do so by the time of the Benigno Aquino Jr. assassination in 1983. By the end of that year, the economy contracted by 6.8%.

The economic and political instability combined to produce the worst recession in Philippine history in 1984 and 1985, with the economy contracting by 7.3% for two successive years.

=== Aquino assassination ===
Despite threats from First Lady Imelda Marcos, Ninoy Aquino was determined to return home, saying that "the Filipino is worth dying for". After failing to apply for a passport in Washington and New York, Ninoy got two passports with the help of Rashid Lucman – one bearing his real name, and the other with the alias Marcial Bonifacio. (Note: The first name Marcial refers to martial law, and the last name Bonifacio alludes to Fort Bonifacio, where Ninoy was imprisoned.)

On August 21, 1983, after three years in exile, Aquino was assassinated (likely by Marcos) as he disembarked from a China Airlines plane at Manila International Airport (later renamed in Aquino's honor). His assassination shocked and outraged most Filipinos, who had lost confidence in the Marcoses. The event led to more suspicions about the government, triggering non-cooperation among Filipinos that eventually led to outright civil disobedience. It also shook the Marcos administration, which was by then deteriorating due in part to Marcos's blatant illness (which turned out to be the fatal lupus erythematosus).

In 1984, Marcos appointed a commission, first led by Chief Justice Enrique Fernando and later Corazon Agrava, to launch an investigation into Aquino's assassination. Despite the commission's conclusions, Cardinal Jaime Sin, the Archbishop of Manila, declined an offer to join the commission and rejected the government's views on the assassination.

=== Formation of coalesced opposition ===
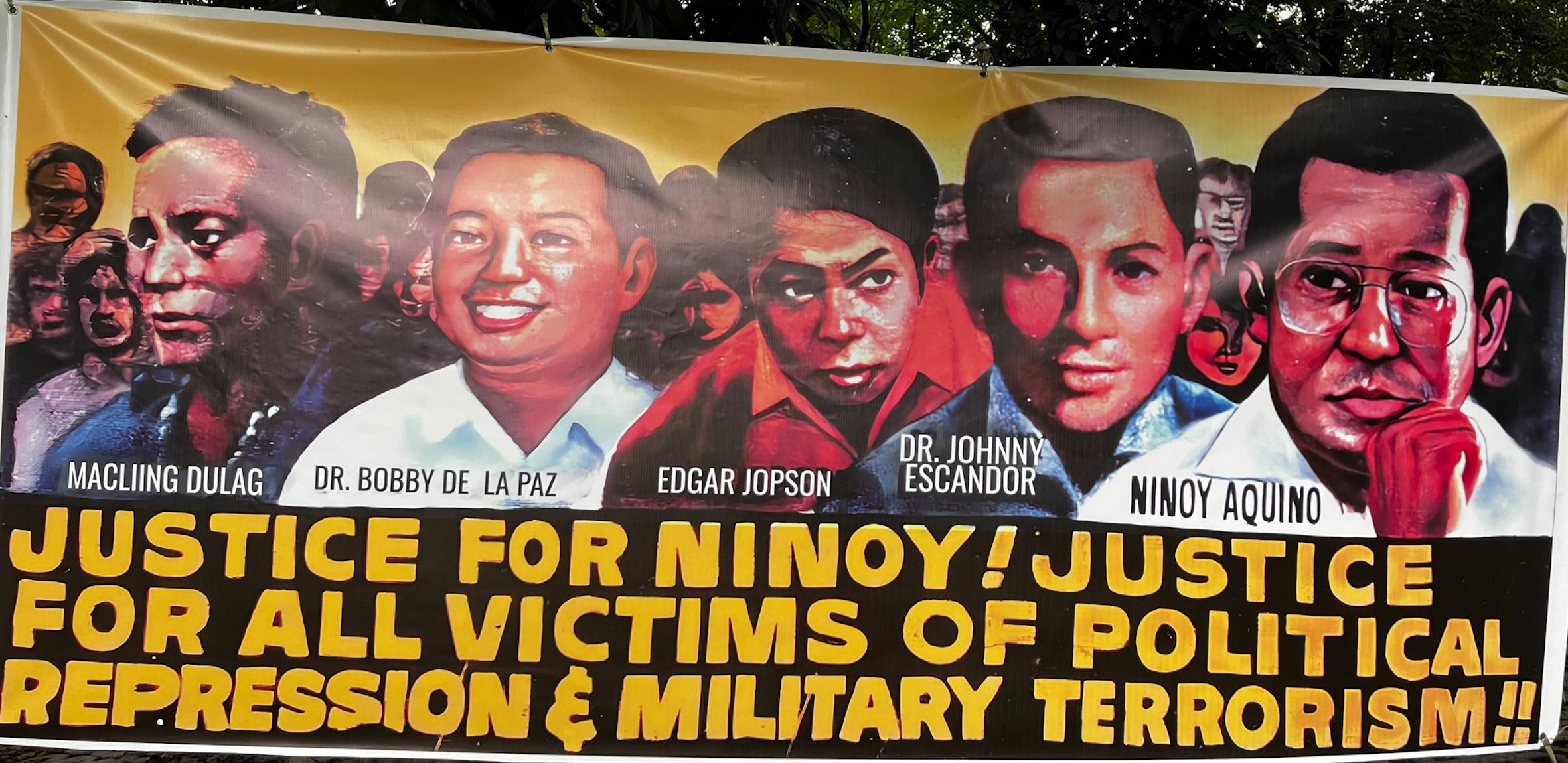
Justice for Aquino, Justice for All or JAJA, founded by Sen. Diokno's group KAAKBAY unveiled this mural on August 31, 1983, the day of Ninoy Aquino's funeral.

This began a period of coalitions, first led by the nationalist liberal democrats under Jose W. Diokno called Kilusan sa Kapangyarihan at Karapatan ng Bayan or KAAKBAY, an umbrella organization founded in 1983, which headed the first grand liberal coalition called JAJA, or the JAJA, or the Justice for Aquino, Justice for All movement. JAJA consisted of organizations such as the social democrat-based August Twenty One Movement (ATOM) led by Butz Aquino, KAAKBAY, MABINI, the Makati-based Alliance of Makati Associations or AMA, and others.

This was before the division of the center-left and national democratic/Marxist left, when the coalitions tended to pursue Diokno's philosophy of pressure politics or mass actions to influence and sway the Marcos dictatorship.

Parliamentarians of the streets, as they were called, applied pressure politics, and soon other coalitions were formed, culminating in the first call for elections for the opposition in the Kongreso ng Mamamayang Pilipino or KOMPIL. KOMPIL was organized by Aquino's ATOM from the JAJA coalition, as a means to unite the businessmen, communists, and other groups. Most of the KOMPIL members were led by the AMA leaders.

Meanwhile, Diokno, Lorenzo M. Tañada of MABINI, Butz and Corazon Aquino, and a few others were elected the overall presiding leaders in a search to find the opposition candidate. The main issue was whether to accept the CAMEL or "Call for Meaningful Elections", or, as Diokno and the more liberal JAJA members preferred, to boycott the event which might be another fixed election.

JAJA was later replaced by the Coalition of Organizations for the Restoration of Democracy (CORD) in the middle of 1984, which retained most of JAJA's features and membership. A year later CORD was replaced by Bagong Alyansang Makabayan or BAYAN, which was to be a platform for Diokno should he run for president, and was led by Tañada and student leader Lean Alejandro of the University of the Philippines. However the socialists/national democrats took control of the coalition so Diokno, Ambrosio Padilla, and the liberal democrats as well as Butz Aquino, ATOM, and the social democrats left BAYAN to the national democratic coalition that it has become in the 21st century.

==== Call for meaningful elections ====
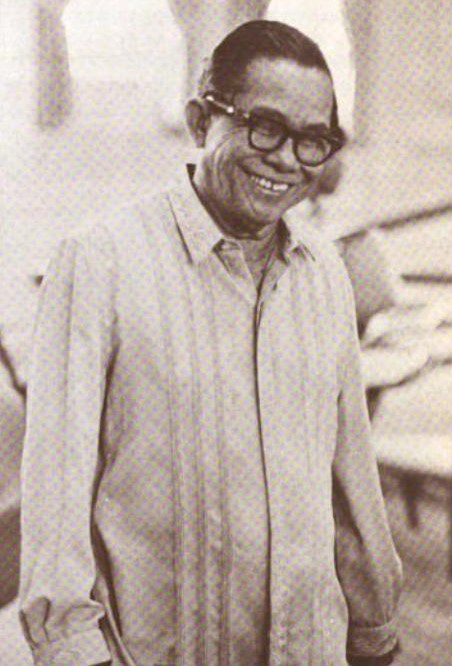
Jovito Salonga of the Liberal Party's Salonga wing, first part of the boycott movement before campaigning for the presidential nomination

Eventually the top leaders decided to convene to select a candidate in case of contingencies or any sudden announcements of changes. It was then on November 3, 1985, after pressure from the US government, that Marcos suddenly announced a snap presidential election would take place the following year, one year ahead of the regular presidential election schedule, to legitimize his control over the country. The snap election was legalized with the passage of Batas Pambansa Blg. 883 (National Law No. 883) by the Marcos-controlled unicameral congress called the Regular Batasang Pambansa.

To select a leader, the convenor's group of opposition leaders formed underlying principles. These principles, mainly proposed and edited by Diokno, discussed matters in opposition to foreign domination of the economy, especially to American intervention and military bases. After the principles were agreed upon by the opposition leaders, as Lorenzo M. Tañada quipped, it became almost automatic and completely expeditious in agreeing unanimously on one candidate to face Marcos. For the initial step in nominating a candidate, the selection process started out with a pooled list among the opposition leaders themselves. The list of candidates for president mostly included former senators: Jose W. Diokno, Butz Aquino, Jovito Salonga, Eva Estrada-Kalaw, Salvador "Doy" Laurel, Ambrosio Padilla, Aquilino Pimentel, Raul Manglapus, and Ramon Mitra Jr., as well as a future senator in Teofisto Guingona Jr., and a technocrat who once served as Marcos's executive secretary named Rafael Salas.

After the vetting of nominees, many of whom men such as Sen. Diokno vehemently opposed, the remaining potential candidates who openly wished to earn the opposition's nomination were Salonga, Laurel, and Estrada-Kalaw. United Nationalist Democratic Organization (UNIDO) members Estrada-Kalaw and Laurel were the only two not to sign the declaration of unity or the underlying principles. Eventually Estrada-Kalaw withdrew after being overwhelmed by the multiple candidates in the selection process and campaigned to become the vice-presidential candidate. Between 64-year-old Salonga, who with 64-year-old Estrada-Kalaw represented the two largest Liberal Party factions, and Laurel, who was son of former president Jose P. Laurel, it was decided by men such as Chino Roces that both candidates might lack the popularity needed to win. This was because Salonga had spent much time in exile in the United States while Laurel, the founder and main head of UNIDO, was deemed "too lightweight".

UNIDO and the other coalitions agreed to choose Aquino's wife Cory Aquino instead of Doy Laurel or Estrada-Kalaw and began the Cory Aquino for President Movement or CAPM, led by Roces, et al. Only Laurel, a friend of Ninoy Aquino, did not agree with this choice and wanted to run against Aquino and Marcos. UNIDO overwhelmed Laurel's vote and encouraged him to become Cory Aquino's vice-president instead. Once Cory Aquino became the main candidate, Laurel eventually ran as Cory Aquino's running mate for vice-president under the United Opposition (UNIDO) party. Marcos ran for re-election, with Arturo Tolentino as his running mate under the Kilusang Bagong Lipunan (KBL) party. Thus within a matter of only a few weeks the candidates were fixed and the campaign period was set for the 1986 snap election.

=== 1986 election ===
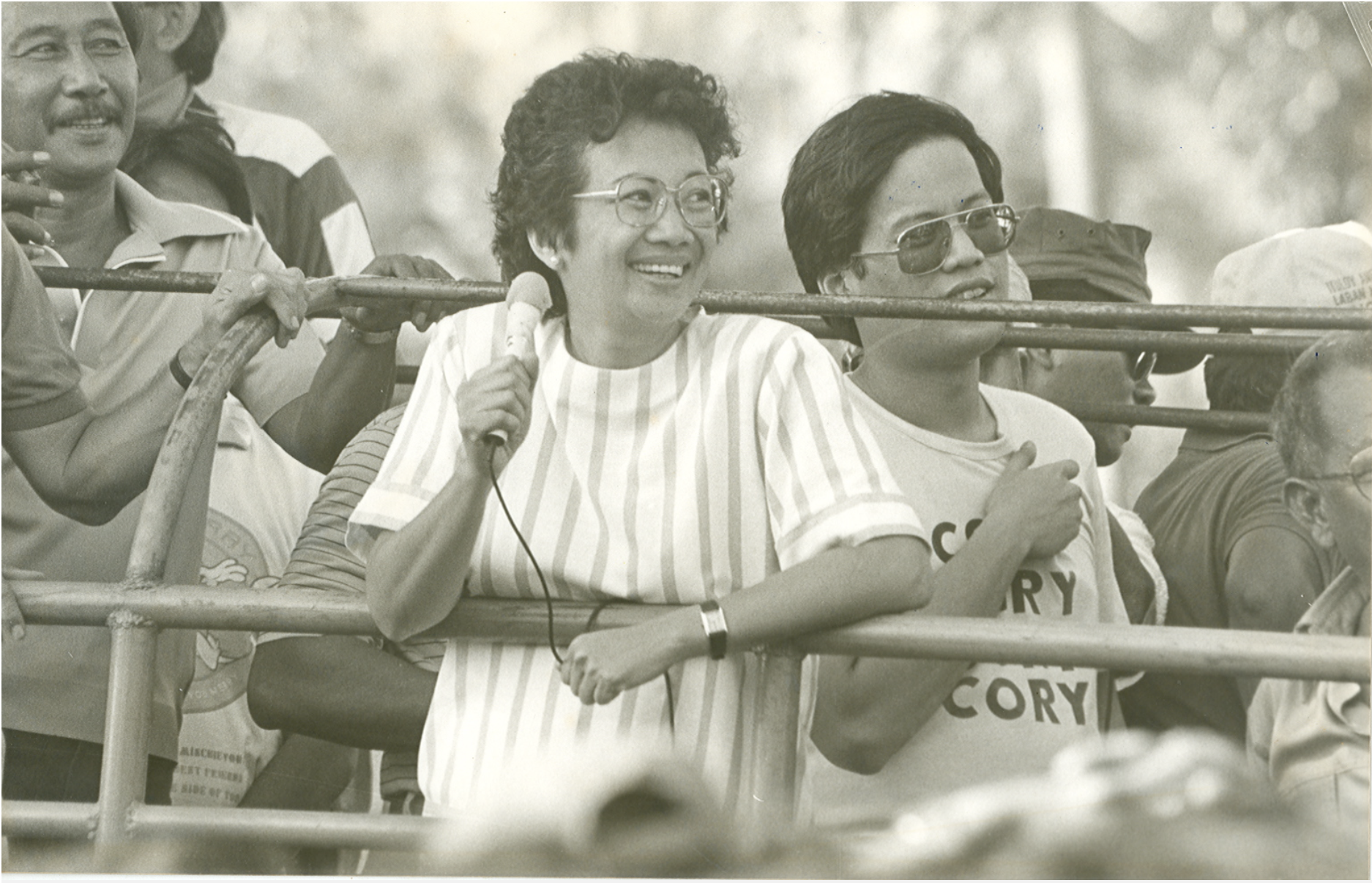
Corazon Aquino campaigning with son Noynoy

The election was held on February 7, 1986. The official election canvasser, the Commission on Elections (COMELEC), declared that Marcos was the winner. The final tally of the COMELEC had Marcos winning with 10,807,197 votes against Aquino's 9,291,761 votes. On the other hand, based on returns of 70% of the precincts of the National Movement for Free Elections (NAMFREL), an accredited poll watcher, had Aquino winning with 7,835,070 votes against Marcos's 7,053,068 votes.

This electoral exercise was marred by widespread reports of violence and tampering of election results, culminating in the walkout of 30 COMELEC computer technicians to protest the deliberate manipulation of the official election results to favor Ferdinand Marcos. The walkout was considered one of the early "sparks" of the People Power Revolution. The walkout also served as an affirmation to allegations of vote-buying, fraud, and tampering of election results by the KBL.

Because of reports of alleged fraud, the Catholic Bishops' Conference of the Philippines (CBCP) through Cardinal Ricardo Vidal issued a statement condemning the elections. The United States Senate also passed a resolution stating the same condemnation. President Ronald Reagan issued a statement calling the fraud reports as "disturbing" but he said that there was fraud "on both sides" of the Philippine election. In response to the protests, COMELEC claimed that Marcos with 53 percent won over Aquino. However, NAMFREL countered that the latter won over Marcos with 52 percent of votes.

On February 15, Marcos was proclaimed by COMELEC and Batasang Pambansa as the winner amid the controversy. All 50 opposition members of the Parliament walked out in protest. The Filipino people repudiated the results, asserting that Aquino was the real victor. Both "winners" took their oath of office in two different places, with Aquino gaining greater mass support. Aquino also called for coordinated strikes and mass boycott of the media and businesses owned by Marcos's cronies. As a result, the crony banks, corporations, and media were hit hard, and their shares in the stock market plummeted to record levels.

=== Vidal's declaration ===
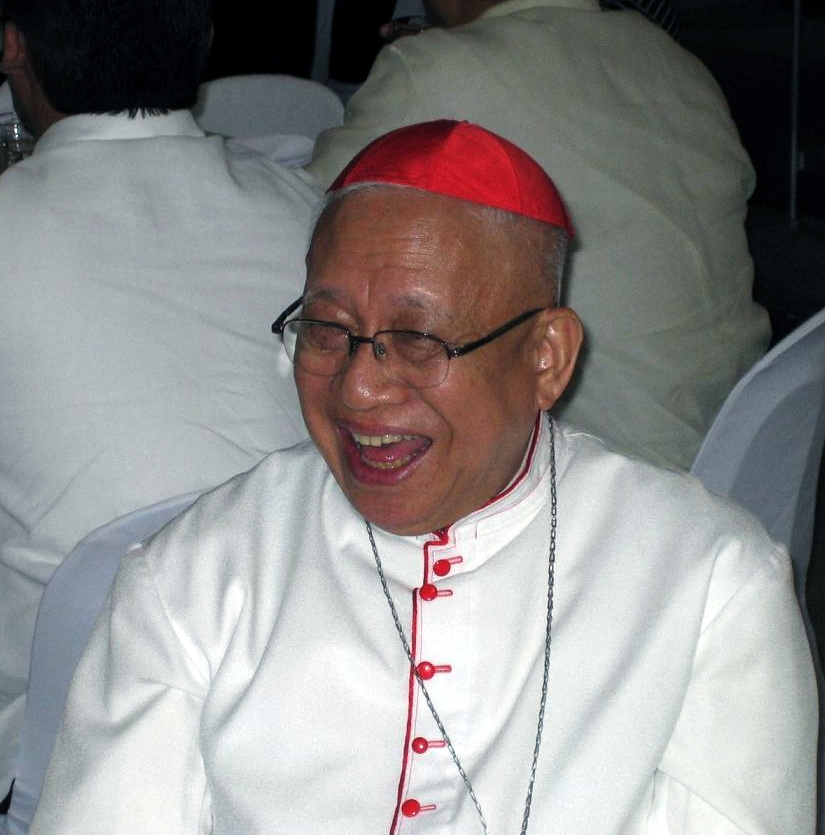
Cardinal Ricardo Vidal

On February 13, Cebu Archbishop Cardinal Ricardo Vidal issued a declaration on behalf of the Philippine Church hierarchy stating that when "a government does not of itself freely correct the evil it has inflicted on the people then it is our serious moral obligation as a people to make it do so." The declaration also asked "every loyal member of the Church, every community of the faithful, to form their judgment about the February 7 polls" and told all the Filipinos, "Now is the time to speak up. Now is the time to repair the wrong. The wrong was systematically organized. So must its correction be. But as in the election itself, that depends fully on the people; on what they are willing and ready to do."

== Events ==
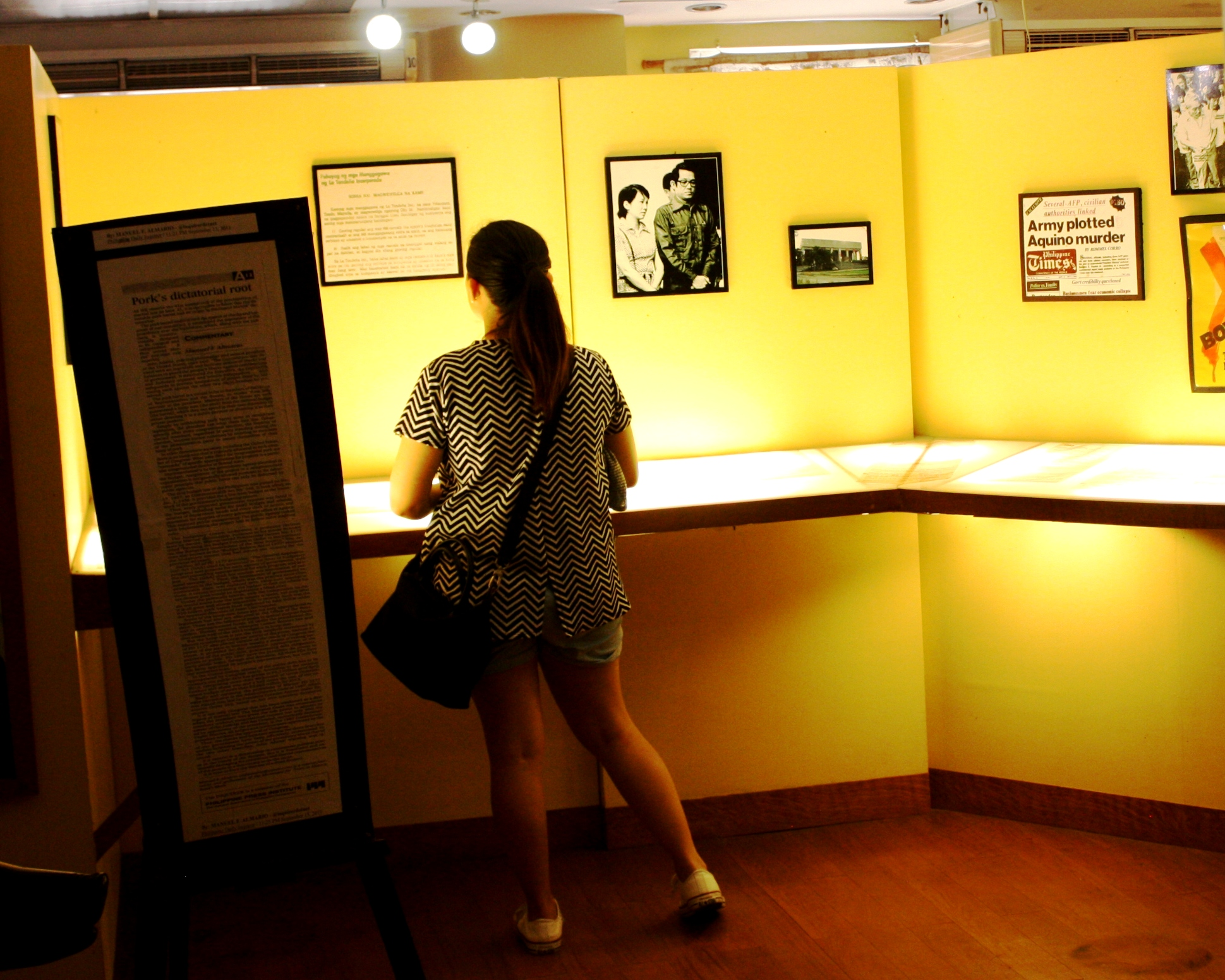
A visitor at Bantayog ng mga Bayani browses through a timeline of the last moments of the protests that culminated in People Power.

=== February 16 ===
==== Civil disobedience and boycott campaign launch ====
On February 16, 1986, Corazon Aquino held the "Tagumpay ng Bayan" (People's Victory) rally at Luneta Park. The event was attended by a crowd of about two million people.

In her speech during the event, Aquino announced a nonviolent civil disobedience campaign and called for her supporters to boycott publications and companies which were associated with Marcos or any of his cronies.

Among the companies identified in the boycott were the Manila Electric Company (MERALCO), San Miguel Corporation, Rustan Marketing Corporation, Coca-Cola Bottlers Philippines, the various crony newspapers, most notably the Bulletin Today, seven banks owned by Marcos cronies, including the Philippine National Bank and Security Bank, and even multinational companies who did business with the various Marcos cronies. The boycott was widely supported, with citizens refusing to pay their electrical bills, restaurants refusing to serve San Miguel Beer or Coca-Cola products, and even large companies such as Nestlé supported the boycott by pulling their advertisements from the Manila Bulletin and various state-owned radio and television stations. A total of ₱1.78 billion was withdrawn from the crony banks.

Aquino's camp began making preparations for more rallies, and Aquino herself went to Cebu City to rally more people to their cause.

=== February 22 ===
==== Aborted military coup ====
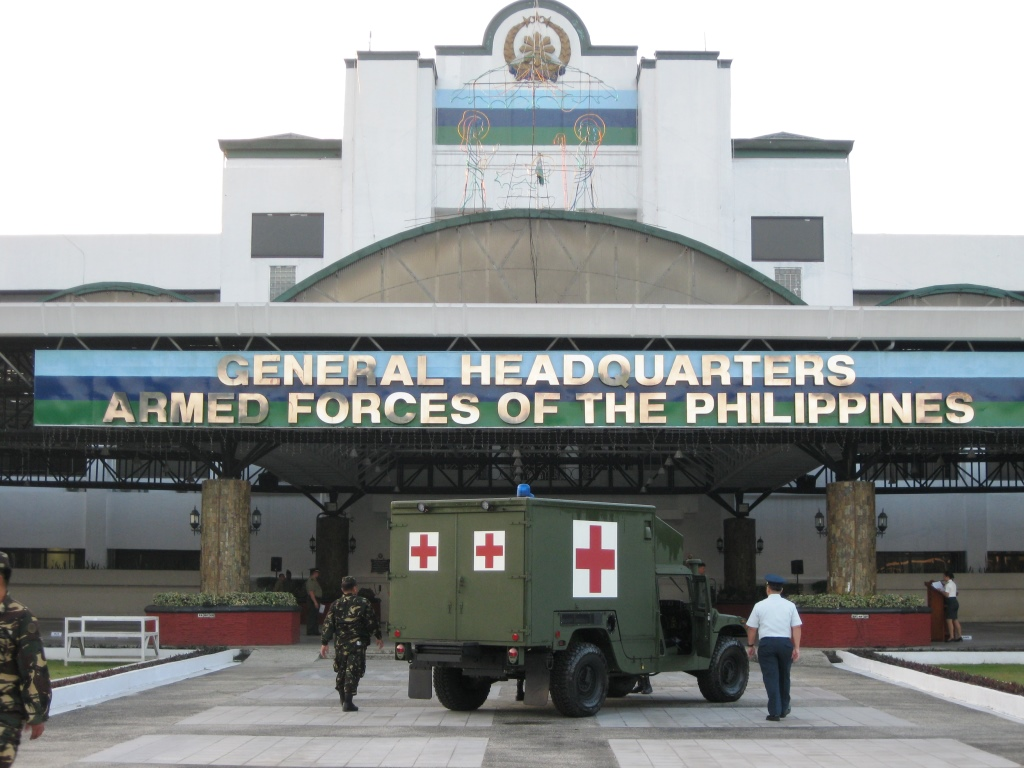
Camp Aguinaldo

In the aftermath of the election and the revelations of irregularities, the Reform the Armed Forces Movement (RAM) – a cabal of officers of the Armed Forces of the Philippines (AFP) disgruntled by the patronage politics and corruption in the AFP, formed in 1982 – set into motion a coup attempt against Ferdinand and Imelda Marcos.

RAM's initial plan was for a team to assault Malacañang Palace and arrest Ferdinand Marcos. RAM founder Col. Gringo Honasan formulated a plan to attack the palace and "neutralize" the Marcos couple. Other military units would take over key strategic facilities, such as the airport, military bases, the GHQAFP in Camp Aguinaldo, and major highway junctions to restrict counteroffensives by Marcos-loyal troops.

On February 20, members of the RAM also approached Cory Aquino, informed her of the coup plans and informed her that they would form a junta headed by a Council of Elders composed of Enrile, Ramos, Cardinal Sin, Jaime Ongpin, Alejandro Melchor, and Doy Laurel. Mrs. Aquino rejected the offer, as there was a sense that the council would just be a front for a military junta headed by Enrile.

On the morning of February 21, General Ver conducted a conference with Commandant of the Philippine Marines, Brigadier General Artemio Tadiar at the Naval Intelligence Compound in Fort Bonifacio. Gen. Ver informed BGen. Tadiar of the brewing coup plot by Enrile and an assassination attempt on the latter as well as the Philippine Navy Flag-Officer-in-Command (FOIC), Rear Admiral Brilliante Ochoco. BGen. Tadiar placed Fort Bonifacio Naval Station on alert and ordered Captain Ariel Querubin to look into the plot. Capt. Querubin confirmed the information with the Marines Military Police, headed by Capt. Benjamin Dolorfino and Naval Operations Officer Capt. Pablo Ong, that there were augmented personnel from the Ministry of Defense inside Fort Bonifacio the next two nights.

As night came, Capt. Querubin along with Lieutenant Alexander Balutan encountered the 19 personnel who were conducting "night training exercises" under the command of LtJG. Michael Angelo Asperin. The men were part of the security detail of Minister Roberto Ongpin. Capt. Querubin was then ordered by Colonel Guillermo Ruiz to fulfill Malacañang's request that the night runners be shipped off to El Fraile Island at the mouth of Manila Bay. Capt. Querubin instead took the men to the PMC Firing Range, and upon interrogation found out that their mission was to secure BGen. Tadiar and RAdm. Ochoco to neutralize their command during the coup.

The following morning, Minister Ongpin phoned Enrile who was at The Atrium in Makati, asking for the whereabouts of his security staff. Since three of the men arrested were on loan from the Ministry of Defense, Enrile was worried that the fingers would be pointed towards him. Meanwhile, Col. Honasan and his staff at the MND Building in Camp Aguinaldo, after monitoring troop movements overnight, found out that the 5th Marine Battalion Landing Team from Fort Bonifacio was moved to Pandacan, and the 1th Infantry Battalion from Nueva Ecija was moved to the North Harbor early morning. This would translate to an unusual amount of troops within Metro Manila, and it seemed that Gen. Ver was already taking actions to protect Malacanang.

However, after Marcos learned about the plot, he ordered their leaders' arrest, and presented to the international and local press some of the captured plotters, Majors Saulito Aromin and Edgardo Doromal. Threatened with their impending imprisonment, Defense Minister Juan Ponce Enrile and his fellow coup plotters decided to ask for help from then-AFP Vice Chief of Staff Lt. Gen. Fidel V. Ramos, who was also the chief of the Philippine Constabulary (now the Philippine National Police). Ramos agreed to resign from his position and support the plotters. Ramos also contacted the highly influential Cardinal Archbishop of Manila Jaime Sin for his support. Despite Ramos' defection, however, the coup plotters were essentially trapped in Camp Crame, and in the words of historian Vicente L. Rafael, "became sitting ducks for Ferdinand Marcos' loyalist forces."

At about 6:30 p.m. on February 22, Enrile and Ramos held a press conference at the Ministry of National Defense building in Camp Aguinaldo, the AFP headquarters, where they announced that they had resigned from their positions in Marcos' cabinet and were withdrawing support from his government. Marcos himself later conducted a news conference calling on Enrile and Ramos to surrender, urging them to "stop this stupidity". Marcos tried to call Enrile, but Enrile refused to play Marcos's game. Eventually out of desperation Marcos televised his sickly appearance, and announced that he promised to crush every Filipino who stood in his way in order to capture Enrile and Ramos.

==== Appeals by Butz Aquino and Cardinal Sin ====
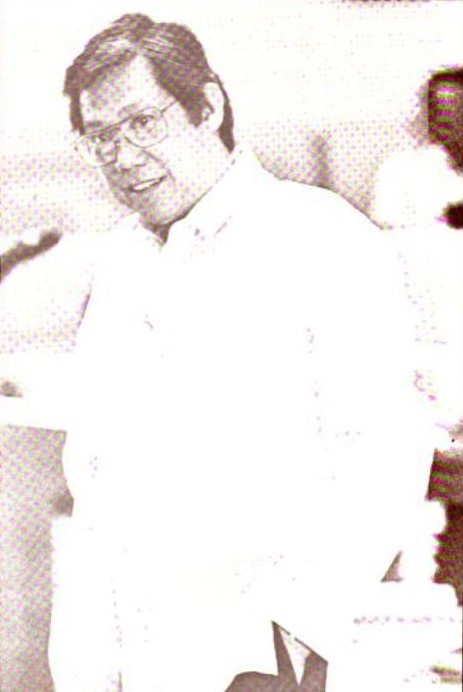
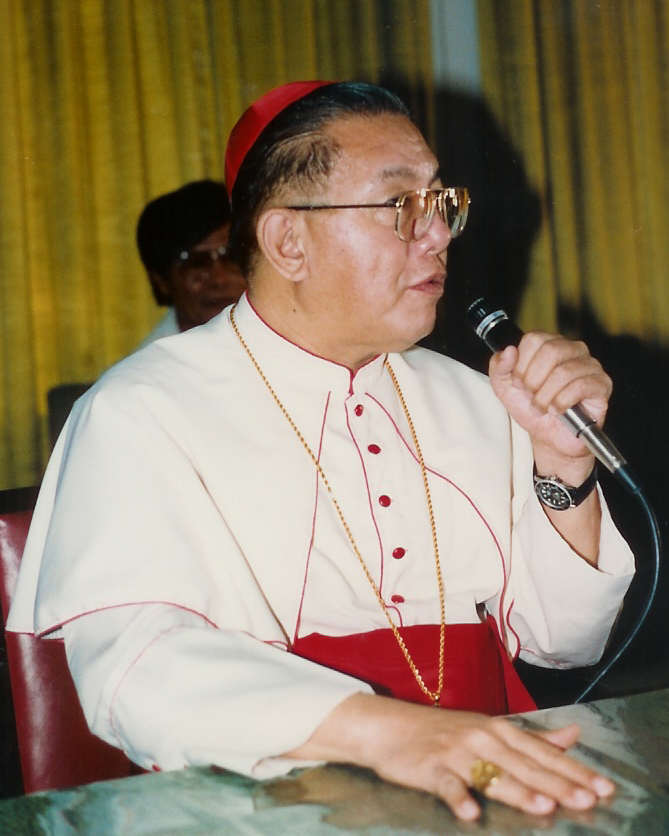
Butz Aquino (left) and Cardinal Jaime Sin (right) issued separate exhortations to the public through Radio Veritas that have since been credited with initiating the revolution.

On the evening of February 22, after receiving confirmation of Enrile and Ramos' defection from Quezon City assemblywoman Cecilia Muñoz-Palma, activist and former actor Butz Aquino proceeded to Camp Aguinaldo to attend their second press conference. Upon offering his assistance to the two, Enrile answered: "We need all the support we can get." After the conference, Aquino asked permission from Radio Veritas reporter Jun Taña to speak on the air through telephone, upon which he issued a call-to-action for the public, including his "friends in ATOM, BANDILA and FSDM", to gather at the Isetann department store on Aurora Boulevard in Cubao, Quezon City, and begin a march southward to Camp Aguinaldo.

Some minutes after Aquino's statement, Cardinal Jaime Sin, the 30th Archbishop of Manila, went on Radio Veritas and issued another call-to-action, exhorting Filipinos to aid Enrile and Ramos by going to the section of EDSA between Camp Crame and Aguinaldo and giving them emotional support, food and other supplies. For many, this seemed an unwise decision since civilians would not stand a chance against a dispersal by government troops. Many people, especially priests and nuns, still trooped to EDSA.

My Dear People, I wish you to pray, because it's only through prayer that we may solve this problem. This is Cardinal Sin speaking to the people, especially in Metro Manila. I am indeed concerned about the situation of Minister Enrile and General Ramos, I am calling our people to support our two good friends at the camp. If any of you could be around at Camp Aguinaldo to show your solidarity and your support in this very crucial period, when our two good friends have shown their idealism, I would be very happy if you support them now. I would only wish that violence and bloodshed be avoided. Let us pray to our blessed lady to help us in order that we can solve this problem peacefully

— Cardinal Jaime Sin

Radio Veritas played a critical role during the mass uprising. Former University of the Philippines president Francisco Nemenzo stated that: "Without Radio Veritas, it would have been difficult, if not impossible, to mobilize millions of people in a matter of hours." Similarly, a certain account in the event said that: "Radio Veritas, in fact, was our umbilical cord to whatever else was going on."

=== February 23 ===
==== Rising mass support ====
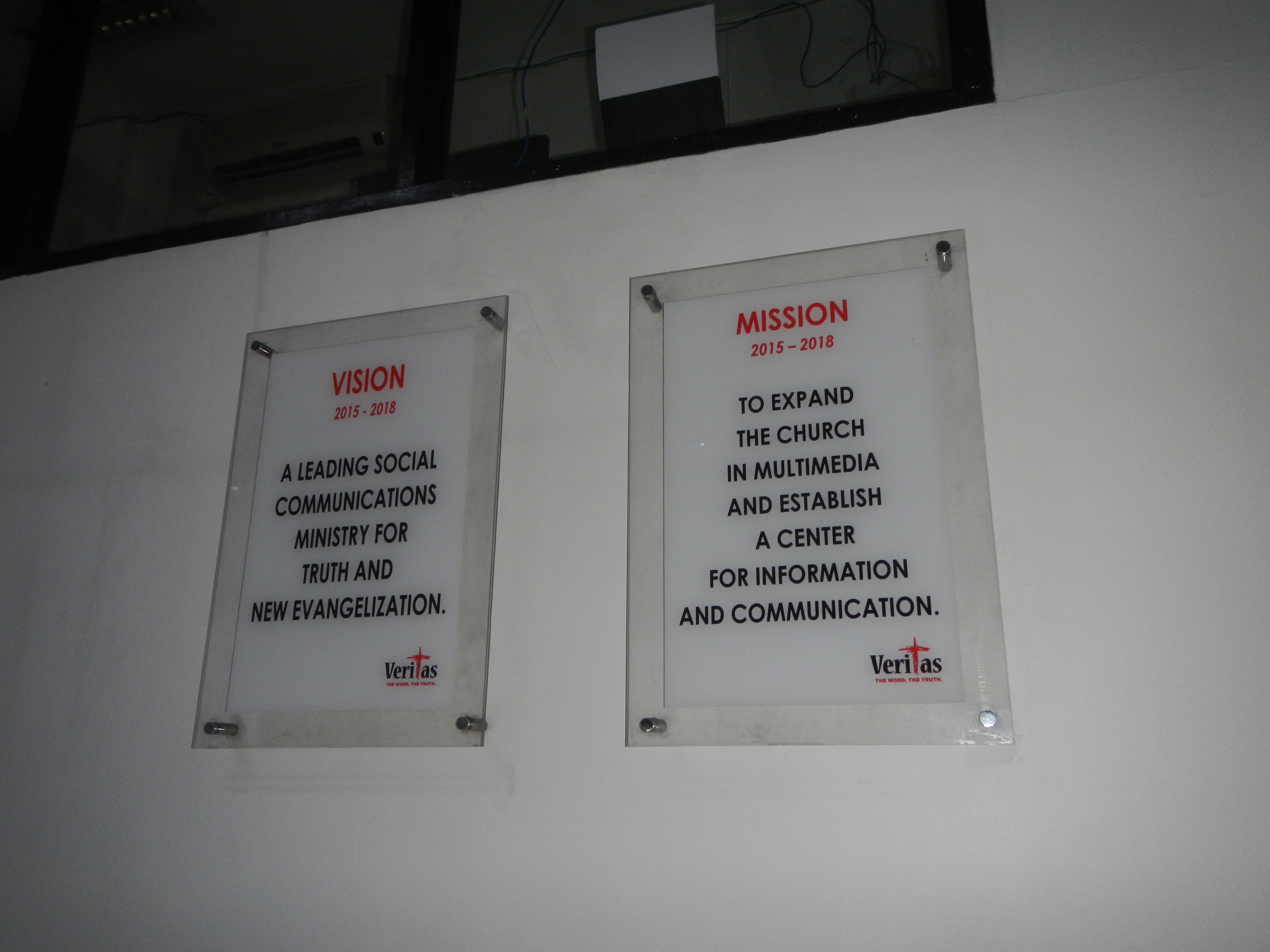
Radio Veritas

At dawn, Sunday, government troops arrived at Radio Veritas and destroyed its main 50-kilowatt transmitter, cutting off broadcasts to people in the nearby provinces. The station switched to a 10-kilowatt standby transmitter with a limited range of broadcast. The station was targeted because it had proven to be a valuable communications tool for the people supporting the rebels, keeping them informed of government troop movements and relaying requests for food, medicine, and supplies.

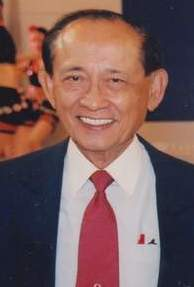
Fidel V. Ramos

Still, people came to EDSA until it swelled to hundreds of thousands of unarmed civilians. The mood in the street was very festive, with many bringing whole families. Performers entertained the crowds, nuns and priests led prayer vigils, and people set up barricades and makeshift sandbags, trees, and vehicles in several places along EDSA and intersecting streets such as Santolan and Ortigas Avenue. Everywhere, people listened to Radio Veritas on their radios. A photo taken by Pete Reyes of Srs. Porferia Ocariza and Teresita Burias leading the rosary in front of soldiers has since become an iconic picture of the revolution. Several groups sang Bayan Ko (My Homeland), which, since 1980, had become a patriotic anthem of the opposition. People frequently flashed the 'LABAN' sign, which is an "L" formed with their thumb and index finger. 'laban' is the Filipino word for 'fight', but also the abbreviation of Lakas ng Bayan, Ninoy Aquino's party. After lunch on February 23, Enrile and Ramos decided to consolidate their positions. Enrile crossed EDSA from Camp Aguinaldo to Camp Crame amidst cheers from the crowd.

In the mid-afternoon, Radio Veritas relayed reports of Marines massing near the camps in the east and LVT-5 tanks approaching from the north and south. A contingent of Marines with tanks and armored vans, led by Brigadier General Artemio Tadiar, was stopped along Ortigas Avenue, about 2 kilometers (1.2 mi) from the camps, by tens of thousands of people. Nuns holding rosaries knelt in front of the tanks and men and women linked arms together to block the troops. Tadiar asked the crowds to make a clearing for them, but they did not budge. In the end, the troops retreated with no shots fired.

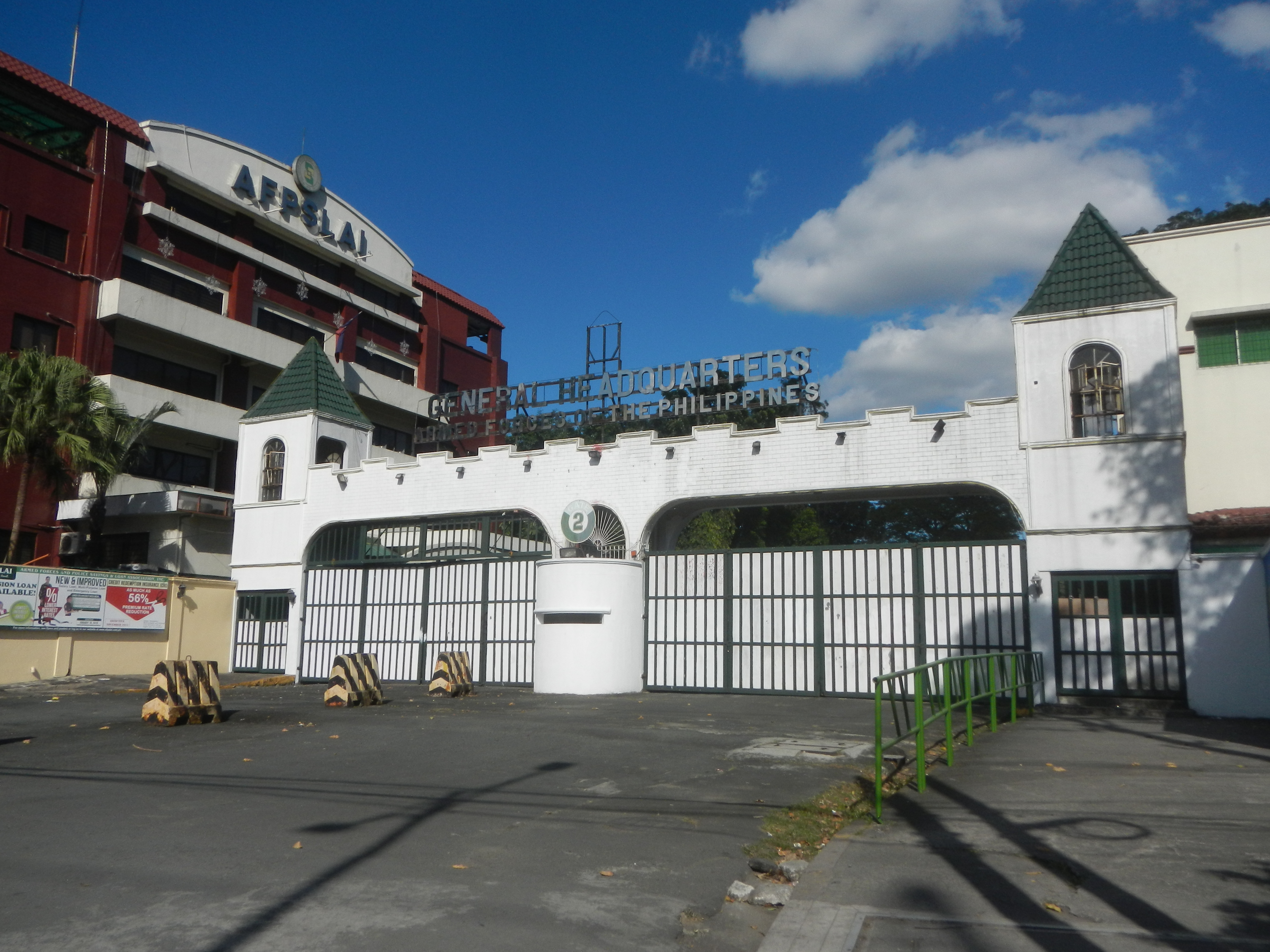
Gate 2 of Camp Aguinaldo in 2017.

By evening, the standby transmitter of Radio Veritas failed, although the stations of the Far East Broadcasting Company also took up the task of broadcasting information to the crowds, calling them in particular to protect Gate 2 of Camp Aguinaldo. Shortly after midnight, the Radio Veritas staff led by Father James Reuter were able to move to the transmitter of DZRJ-AM so they could begin broadcasting again. To help keep their location a secret, they took up the moniker "Radyo Bandido" (Bandit Radio) as a callsign. June Keithley, with her husband Angelo Castro Jr., was the radio broadcaster who continued Radio Veritas' program throughout the night and in the ensuing days.

=== February 24 ===
==== The Sotelo landing ====
In the early morning hours of February 24, helicopters manned by the 15th Strike Wing of the Philippine Air Force, led by Colonel Antonio Sotelo, were ordered from Sangley Point in Cavite, south of Manila, to head to Camp Crame. Secretly, the squadron had already defected and instead of attacking Camp Crame, landed in it with the crowds cheering and hugging the pilots and crew members in response to what has been referred to as the "Sotelo landing," considered a key turning point where the military circumstances turned against Marcos.

A Bell 214 helicopter piloted by Major Deo Cruz of the 205th Helicopter Wing and Sikorsky S-76 gunships piloted by Colonel Charles Hotchkiss of the 20th Air Commando Squadron joined the rebel squadron earlier in the air. The presence of the helicopters boosted the morale of Enrile and Ramos who had been continually encouraging their fellow soldiers to join the opposition movement. In the afternoon, Aquino arrived at the base where Enrile, Ramos, Reform the Armed Forces Movement (RAM) officers, and a throng were waiting.

==== Marcos departure rumor ====
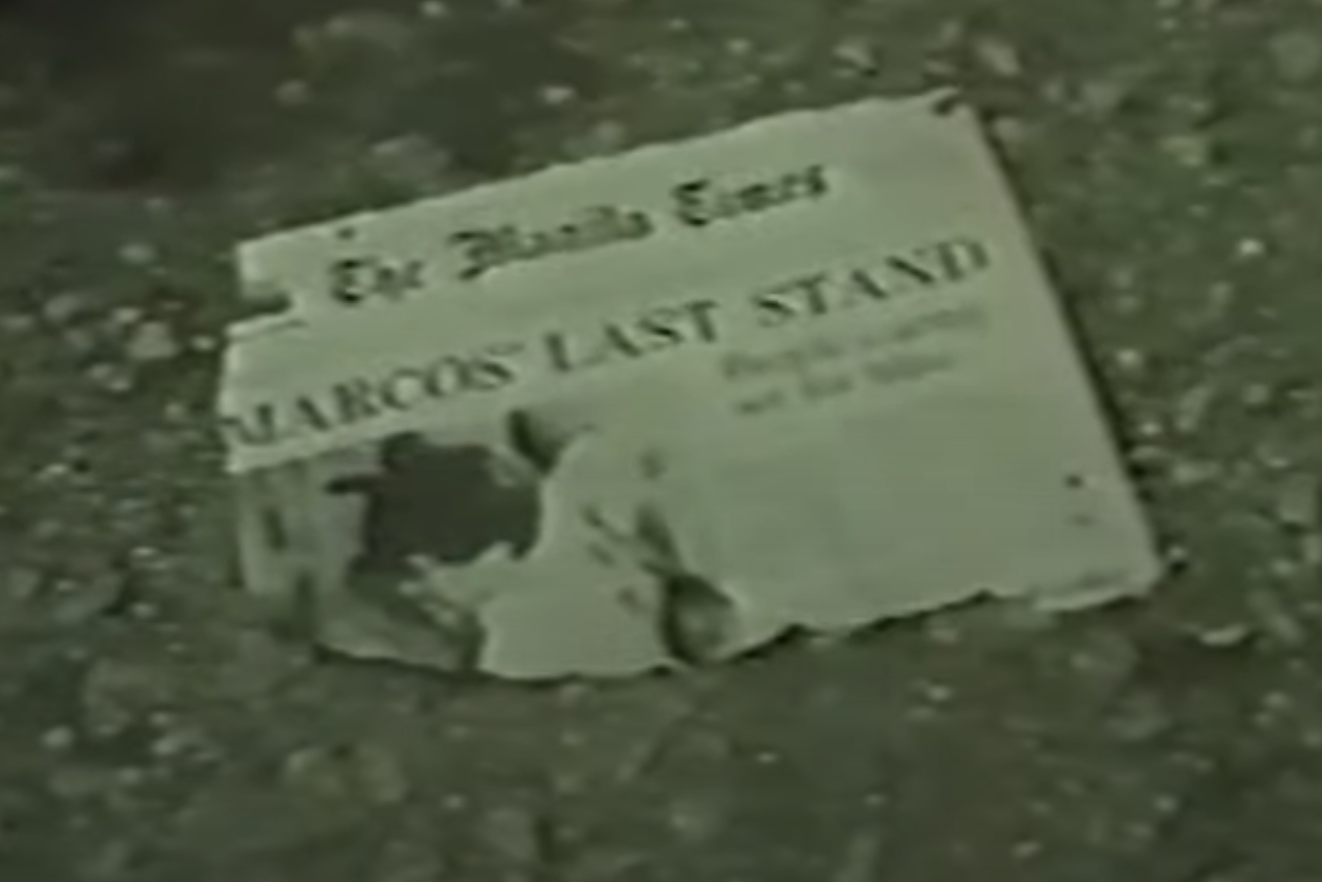
A damaged newspaper from The Manila Times covering the revolution

Around 6:30, June Keithley received reports that Marcos had left Malacañang Palace and broadcast this to the people at EDSA. The crowd celebrated and even Ramos and Enrile came out from Crame to appear to the crowds. This would be disproven when Marcos went on MBS 4 a few hours later, so it was later speculated that the false report was a calculated move against Marcos to encourage more defections.

==== Fourth Marine brigade refusal of "Kill Order" ====
At dawn on Monday, February 24, Marines marching from Libis towards the east of Camp Aguinaldo lobbed tear gas at the demonstrators, who quickly dispersed. By 8:30 a.m., some 3,000 Marines entered and held the east side of Camp Aguinaldo, and the Fourth Marine brigade under the command of Colonel Braulio Balbas positioned howitzers and mortars to strike against Camp Crame.

Despite the fact that civilians would be killed in such an attack, General Josephus Ramas gave the "kill order" against Camp Crame at around 9 AM. Although the artillery was ready to fire, Balbas stalled, telling Ramas that they were "still looking for maps." Ramas then told Balbas that "The President is on the other line waiting for compliance!" Ramas repeated his orders to Balbas at 9:20, to which Balbas replied they were "still positioning the cannons." Balbas would eventually refuse to follow Ramas' orders each of the four times he was ordered to fire on Camp Crame, leading historians to point to this moment as the point at which Marcos lost control of the Philippine Marine Corps.

==== Marcos TV appearance on MBS 4 ====
The jubilation resulting from the rumor that Marcos had fled was short-lived, as Marcos appeared on television on the government-controlled MBS-4 at around 9:00, (using the foreclosed ABS-CBN facilities, transmitter and compound in Broadcast Plaza, now ABS-CBN Broadcasting Center) declaring that he would not step down.

===== Lifting of Maximum Tolerance policy =====
During the broadcast, Marcos announced that he had lifted the policy of "Maximum Tolerance" which that government had previously put in place. This gave armed forces permission to use force to defend government installations, as well as communications facilities, from Enrile and Ramos' forces. In addition, he told radio and TV stations not to broadcast news about military movements without permission – which was exactly what Radyo Bandido had been doing.

===== Marcos orders not to attack via airstrike =====
"My order is not to attack" (DZRH version)
President Ferdinand Marcos and Gen. Ver during a press conference in Malacañang Palace.

PTV4 Version
Recorded by the People's Television Network (owned by the Presidential Communications Office)

At one point during the broadcast, General Ver approached Marcos and informed him that the AFP was ready to mount an airstrike on Camp Crame, but Marcos ordered them to halt. The actual dialogue on TV between Marcos and then AFP Chief of Staff Gen. Ver went as follows:

Fabian Ver: The Ambush there is aiming to mount there in the top. Very quickly, you must immediately leave to conquer them, immediately, Mr. President.

Ver: Just wait, come here.
Ver: Please, Your Honor, so we can immediately strike them. We have to immobilize the helicopters that they've got. We have two fighter planes flying now to strike at any time, sir.
Marcos: My order is not to attack. No, no, no! Hold on. My order is not to attack.
Ver: They are massing civilians near our troops and we cannot keep on withdrawing. You asked me to withdraw yesterday–
Marcos (interrupting): Uh yes, but ah... My order is to disperse without shooting them.
Ver: We cannot withdraw all the time...

Marcos: No! No! No! Hold on! You disperse the crowd without shooting them.

==== Capture of MBS-4 ====
At about 9:50 a.m. MBS-4 suddenly went off the air during Marcos' broadcast. A contingent of rebels, under Colonel Mariano Santiago, had captured the station. MBS-4 was put back on the air shortly after noon, with Orly Punzalan announcing on live television, "Channel 4 is on the air again to serve the people." By this time, the crowds at EDSA had grown to over a million, but some sources estimated that the crowd number went up to 2 million people.

The ensuing marathon broadcast was considered the "return" of ABS-CBN on air because this was the first time that former network employees were inside the complex after 14 years of closure since Marcos sequestered the property during the declaration of martial law in September 1972. "Radyo Bandido" ended broadcasting that afternoon, while Radio Veritas resumed transmissions, this time from the Broadcast Plaza's radio studios. Among the various personnel that appeared alongside Orly Punzalan in its first few hours were Maan Hontiveros and Dely Magpayo.

==== Attack on Villamor Airbase and further defections ====
In the late afternoon of February 24, helicopters of the 15th Strike Wing, commanded by Sotelo, attacked Villamor Airbase, destroying presidential air assets. Sotelo had radioed ahead to the pilots and crews of the air assets, telling them to stay away from the aircraft. As a result, the assets were disabled without any human casualties. Sotelo had sent another helicopter to Malacañang, where it fired a rocket on the palace grounds and caused minor damage.

Later, most of the officers who had graduated from the Philippine Military Academy (PMA) defected. The majority of the Armed Forces had already changed sides.

=== February 25 ===
==== The Bamban Barricade ====
On February 25, loyalist forces from the Army's 5th Infantry Division in Tarlac were mobilized to reinforce the units laying siege to Camp Crame. They were stopped when 20,000 people from the various towns and cities of Pampanga blocked the Bamban Bridge, preventing those reinforcements from getting through to Manila, in an event which came to be known as "the Bamban barricade."

==== Two inaugurations ====
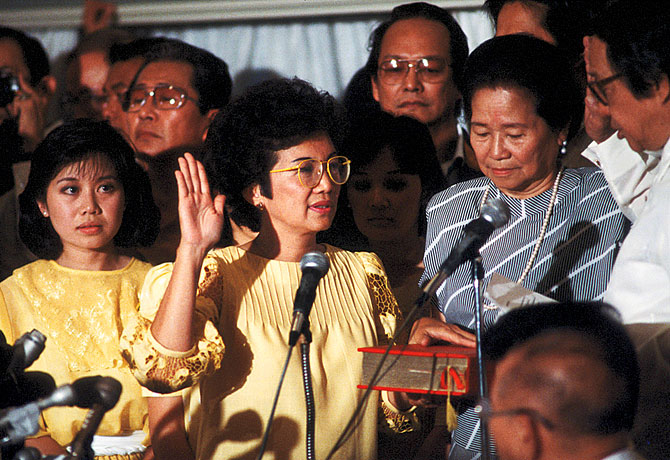
Corazon Aquino was inaugurated as the 11th president of the Philippines on February 25, 1986, at Club Filipino in San Juan

On the morning of Tuesday, February 25, around 7 a.m., a minor clash occurred between loyal government troops and the reformists. Snipers stationed atop the crony-owned RPN-9 transmitter in Panay Avenue, near MBS-4, began shooting at the reformists. Many rebel soldiers surged to the station, and a rebel S-76 helicopter later shot the snipers at the broadcast tower. The troops later left after a V-150 was blocked by a crowd that assembled.

Later in the morning, Corazon Aquino was inaugurated as President of the Philippines in a simple ceremony at Club Filipino in Greenhills, San Juan, about a kilometer from Camp Crame. She was sworn in as president by Senior Associate Justice Claudio Teehankee, and Laurel as vice-president by Justice Vicente Abad Santos. The Bible on which Aquino swore her oath was held by her mother-in-law Aurora Aquino, the mother of Ninoy Aquino. Attending the ceremonies were Ramos, who was then promoted to General, Enrile, and many politicians.

Outside Club Filipino, all the way to EDSA, hundreds of people cheered and celebrated. Bayan Ko (My Country, a popular folk song and the unofficial National Anthem of protest) was sung after Aquino's oath-taking. Many people wore yellow, the color of Aquino's presidential campaign.

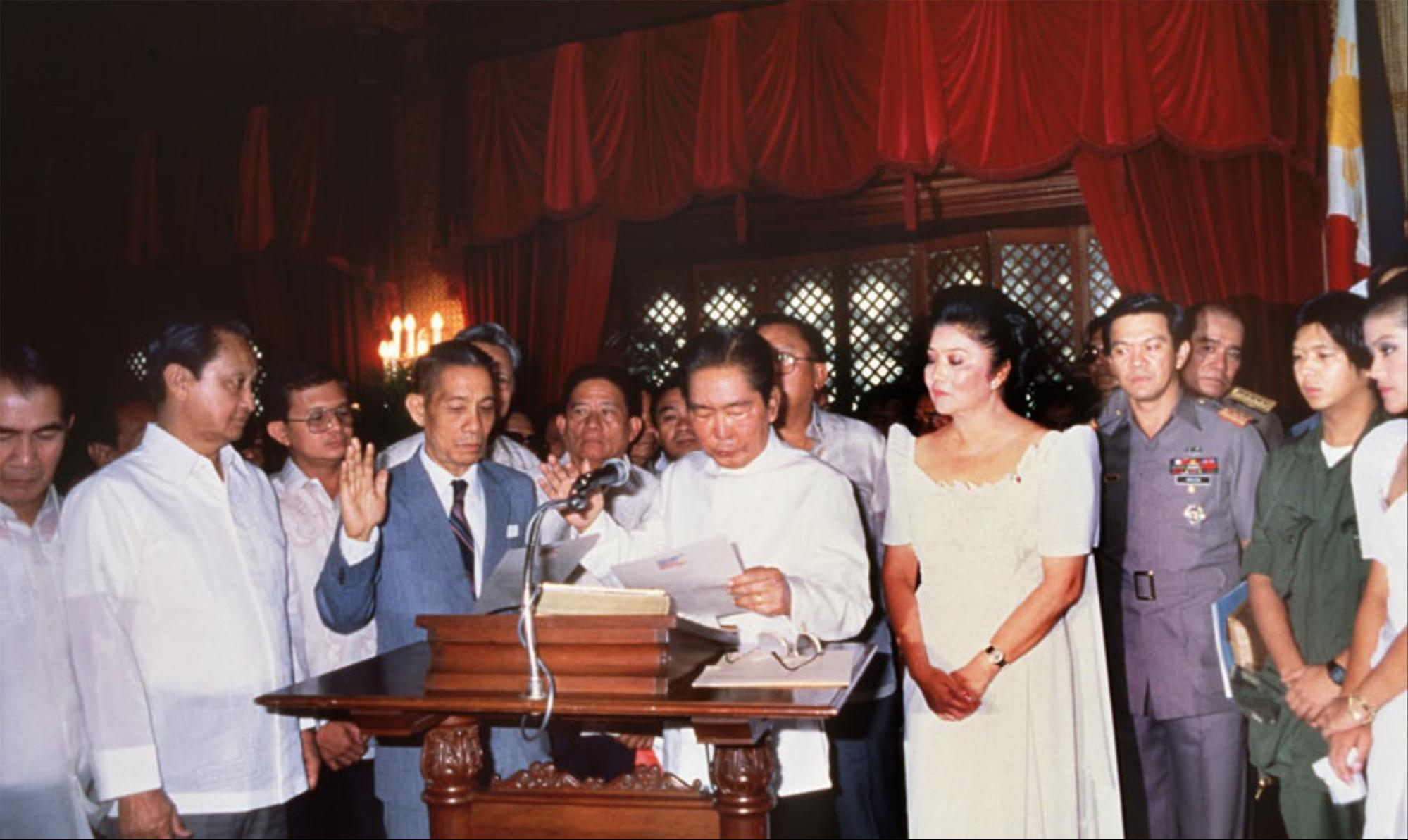
President Ferdinand E. Marcos is sworn by Chief Justice Ramon Aquino in the Ceremonial Hall of Malacañang Palace on February 25, 1986.

An hour later, Marcos held the inauguration at Malacañang Palace. Loyalist civilians attended the ceremony, shouting "Marcos, Marcos, Marcos pa rin! (Marcos, Marcos, still Marcos!)". On the Palace balcony, Marcos took the Oath of Office, aired on IBC-13 and RPN-9 (RPN-9 was going off-the-air during the broadcast of the inauguration, as its transmitter was captured by reformist soldiers) None of the invited foreign dignitaries attended the ceremony, for security reasons. The couple finally emerged on the balcony of the Palace before 3,000 KBL loyalists who were shouting, "Capture the snakes!" Rather tearfully, First Lady Imelda Marcos gave a farewell rendition of the couple's theme song – the 1938 kundiman "Dahil Sa Iyo" (Because of You) – chanting the song's entreaties in Tagalog:

Because of you, I became happy
Loving I shall offer you
If it is true I shall be enslaved by you
All of this because of you.

The broadcast of the event was interrupted as rebel troops successfully captured the other stations. It was the last time Marcos was seen in the Philippines.

By this time, hundreds of people had amassed at the barricades along Mendiola, only a hundred meters away from Malacañang. They were prevented from storming the Palace by loyal government troops securing the area. The angry demonstrators were pacified by priests who warned them not to be violent.

=== February 26 ===
==== Marcos' departure ====
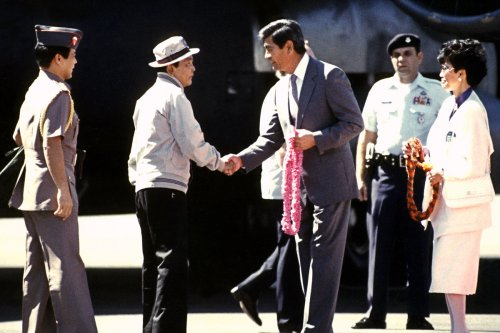
Marcos in exile in Hawaii

Despite publicly maintaining that he was still president, privately Marcos knew his position was untenable. Even as he was holding his rival inauguration, he and his family were already preparing to flee the country. At 5:00 a.m. on Tuesday morning, Marcos phoned United States Senator Paul Laxalt, asking for advice from the White House. Laxalt advised him to "cut and cut cleanly", to which Marcos expressed his disappointment after a short pause. In the afternoon, Marcos talked to Minister Enrile, asking for safe passage for him, his family, and close allies such as General Ver. He also asked Enrile if United States Ambassador Stephen Bosworth could assign a security escort for the Marcos family's departure.

Around midnight, the Marcos family boarded a United States Air Force HH-3E Rescue helicopter and flew to Clark Air Base in Angeles City 83 kilometers (52 mi) north of Manila. At Clark Air Base, Marcos asked to spend a couple of days with his family in Ilocos Norte, his native province. Aquino vetoed the request. President Reagan privately derided Aquino for denying Marcos a last look at his home province.

The deposed First Family and their servants then rode US Air Force C-9A Nightingale and C-141B Starlifter planes to Andersen Air Force Base in the north of the United States territory of Guam, then flying to Hickam Air Force Base in Hawaii where Marcos finally arrived on February 26. The United States government documented that they entered the United States with millions of dollars in jewelry, gold, stocks, and cash.

When news of the Marcos family's departure reached civilians, many rejoiced and danced in the streets. Over at Mendiola, the demonstrators stormed the Palace, which was closed to ordinary people for around a decade. Despite looting by some angry protesters, the majority wandered about inside through rooms where national history was shaped, looking at objects extravagant and mundane that the Marcos clan and its court had abandoned in their flight. Shortly after midnight on February 26, five army trucks of troops under the command of Fidel Ramos arrived in Malacañang Palace to secure it after Ferdinand Marcos had left – marking the end of the Marcos dictatorship, and placing the palace under the control of the provisional government of the Philippines until a new constitution could be enacted a year later, in 1987.

As the provisionary government took control of Malacanang Palace, and in the rush of the Marcos' family's departure, documents pertaining to overseas land holdings and bank accounts were recovered. These documents were the foundation of successive attempts to recover the Marcos family's ill-gotten wealth starting with Operation Big Bird, as well as court cases against the Marcos family and cronies.

In other countries, people also rejoiced and congratulated Filipinos they knew. CBS anchorman Bob Simon reported: "We Americans like to think we taught the Filipinos democracy. Well, tonight they are teaching the world."

=== Events outside the capital ===
While much of the historical focus regarding the People Power Revolution has been on events around the two camps and the presidential palace, Filipinos from all over the archipelago also participated in the revolution, with large protests happening in Baguio, Cebu City, Iloilo City, Cagayan de Oro and Davao City as well as prominent municipalities such as Bamban, Pampanga and Los Baños, Laguna.

==== People Power in Cebu City ====
Cebu played a particularly key role in the days leading up to the 1986 People Power Revolution and the ouster of Marcos because of Corazon Aquino and Salvador Laurel's's presence in the city during the earliest days of the revolution. It was from Fuente Osmeña Circle in Cebu City that the opposition forces relaunched a civil disobedience campaign against the Marcos regime and its cronies on February 22, 1986. After that, the Carmelite Monastery in Barangay Mabolo served as a refuge for Aquino and Laurel on the first hours of the revolution, when it was not yet safe for them to return to Manila.

==== People Power in Baguio ====
In the earliest hours of the People Power revolution, Baguio's antidictatorship organizers were based largely in the Azotea Building midway up Session Road, and in Cafe Amapola further up Session, at its intersection with Governor Pack Road. Because the United States' Armed Forces Radio and Television Network station at Camp John Hay was transmitting news from Manila, they learned early on that the People Power had begun in Manila. Deciding that their locations were too unsafe, they encamped in the courtyard of the Baguio Cathedral, which was located on higher ground. They were later joined by Lt. Benjamin Magalong, of the Philippine Constabulary detachment in Buguias, Benguet, who had defected from the government, gone to the nearby Central Police Station in Baguio, and disarmed its personnel to prevent any untoward incidents while Baguio residents continued to gather at the cathedral to protest the abuses of the Marcos administration. The Baguio Cathedral, and Session Road adjacent to it, thus became the center of the People Power revolution in Baguio – paralleling similar protests in Cebu, Davao, Bacolod, Manila, and other major Philippine cities, eventually leading to the ouster of President Ferdinand Marcos on February 25, 1986. These events were documented by filmmaker Kidlat Tahimik, who featured footage of the protest in his 1994 collage film Why Is Yellow the Middle of the Rainbow?.

==== People Power in Pampanga ====
Aside from the Bamban Barricade, Clark Air Base also played a key part in the ousting of the Marcoses, since they were flown to Clark after fleeing Malacañang and it was there that they boarded the U.S. provided plane that flew them into exile in Hawaii.

== Aftermath ==
Immediately after her accession, Aquino issued Proclamation No. 3, a provisional constitution which established a revolutionary government. The edict promulgated the 1986 Freedom Constitution, which retained or superseded various provisions of the 1973 Constitution that were in force up to that point. This allowed Aquino to wield both executive and legislative powers; among her first acts was to unilaterally abolish the Batasang Pambansa (the unicameral legislature duly elected in 1984), pending a plebiscite for a more permanent Constitution and the establishment of a new Congress by 1987.

Despite the success of the People Power Revolution, there were elements which were dissatisfied by Aquino's rise to power, including the leaders Reform the Armed Forces Movement which had launched the failed coup against Marcos and had been saved by the arrival of the civilians at EDSA. As a result, these groups launched a number of coup d'état attempts throughout Aquino's term.

The revolution had an effect on democratization movements in such countries as Taiwan and South Korea and indirectly contributed to the downfall of communism in Soviet bloc and the end of the Cold War; other effects include the restoration of the freedom of the press, abolition of repressive laws enforced by the previous regime, the adoption of the 1987 Constitution, and the subordination of the military to civilian rule, despite several coup attempts during Aquino's rule.

The revolution provided for the restoration of democratic institutions after 13 years of authoritarian rule and these institutions have been used by various groups to challenge the entrenched political families and to strengthen Philippine democracy.

== Legacy ==
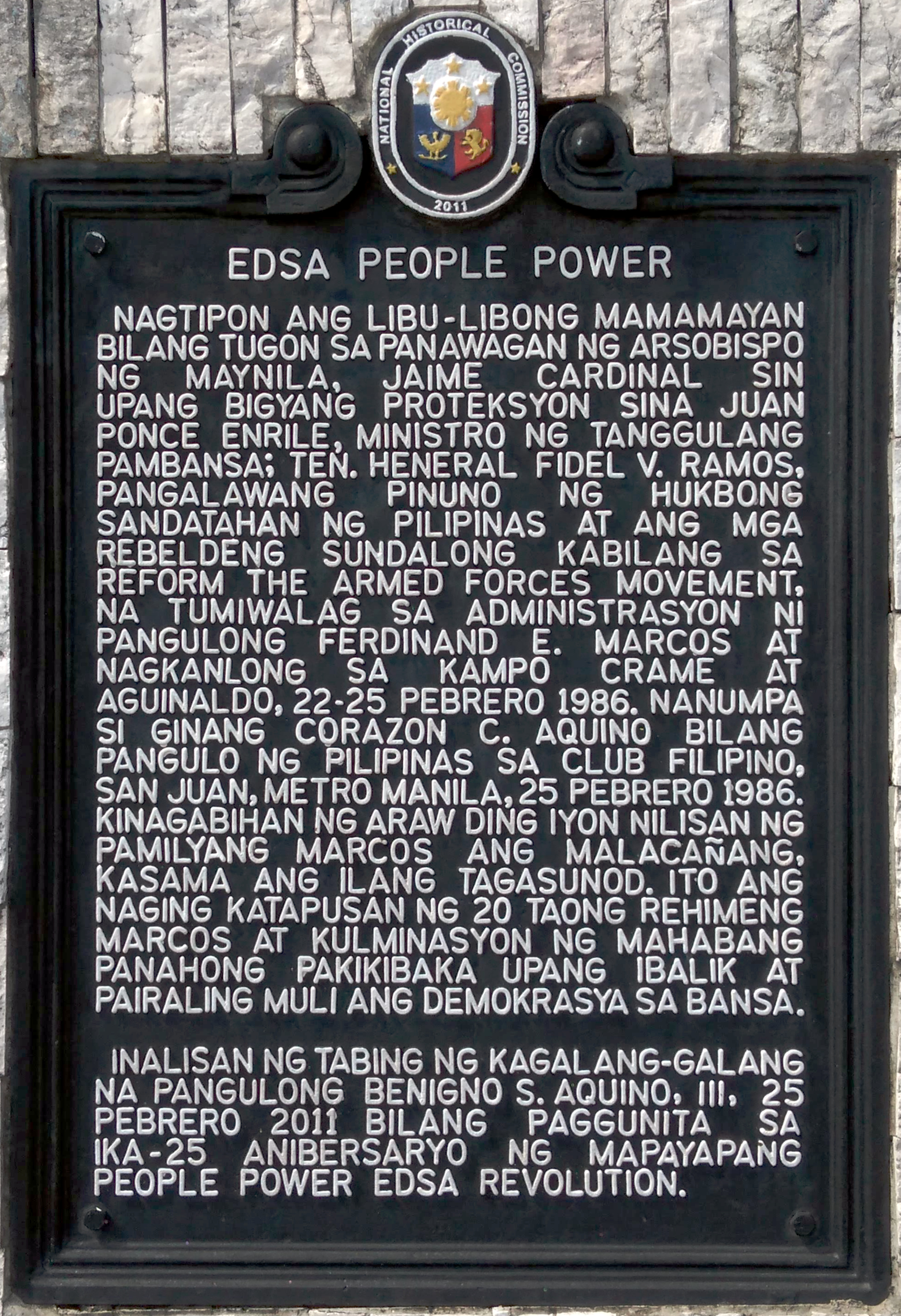
People Power Monument

The People Power Revolution has inspired a call for a change of government through peaceful protests rather than bloodshed. Many similar revolutions have followed since then, taking the Philippine example of nonviolent regime change, such as that in East Germany and many other former Soviet Bloc countries, most of which had direct relation to the end of the Cold War in 1989. To institutionalize its legacy, President Joseph Estrada issued Executive Order No. 82, s. 1999 to create the EDSA People Power Commission.

Rampant corruption during the term of President Joseph Estrada led to the similar 2001 EDSA Revolution leading to his resignation from the presidency.

On January 19, police and military forces withdrew their support from Estrada. At around noon on January 20, Davide swore Estrada's constitutional successor Vice President Gloria Macapagal-Arroyo into office. A few hours later, Estrada and his family fled Malacanang.

In spite of the revolution's repudiation of Marcos' dictatorial regime, the Marcos family slowly regained a political presence in the Philippines mostly through what researchers attribute to a systematic spread of lies and disinformation, with Imelda and her children Bongbong and Imee reacquiring positions in government by the 1990s. Bongbong himself was defeated as runner-up to Leni Robredo as a candidate for the Philippine vice presidency during the 2016 presidential elections. He protested in the Supreme Court and was denied multiple times, with the official gap getting even significantly larger from the original results. In 2021, Bongbong announced his bid for the Philippine presidency in the 2022 Philippine presidential election. He was elected president, marking the Marcos family's return to Malacañang after 36 years. In the 38th anniversary of the EDSA Revolution on February 25, 2024, the fight against charter change continued. "We are not EDSA-pwera. Because People Power was not only EDSA," the Campaign Against the Return of Marcoses and Martial Law (CARMMA) said. The wreath-laying ceremony and commemorative rites were led and organized by the National Historical Commission of the Philippines. "Ito po ay taon-taon naming gugunitain hangga't mayroon kaming mandato," [We will commemorate this every year as long as we have a mandate,] said Ian Alfonso, a senior researcher of NHCP.

=== Commemoration ===
People Power Anniversary
- Observed by: Philippines
- Type: National
- Significance: Commemoration of the People Power Revolution
- Date: February 25
- Next time: February 25, 2027
- Frequency: Annual
- First time: 1987; 1996 (as National Ecumenical Day of Prayer and Reconciliation); 2007 (as EDSA People Power Commemoration Week)

The EDSA Revolution Anniversary is a special public holiday in the Philippines. From 2002 to 2023, the holiday has been declared a special non-working holiday. It was not included in the list of holidays in 2024 declared by President Bongbong Marcos, the son of Ferdinand Marcos, in his proclamation, citing that it “falls on a Sunday,” which is considered as a rest day for most laborers, while maintaining respect for its commemoration. It was restored as a holiday in 2025, this time as a special working day. Despite this, several academic institutions, cities, and municipalities opted to suspend classes or implement alternative learning modes.

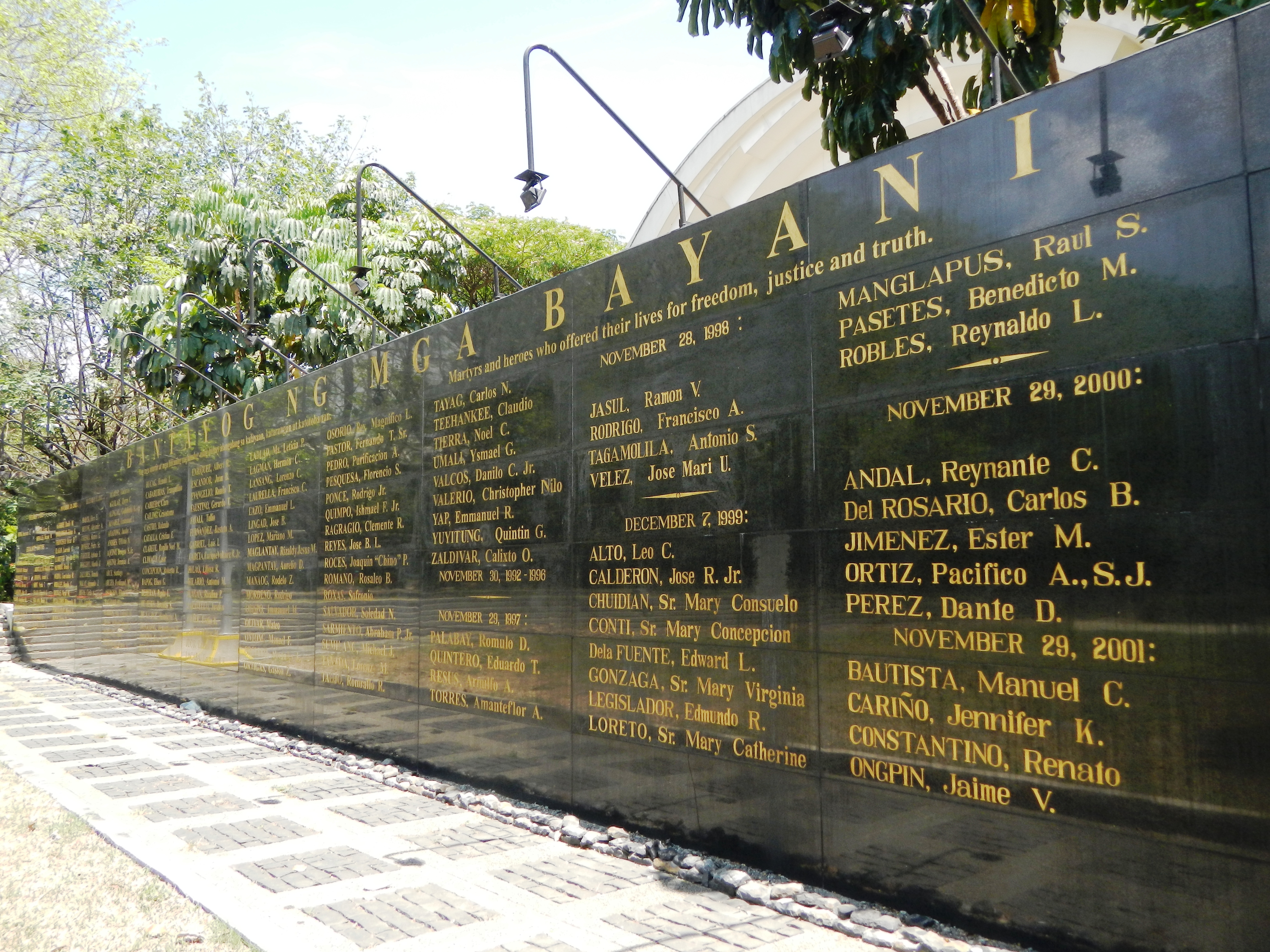
The Wall of Remembrance at the Bantayog ng mga Bayani

Three commemorative sites along EDSA memorialize the People Power Revolution, put up by different organizations to commemorate different aspects of the People Power Revolution.

- The Shrine of Mary, Queen of Peace, Our Lady of EDSA, better known as the EDSA Shrine is a small church put up in 1989 by the Roman Catholic Archdiocese of Manila in the Ortigas Center at the corner of EDSA with Ortigas Avenue. Priminently featuring the 35-foot (11 m) Our Lady of EDSA sculpture by Virginia Ty-Navarro and containing numerous other artworks throughout the church, it commemorates the "miraculously" peaceful nature of the People Power protests, as well as the role of the Catholic Church in the revolution.
- The Bantayog ng mga Bayani was put up by civil society groups and inaugurated in 1992 to commemorate the struggle against the Marcos dictatorship, and the People Power Revolution as a key turning point in the struggle. The site's Wall of Remembrance has an extensively researched list of the martyrs and heroes who fought the authoritarian regime. The site, designed by National Artist for landscape architecture Ildefonso P. Santos Jr., also features the "Inang Bayan" sculpture by Eduardo Castrillo, as well as a specialty library and a museum commemorating the martyrs and heroes honored on the Wall of Remembrance.
- The People's Park put up in 1993 by the Philippine Government on the southwest corner of Camp Aguinaldo at the intersection of EDSA and White Plains Avenue contains the 30-figure People Power Monument sculpture by Eduardo Castrillo as well as a 1983 statue of Ninoy Aquino sculpted by artist Tomas Concepcion.

=== In culture and the arts ===
10-peso coin commemorating the People Power Revolution

In 1986 a few months after February a music video starring various artists was released called, "Handog ng Pilipino sa Mundo" (Filipino's Gift to the World). It was written by Apo Hiking Society singer Jim Paredes and performed by numerous artists, and showed martial law heroes Jose W. Diokno, Lorenzo M. Tañada, Rene Saguisag, Butz Aquino, Joe Burgos, and Pres. Aquino with Vice-president Doy Laurel during their campaign.

In 2003, the Radio Broadcast of the Philippine People Power Revolution was inscribed in the United Nations Educational, Scientific and Cultural Organization (UNESCO) Memory of the World International Register.

== See also ==
Video of the oath taking at Club Filipino

- Proclamation No. 1081
- 1972 Philippines Martial law under Ferdinand Marcos
- 1986 Philippine presidential election
- EDSA
- Songs about the People Power Revolution:
  - "Bayan Ko"
  - "Magkaisa"
  - "Handog ng Pilipino sa Mundo"
- EDSA Shrine
- People Power Monument
- Bantayog ng mga Bayani

General:

- Timeline of the presidency of Ferdinand Marcos
- List of Memory of the World Documentary Heritage in the Philippines

Similar events:

- Second EDSA Revolution
- EDSA III
- Revolutions of 1989
- Colour revolution
- 2025–2026 Philippine anti-corruption protests

Organizations namesake:

- Partido Lakas ng Tao, (People Power Party) Fidel Ramos' political party named to campaign for being the hero of the revolution
