= Widjaja =

Widjaja or Wijaya, Widjaya is one of the most common surnames in Indonesia. Notable people with the surname include:

- Angelique Widjaja (born 1984), Indonesian tennis player
- Eka Tjipta Widjaja (1922–2019), Indonesian entrepreneur
- Elizabeth A. Widjaja (born 1951), Indonesian botanist
- Fuganto Widjaja, Indonesian billionaire
- Gloria Emanuelle Widjaja (born 1993), Indonesian badminton player
- Mieke Widjaja (born 1940), Indonesian actress
- Mira Widjaja (born 1951), Indonesian author
- Nani Widjaja (born 1943), Indonesian actress

== See also ==
- Wijaya (disambiguation)
- Jaja (disambiguation)
- WJJA (disambiguation)
