= Jaja =

Jaja may refer to:

== People ==
- Jajá Coelho (born 1986), Jakson Avelino Coelho, Brazilian football striker
- Jajá (footballer, born 1974), Jair Xavier de Brito, Brazilian football winger
- Jajá (footballer, born 1986), Francisco Jaílson de Sousa, Brazilian football attacking midfielder
- Jajá (footballer, born 1995), Hugo Gomes dos Santos Silva, Brazilian football midfielder
- Jajá (footballer, born 2001), Jair Diego Alves de Brito, Brazilian football forward
- JAJA (drag queen), contestant from season one of Drag Race Thailand
- Jaja of Opobo (1821–1891), the first monarch of Opobo
- Jaja Wachuku (1918–1996), Nigerian politician and humanitarian
- Jadwiga Jędrzejowska (1912–1980), Polish tennis player nicknamed "Ja-Ja"
- Laurent Jalabert (born 1968), retired French professional cyclist nicknamed "Jaja"
- Samir Geagea (born 1952), also spelled Samir Ja'ja', a Lebanese politician and commander
- Seth Accra Jaja, Nigerian academic

== Organizations ==
- Justice for Aquino, Justice for All, a broad-based coalition that united different ideologies to push for pressure politics in the Philippines

== Other uses ==
- Jaja, a crater on Ceres named after the Abkhazian harvest goddess
- Jaja, Iran (disambiguation), various places in Iran
- Jajaja, Spanish onomatopoeia for laughter
