= Wijaya =

Wijaya, Widjaya or Widjaja, an Indonesian surname and word meaning "victory" (from Sanskrit Vijaya), Its also a Chinese Indonesian surname based on Huang (黄), may refer to:

== People ==
- Angelique Widjaja (born 1984), Indonesian tennis player
- Candra Wijaya (born 1975), Chinese-Indonesian badminton player
- Chelsea Olivia Wijaya (born 1992), Indonesian actress and pop singer
- Eka Tjipta Widjaja (born 1922), Indonesian entrepreneur
- Elizabeth A. Widjaja (born 1951), Indonesian botanist
- Hendry Wijaya (born 1974), Indonesian pianist
- I Made Andhika Wijaya (born 1996), Indonesian footballer
- I Made Pasek Wijaya (born 1969), Indonesian footballer
- Indra Wijaya (born 1974), Indonesian badminton player
- Mieke Wijaya (born 1940), Indonesian actress
- Nani Widjaja (Nani Wijaya, born 1944), Indonesian actress
- Putu Wijaya (born 1944), Indonesian writer
- Raden Wijaya (fl. 1292–1309), Javanese king

== Other ==
- Wijaya FC, a Brunei football club
- Microgomphus wijaya, a dragonfly of family Gomphidae
- Kartika Wijaya, a hotel in Batu, East Java, Indonesia
- Jaya Wijaya, an alternate name for Puncak Jaya, a mountain in Papua Province, Indonesia
- Operation Jayawijaya, an Indonesian military operation during Operation Trikora

== See also ==
- Widjaja (disambiguation)
- Vijaya (disambiguation)
