= Jaja, Iran =

Jaja (Persian: جاجا) may refer to:

- Jaja, Isfahan
- Jaja, Tiran and Karvan, Isfahan Province
