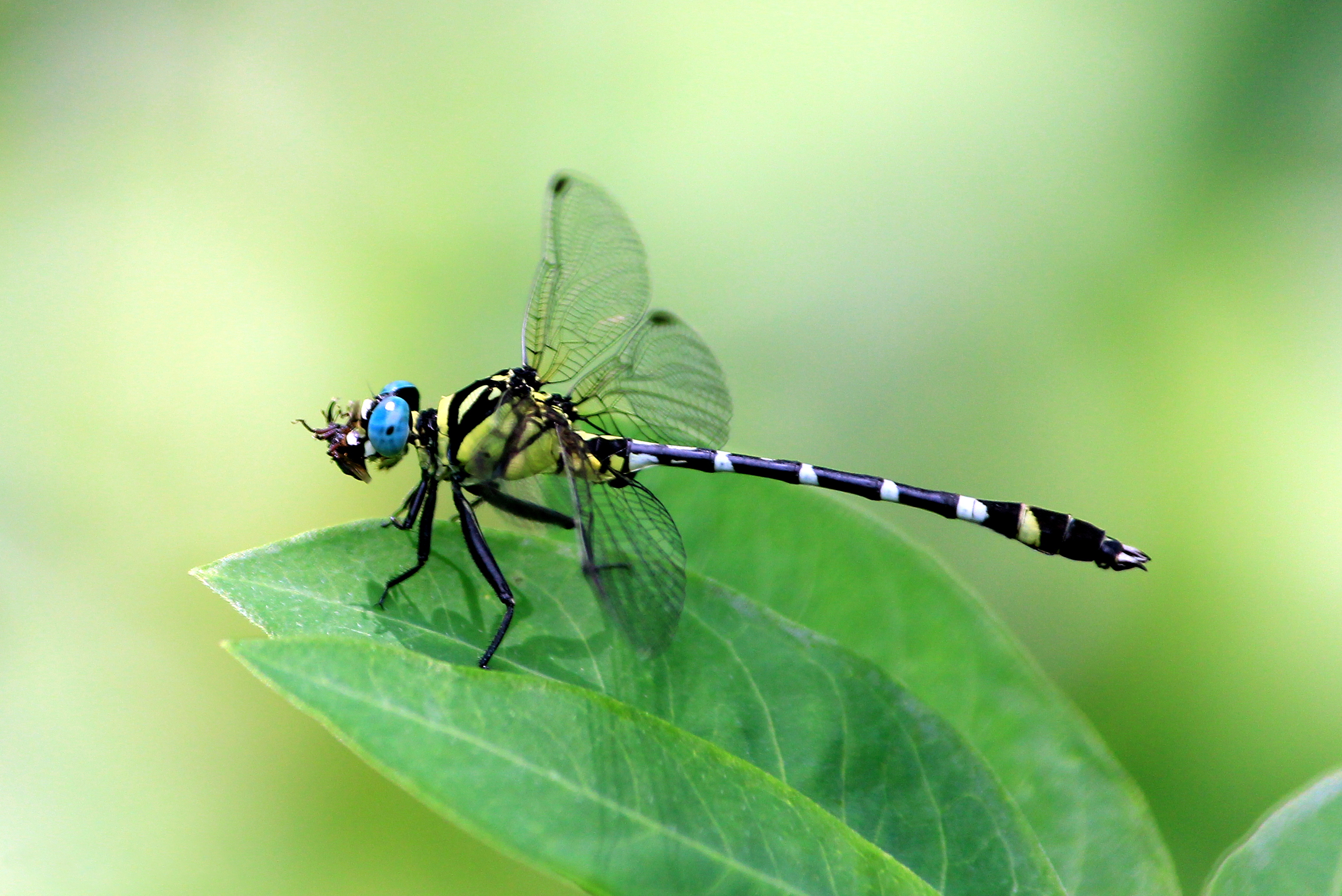
- Microgomphus torquatus

Scientific classification
- Kingdom: Animalia
- Phylum: Arthropoda
- Class: Insecta
- Order: Odonata
- Infraorder: Anisoptera
- Family: Gomphidae
- Genus: Microgomphus

= Microgomphus =

Genus of dragonflies

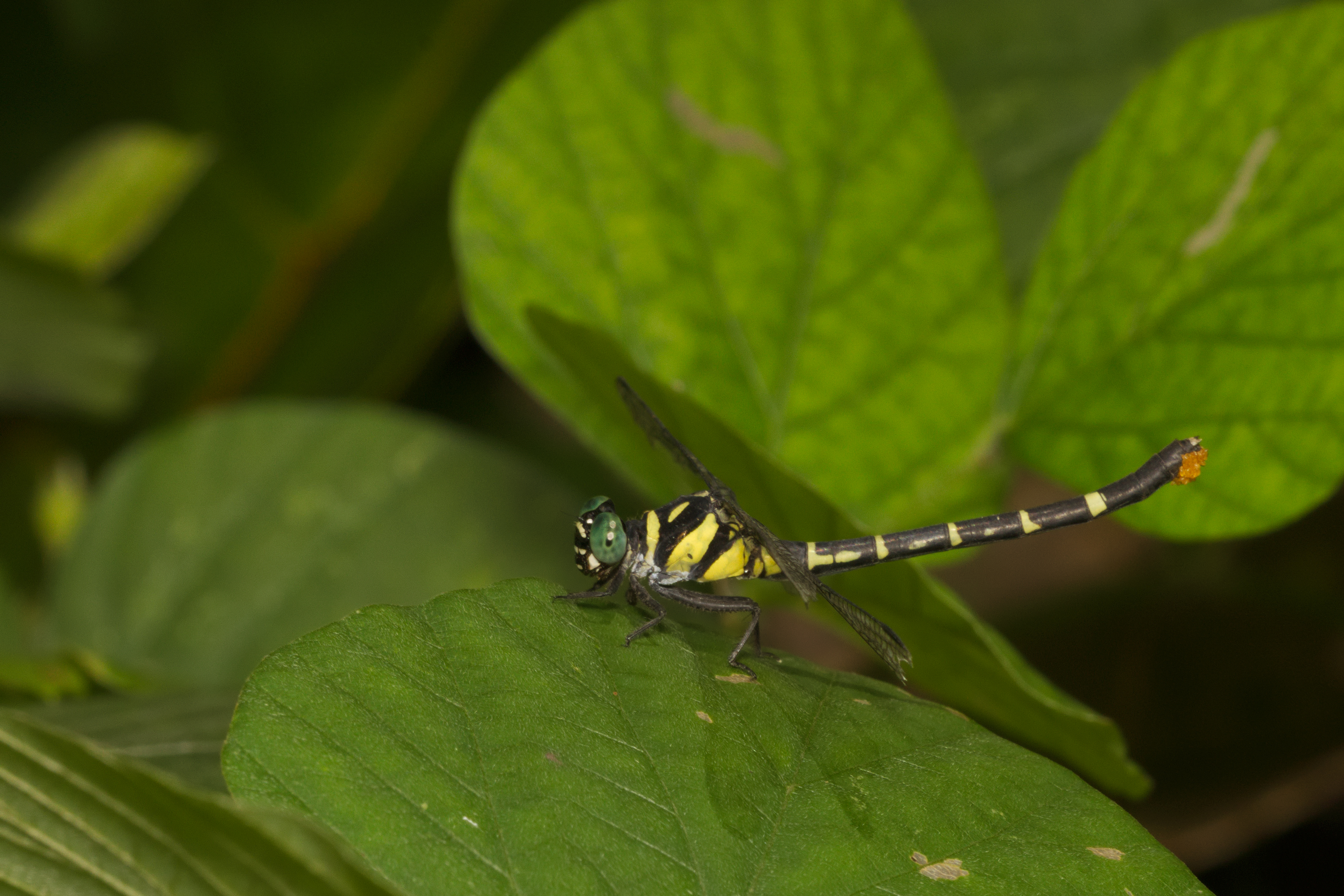
Microgomphus souteri in Kadavoor

Microgomphus is a genus of dragonfly in the family Gomphidae. It contains the following species:

- Microgomphus camerunensis Longfield, 1951
- Microgomphus chelifer Selys, 1858
- Microgomphus corbeti Pinhey, 1951
- Microgomphus jannyae Legrand, 1992
- Microgomphus jurzitzai Karube, 2000
- Microgomphus lilliputians Fraser, 1923
- Microgomphus loogali Fraser, 1923
- Microgomphus nyassicus (Grünberg, 1902)
- Microgomphus schoutedeni Fraser, 1949
- Microgomphus souteri Fraser, 1924
- Microgomphus thailandica Asahina, 1981
- Microgomphus torquatus (Selys, 1854)
- Microgomphus verticalis (Selys, 1873)
- Microgomphus wijaya Lieftinck, 1940
- Microgomphus zebra (Martin, 1911)
