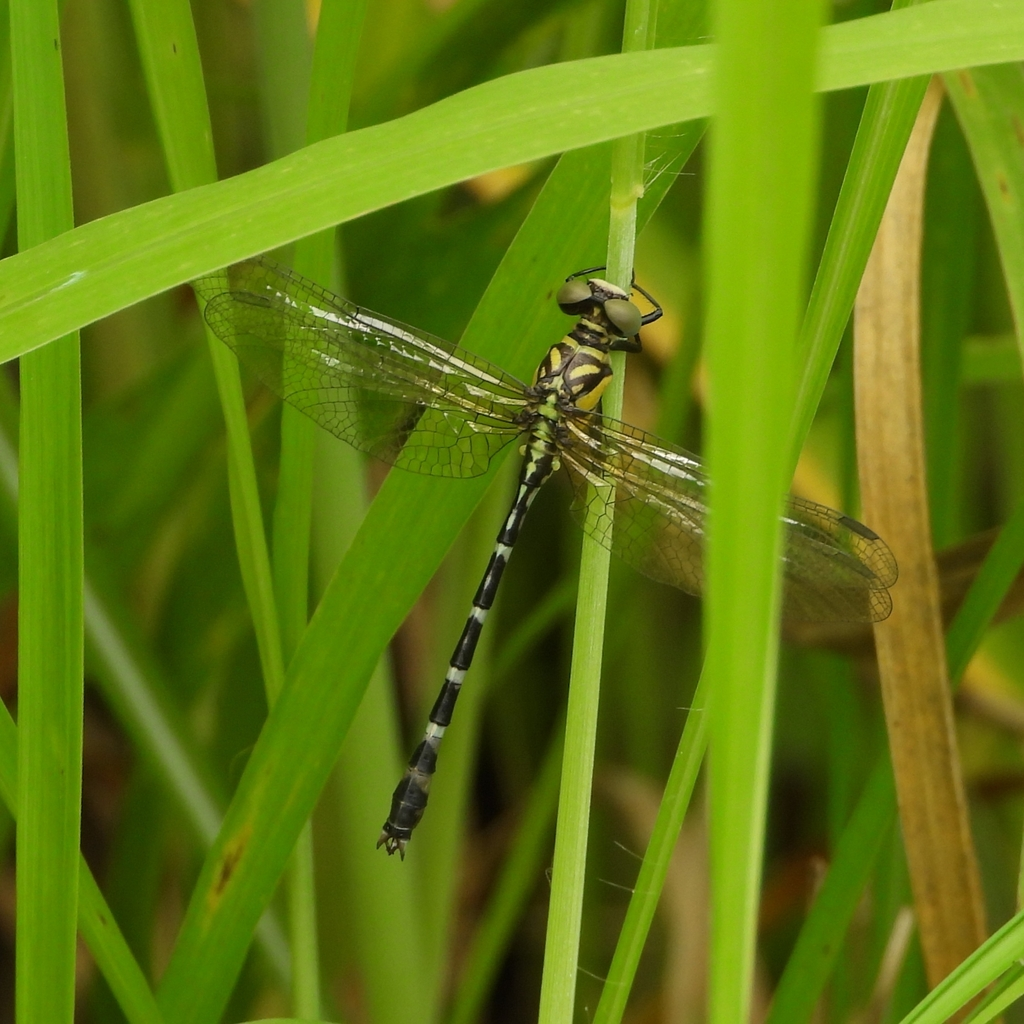
- Male

Conservation status
- Data Deficient (IUCN 3.1)

Scientific classification
- Kingdom: Animalia
- Phylum: Arthropoda
- Class: Insecta
- Order: Odonata
- Infraorder: Anisoptera
- Family: Gomphidae
- Genus: Microgomphus
- Species: M. torquatus

Binomial name
- Microgomphus torquatus (Selys, 1854)

Synonyms
- Cyclogomphus torquatus Selys, 1854

= Microgomphus torquatus =

Species of dragonfly

Microgomphus torquatus, the Deccan scissortail or collared pygmy clubtail, is a dragonfly species in the Microgomphus genus of the Gomphidae family. It has been found in Maharashtra. It is also found to occur in the Deccan part of India.

== Description ==
It is a small dragonfly with greenish blue eyes or brownish green eyes. Thorax is black, marked with yellow. Abdomen is black, marked with greenish white. Segments three to seven have greenish white narrow basal rings. It can be distinguished by the shape of anal appendages from other gomphids. A similar species to Microgomphus torquatus is Microgomphus souteri, both of which are small in size. However, M. torquatus can be distinguished by the shape of cerci from M. souteri.

== Range ==
This species is native to India. It has its distribution from Gujarat to Karnataka and yet can be found in more southern parts of India. And it is found to occur in West Bengal as well.

== Habitat ==
This dragonfly is found in rocks or boulders of rivers, streams, canals of Deccan Plateau.

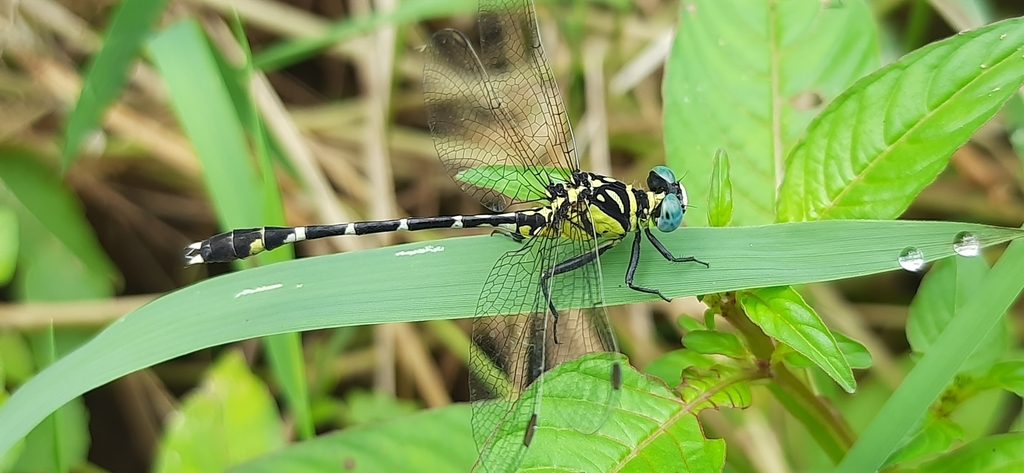
Microgomphus torquatus, Pygmy collared clubtail from river bhadra.

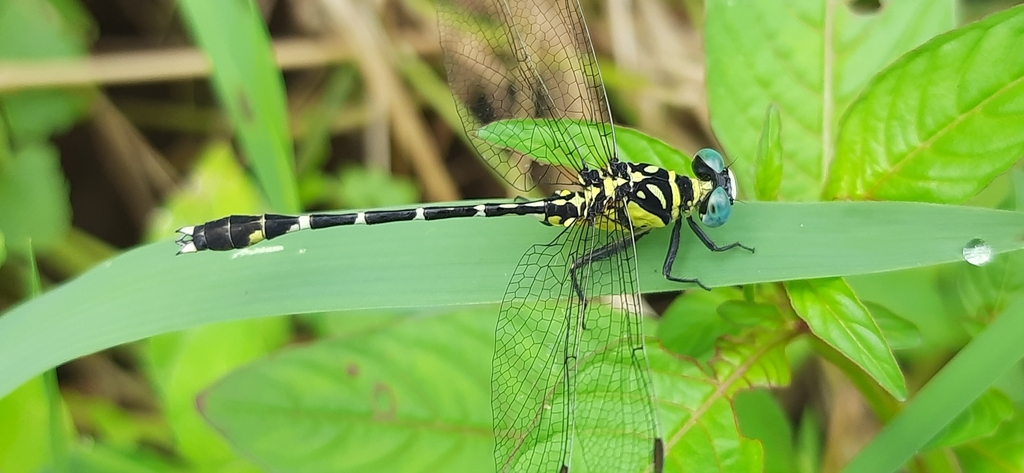
Microgomphus torquatus, Pygmy collared clubtail from river bhadra.
