= Bijoya (disambiguation) =

Bijoya is a 2019 Indian Bengali-language film directed by Kaushik Ganguly.

Bijoya may also refer to:

- Bijoya Chakravarty, Indian politician from the Bharatiya Janata Party
- Bijoya Ray, wife of Indian filmmaker Satyajit Ray

== See also ==
- Vijaya (disambiguation)
