= Microgomphus schoutedeni =

Conservation status
- Least Concern (IUCN 3.1)

Scientific classification
- Kingdom: Animalia
- Phylum: Arthropoda
- Class: Insecta
- Order: Odonata
- Infraorder: Anisoptera
- Family: Gomphidae
- Genus: Microgomphus
- Species: M. schoutedeni

Binomial name
- Microgomphus schoutedeni Fraser, 1949

Species of dragonfly

Microgomphus schoutedeni is a species of dragonfly in the family Gomphidae. It is found in the Democratic Republic of the Congo, Kenya, and Uganda. Its natural habitats are subtropical or tropical moist lowland forests and rivers.
