= Microgomphus nyassicus =

Conservation status
- Least Concern (IUCN 3.1)

Scientific classification
- Kingdom: Animalia
- Phylum: Arthropoda
- Class: Insecta
- Order: Odonata
- Infraorder: Anisoptera
- Family: Gomphidae
- Genus: Microgomphus
- Species: M. nyassicus

Binomial name
- Microgomphus nyassicus (Grünberg, 1902)

Species of insect

Microgomphus nyassicus is a species of dragonfly in the family Gomphidae. It is found in the Democratic Republic of the Congo, Kenya, Tanzania, Zambia, and Zimbabwe. Its natural habitats are subtropical or tropical moist lowland forests and rivers.
