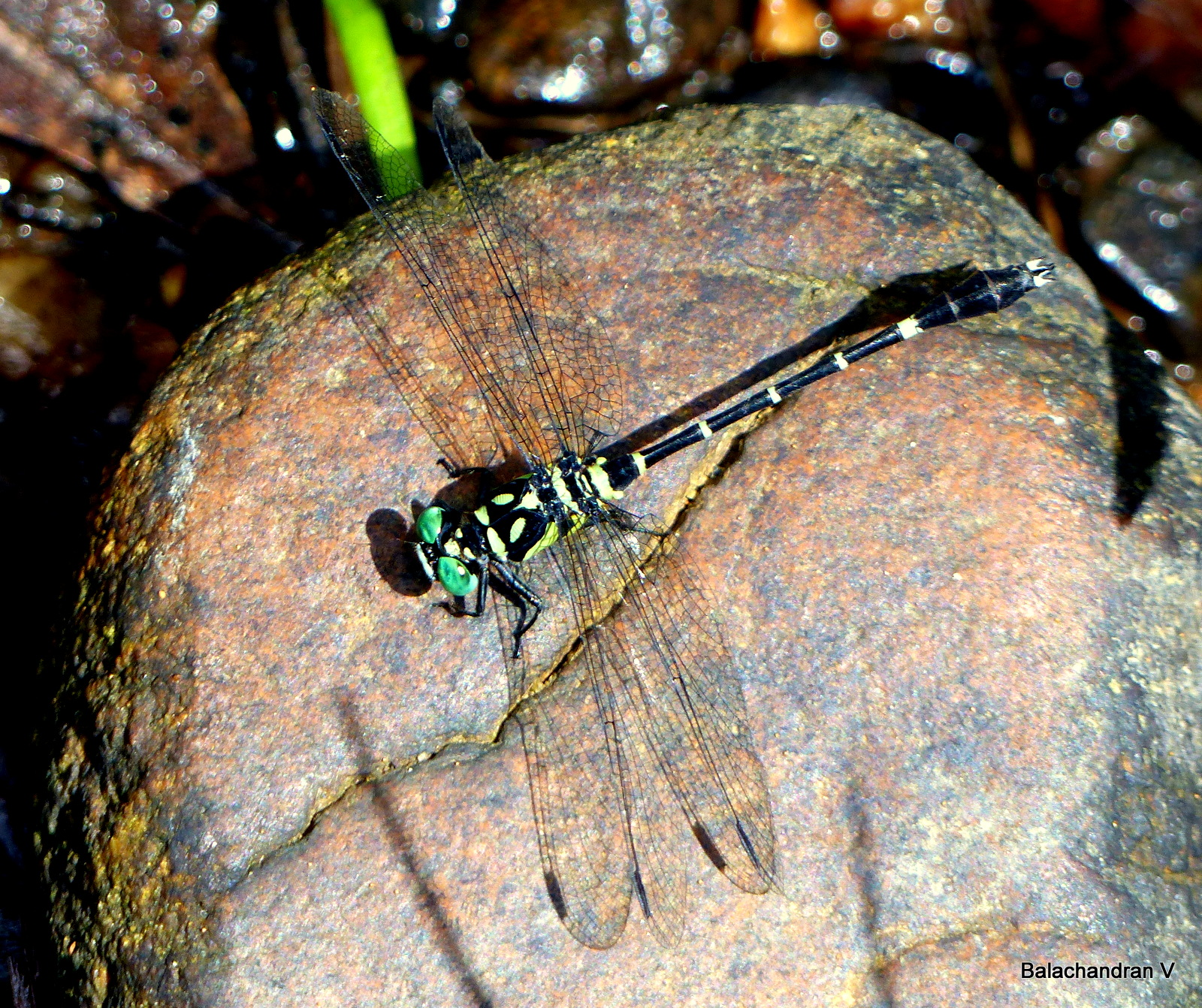
- Male

Conservation status
- Least Concern (IUCN 3.1)

Scientific classification
- Kingdom: Animalia
- Phylum: Arthropoda
- Class: Insecta
- Order: Odonata
- Infraorder: Anisoptera
- Family: Gomphidae
- Genus: Microgomphus
- Species: M. souteri

Binomial name
- Microgomphus souteri Fraser, 1924

= Microgomphus souteri =

Species of dragonfly

Microgomphus souteri is a species of small dragonfly in the family Gomphidae. It is endemic to the forest streams of Western Ghats of India.

== Description and habitat ==
It is a small dragonfly with bottle-green eyes. Its thorax is black with slightly interrupted mesothoracic collar and narrow ante-humeral stripes. There is a broad black stripe on postero-lateral suture. Abdomen is black, marked with greenish yellow. Segment 1 has a narrow apical border. Segment 2 has a broad basal ring. Segments 3 to 6 have narrow basal rings. Segment 7 is similar, but broader. Segments 8 to 10 are unmarked. Female is similar to the male.

It looks similar to Microgomphus torquatus; but can be distinguished by the marks on thorax and by the shape of the anal appendages. Superior appendages have the inner branches much longer, springing from the appendages much nearer the base, and extending beyond their apices. The small outer spine near the apex is much more noticeable. Inferior appendage is more robust and slightly longer. It is distinguished from other similar Gomphidae by the shape of the anal appendages.

It is commonly seen resting on stones or rocks in the stream bed.

== See also ==
- List of odonates of India
- List of odonata of Kerala
