= KAAKBAY =

Umbrella Organization

- Kilusan sa Kapangyarihan at Karapatan ng Bayan
- Formation: March 1983; 43 years ago
- Founder: José W. Diokno
- Founded at: 55 3rd Street, New Manila, Quezon City
- Type: Advocacy group
- Purpose: parliament-of-the-streets
- Headquarters: New Manila, Quezon City
- Location: Philippines
- Methods: Pressure politics
- Chairman: José W. Diokno
- Key people: Randy David; Carmen Diokno; Ed Garcia; Nini Quezon-Avanceña; JBL Reyes
- Affiliations: centrist

Kilusan sa Kapangyarihan at Karapatan ng Bayan, (lit. 'Movement for People's Sovereignty and Democracy') better known as KAAKBAY (lit. 'joining arms') was a Filipino umbrella group that was first created to introduce a novel political concept called the parliament-of-the-streets, which was a form of Filipino advocacy of pressure politics that peacefully pushed for the ouster of Ferdinand Marcos leading up to the EDSA Revolution. It was conceived by senator and lawyer José W. Diokno in 1983.

== Etymology and purpose ==
As was common in the alphabet soup culture in the Philippines, Diokno conceived of the name KAAKBAY to symbolize unity due to the vast growing number of opposition groups that lacked a common method or identity. He wanted to create an umbrella group to welcome different protestors against the abuses of the dictatorship. The name KAAKBAY stands for the "Movement for People's Sovereignty and Democracy." Diokno conceived of the idea of pressure politics to invoke mass protests as a key to force change in the government structure instead of relying on traditional politics, due to the lack of sound methods available in the Marcos dictatorship. The goal was also to limit the chances of violent protests as he believed it had a better chance of creating greater change in the country.

== History ==
KAAKBAY was formed in Manila in March 1983. The umbrella group or coalition focused on distributing pamphlets and information to disseminate the concept of pressure politics into the Philippine political arena. To that end, the group attracted many academics and young students who protested in the freedom parks and public spaces. One of the known publications include "Twenty-Four Questions about Filipino Nationalism" in 1984. Most of its publications were in its newspaper called "The Plaridel Papers," which was published since October 1983 and was named after the revolutionary Pláridel. The coalition welcomed many women into its leadership as a sign of its progressive call to welcome different groups. The board composed of three women members, University of the Philippines (UP) professor Karina David, feminist Zenaida "Nini" Quezon-Avanceña, and future cabinet Secretary Carmen "Mita" Pardo de Tavera. As the group grew nationwide, rallies were held in Quezon City and Davao City. A few months later, former Sen. Benigno "Ninoy" Aquino Jr. was assassinated. The group later called on other groups to create the much larger mass coalition to completely unite all forces against Marcos, which was called the Justice for Aquino, Justice for All movement in August 1983. After the People Power Revolution on February 25, 1987, Pres. Corazon Aquino sought to appoint leaders who took part as street parliamentarians during the Marcos dictatorship. In 1987, Pres. Aquino appointed KAAKBAY members de Tavera and David.

== Notable members ==
- Karina Constantino David, professor at the University of the Philippines Diliman, wife of Randy David and mother of ABS-CBN reporter Kara David;
- Randy David, professor at the University of the Philippines Diliman;
- Mita Pardo de Tavera, doctor, granddaughter of Prime Minister Trinidad Pardo de Tavera, and secretary of the Department of Social Welfare and Development and Executive Secretary of Pres. Corazon Aquino;
- Carmen Diokno, activist and wife of José W. Diokno;
- José W. Diokno, founder, former senator, and is considered as the father of human rights in the Philippines;
- Ed Garcia, political science professor and activist;
- Nini Quezon-Avanceña, founder of the Concerned Women of the Philippines (CWP), human rights activist, and daughter of former President Manuel Quezon;
- J.B.L. Reyes, former Supreme Court Associate Justice;
