= Justice for Aquino, Justice for All =

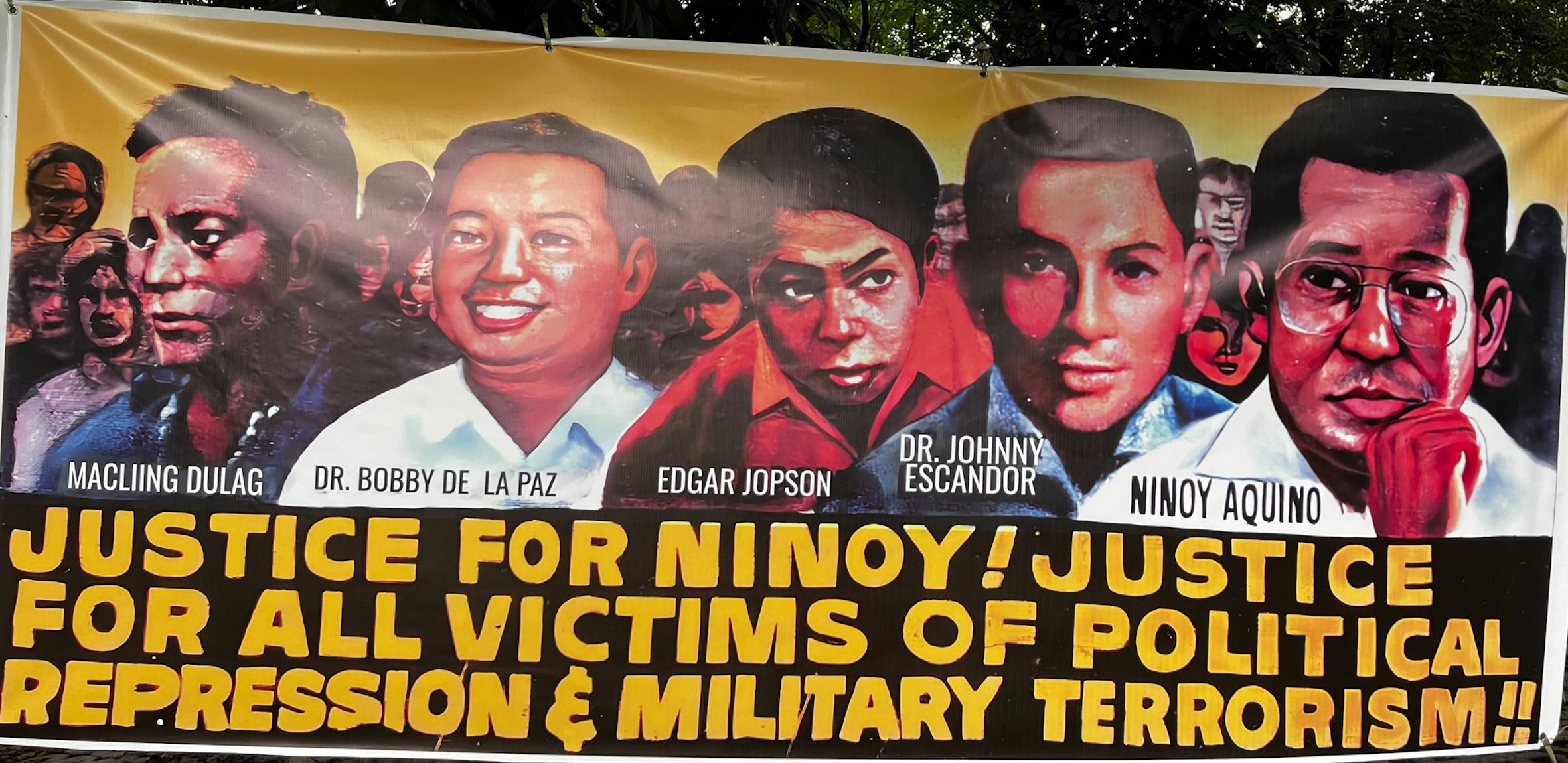
- JAJA Rally Poster unveiled 10 days after Aquino Day
- Merged into: Coalition for the Restoration of Democracy (CORD)
- Formation: August 25, 1983; 43 years ago
- Founder: José W. Diokno; Agapito Aquino
- Type: Advocacy group
- Purpose: parliament-of-the-streets
- Location: Philippines
- Methods: Pressure politics
- Chairman: José W. Diokno
- Key people: Corazon Aquino
- Subsidiaries: Kilusan sa Kapangyarihan at Karapatan ng Bayan (KAAKBAY)
- Secessions: Bagong Alyansang Makabayan
- Affiliations: centrist center-left

Justice for Aquino, Justice for All (JAJA) was the first major coalition based on a parliament-of-the-streets, which was a Filipino advocacy of pressure politics that peacefully pushed for the ouster of Ferdinand Marcos after the assassination of Ninoy Aquino.

== Establishment and widespread effects ==
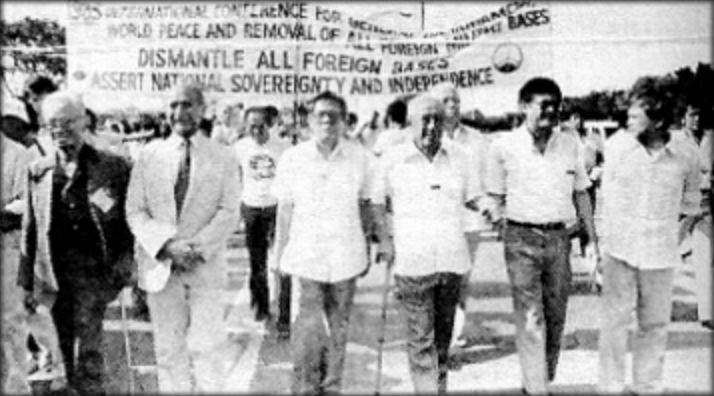
Senators Diokno (center), Joker Arroyo (far-right), and Lorenzo Tañada (third from right) in a mass protest

The assassination of Sen. Aquino created economic mayhem and widespread ire among all members of the community, which forced an unprecedented unification of opposition forces to oust the president. After the assassination of Sen. Aquino on August 21, 1983, JAJA was formed four days later from different sub-coalitions by Sen. José W. Diokno's Kilusan sa Kapangyarihan at Karapatan ng Bayan or KAAKBAY, and Butz Aquino's August Twenty One Movement or ATOM. It quickly ballooned in two months to almost 100 chapters and sub-coalitions, and the views were diversified and extreme. Other member groups that quickly joined included the Ecumenical Movement for Justice and Peace (EMJP), the Bagong Alyansang Makabayan led by Lean Alejandro, the Anti-Bases Coalition (ABC) also led by Sen. Diokno, PDP-LABAN party under Nene Pimentel, the religious congregation-led Task Force Detainees of the Philippines (TFDP), the Nationalist Alliance for Justice, Freedom and Democracy (NAJFD) under Lorenzo Tañada, the Alliance of Makati Associations (AMA), the Alliance of Concerned Teachers (ACT), the Movement of Attorneys for Brotherhood, Integrity and Nationalism, Inc. (MABINI), the Mamamayang Nagkaisa kay Aquino (MANA), the Concerned Artists of the Philippines (CAP), the Kilusang Mayo Uno (KMU), the League of Filipino Students (LFS), the Samahang para sa Pananampalataya at Katarungan (SAPAK), the University of the Philippines student-led SANDIWA in Tarlac, and plenty of other parties, coalitions, and political groups.

It was the first major coalition to unite the fractious divisions among the anti-Marcos opposition. The "parliament-of-the-streets" was first discussed on the August 1984 issue of the Plaridel Papers, eyeing for mass protests needed to establish a "popular democracy" rather than one run on government institutions that were deemed to be failed democracies. The group was made to represent not only Sen. Aquino, but other martyred activists such as Dr. Bobby Dela Paz, M.D., who took care of Samar patients for free with his wife, tribal chief Macling Dulag who resisted the expropriation and building of the Chico Hydroelectric Dam in ancestral land, student leader Edgar Jopson who was a member of the Communist Party of the Philippines, and NPA leader and rural doctor Johnny Escandor, M.D., who spend his time giving free medical aid to NPA members and farmers before being tortured by the METROCOM paramilitary.

Half-a-million people attended the Indignation rally at Liwasang Bonifacion in Manila. Other protests were in Davao City, with estimated 6000 participants and Zamboanga City, with estimated 10000 participants. In November 1983, observing the 51st birth anniversary of Ninoy Aquino, another JAJA rally in Luneta drew 250,000 demonstrators. A key organizer in the campaign apart from Senator Diokno, was the Aquino family including Butz, who partially funded the coalition. Sen. Aquino's wife, Corazon or "Cory" would also play an important role in the campaign. The future president Cory Aquino organized a rally at Malacañang Palace, the house of Marcos, that fell on the 11th anniversary of the declaration of martial law and the one-month anniversary of Aquino's assassination on September 21, 1983. 15,000 demonstrators marched from the palace to the Mendiola Bridge, a cite of numerous protests, rallies, and brutal government massacres. Here at Mendiola Street, marines were ordered by Marcos to shoot at and kill eleven demonstrators. Hundreds of protestors were injured. The violence only spawned more resistance from the people.

== Merger and aftermath ==
JAJA, though united against Marcos, was unstable due to disagreements among leftists led by activist Lean Alejandro and moderates such as Diokno, Aquino, and Tañada. KAAKBAY served as the main coalition that kept the other extreme groups from leaving JAJA. Unfortunately, JAJA was later replaced by the Coalition of Organizations for the Restoration of Democracy (CORD) in mid-1984, which had almost the same members. Before the creation of CORD, many former JAJA members who disagreed with the communists also organized a much wider alliance called the Kongreso ng Mamamayang Pilipino (KOMPIL) or the Congress of the Filipino People, and was mainly headed by Diokno.

The coalitions continued to reorganize through the Kongreso ng Mamamayang Pilipino or KOMPIL, until Cory Aquino was chosen to lead the people and eventually defeat Ferdinand Marcos in the 1986 Snap Election.

== Legacy ==
Other than popularizing the parliament-of-the-streets that culminated in the People Power Revolution in 1986, JAJA pushed for transformative justice in the Philippines that led to the promotion of other causes in the country during a transformative age in the 1980s. Issues such as feminism and nationalism blossomed under this period and was put on the forefront alongside human rights concerns. It was the persistent push for peaceful protest that impacted the peaceful transition of power of the People Power Revolution rather than a coup d'etat. This movement triggered more bursts of expressions of frustration at the government's poor reaction against the assassination.

== Principles ==
Based on the parliament of the streets concept of mass rallies and peaceful resistance, JAJA resisted the elections and called for the boycott of pseudo-democratic procedures advocated by the Marcos dictatorship. Principally, the group focused on bringing to court and to justice human rights violations by the paramilitary and cronies of the ex-president.

== Notable members ==
- Lean Alejandro, member of BAYAN
- Butz Aquino, member of ATOM
- Corazon Aquino, widow of Sen. Ninoy Aquino
- Joker Arroyo, member of MABINI
- Randy David, member of KAAKBAY
- José W. Diokno, member of KAAKBAY
- Mariani Dimaranan, member of the Task Force Detainees of the Philippines (TFDP)
- Lorenzo Tañada
- Wigberto Tañada

== See also ==
- People Power Revolution
