= Pressure politics =

Pressure politics generally refers to political action which relies heavily on the use of mass media and mass communications to persuade politicians that the public wants or demands a particular action. However, it can also refer to intimidation, threats, and other covert techniques as well.

== Temperance movement ==
The use of pressure, intimidation and manipulation has existed for millennia. However, its origins are most commonly associated with the temperance movement in the late 19th century and first two decades of the 20th century. Discovering the power of utilizing the mass media to exert pressure on politicians is usually attributed to Wayne Wheeler, the de facto leader of the Anti-Saloon League. Under his mentorship, a number of skilled practitioners of pressure politics emerged within the league (Odegard, 1928). One of the most accomplished of these was William E. Johnson, better known as "Pussyfoot" Johnson.

One leader of the league testified that prior to its passage in Congress, he had compiled a list of 13,000 business people who supported prohibition. They were then given their instructions at the crucial time:

We blocked the telegraph wires in Congress for three days. One of our friends sent seventy- five telegrams, each signed differently with the name of one his subordinates. The campaign was successful. Congress surrendered. The first to bear the white flag was Senator Warren Harding of Ohio. He told us frankly he was opposed to the amendment, but since it was apparent from the telegrams that the business world was demanding it, he would submerge his own opinion and vote for submission. (Pollard, 1932, p. 107).

The league was so powerful that even national politicians feared its strength. The Eighteenth Amendment creating Prohibition might well not have passed if a secret ballot had made it impossible for the league to have punished the "disobedient" at the next election (Sinclair, 1962, p. 110).

The Anti-Saloon League did not believe its actions to be immoral. To the contrary, its activities to bring about Prohibition were viewed as moral and justified because it believed it was working to bring about God's will (Asbury, 1968, pp. 101–102).

== Global movements ==
=== 1986 People Power Revolution in the Philippines ===
In the Philippines, after the assassination of Benigno "Ninoy" Aquino Jr. in August 1983 at Manila Airport (now called Ninoy Aquino International Airport), Jose W. Diokno, the leader of the opposition against the Ferdinand Marcos dictatorship, through his umbrella organization the Kilusan sa Kapangyarihan at Karapatan ng Bayan (Movement for People's Sovereignty and Democracy) Organization or KAAKBAY that was formed in March 1983, used pressure politics to sway and battle the Marcos dictatorship. KAAKBAY used a publication called, "The Plaridel Papers" to pursue their ideology of pressure politics or mass protests as a peaceful form of resistance. The August 1984 edition of The Plaridel Papers popularized the concept of pressure politics and introduced a political system that would involve the "parliament-of-the-streets" in building a "popular democracy". KAAKBAY, an organization composed of liberal democrats, eventually joined with other center-left and leftist organizations and coalitions to form the first major coalition for the opposition called, "Justice for Aquino, Justice for All" or JAJA, in 1983.

JAJA eventually paved the way for the very first congress of the opposition called KOMPIL in January 1984. The congress was organized by some social democrats who were part of JAJA. The congress leaders argued on boycotting or joining the midterm elections, an issue which was labeled the "Call for Meaningful Elections" (CAMEL). Although JAJA mainly served to boycott the elections as a means to delegitimize Marcos's rule, it was through these coalitions and conferences that Cory Aquino was selected as the sole candidate in the eventual snap election in 1986, and the People Power Revolution occurred. Many of those who boycotted were participants in this peaceful revolution and even led the people to Malacañang Palace, after the Marcos family escaped in exile via helicopter to Hawaii.

== See also ==
- Politics
- Lobbying
- Advocacy group
