= WJJA =

WJJA may refer to:

- WJTE-LP, a low-power radio station (98.5 FM) licensed to East Berstadt, Kentucky, United States, which held the call sign WJJA-LP from 2003 to 2017
- WMLW-TV, a television station (channel 49 analog/48 digital) licensed to Racine, Wisconsin, United States, which held the call sign WJJA from June 1983 to April 2008
