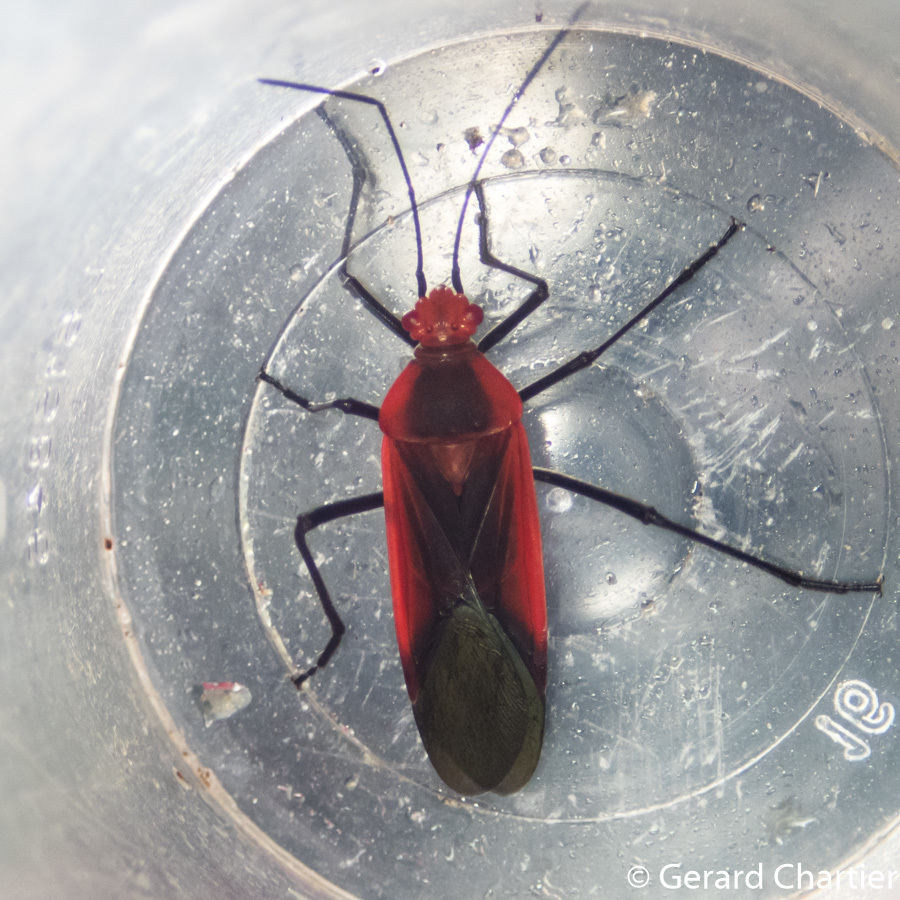
- Leptocoris rufomarginatus

Scientific classification
- Kingdom: Animalia
- Phylum: Arthropoda
- Clade: Pancrustacea
- Class: Insecta
- Order: Hemiptera
- Suborder: Heteroptera
- Family: Rhopalidae
- Subfamily: Serinethinae
- Genus: Leptocoris; Hahn, 1833

Synonyms
- Lygeomorphus Blanchard, 1840; Pyrrhotes Westwood, 1840; Serinetha Spinola, 1837; Tynotoma Amyot & Serville, 1843

= Leptocoris =

Genus of true bugs

External image
- Images at iNaturalist

Leptocoris is the largest genus of bugs in the subfamily Serinethinae. Species in this genus are distributed throughout Africa, South Asia, and Oceania, and are thought to have originated in Africa, where the greatest diversity of Leptocoris species are found. Several species are known as soapberry bugs in Australia, notably Leptocoris mitellatus.

== Description ==
Members of this genus are large-bodied and have short, wide pronota; they are similar in appearance to the New World genus Jadera (of which there is no range overlap). Leptocoris species can be easily distinguished from the small, slender Boisea (of which there is substantial range overlap). The Australian Leptocoris tagalicus has been studied for its ability to rapidly adapt to invasive hosts (e.g. balloon vine) and is seen as a possible means of biocontrol for environmental weeds. The southeast Asian species Leptocoris vicinus is common in urban settings, although it is frequently misidentified as Leptocoris augur.

== Gallery ==
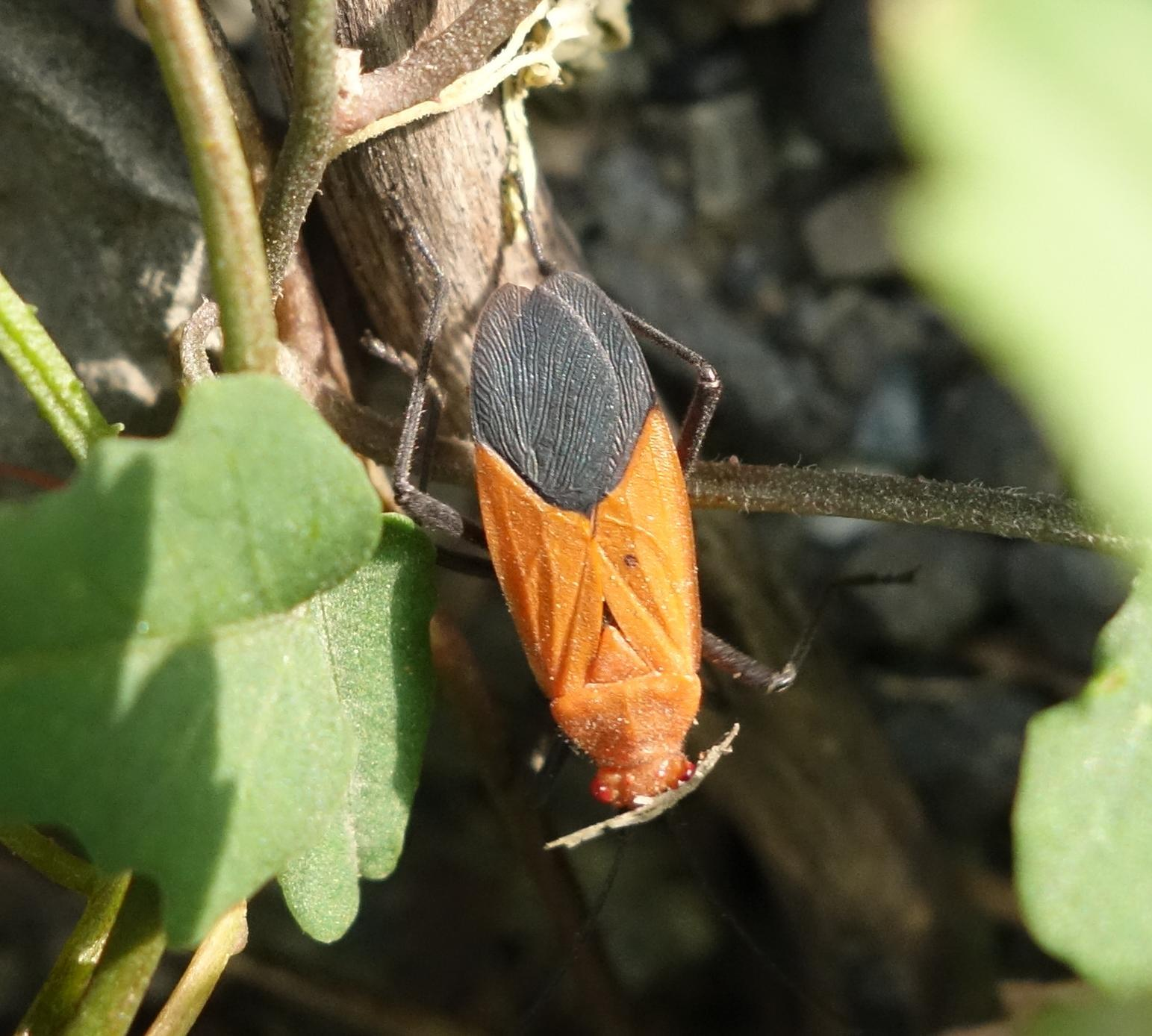
Leptocoris augur, Taiwan.

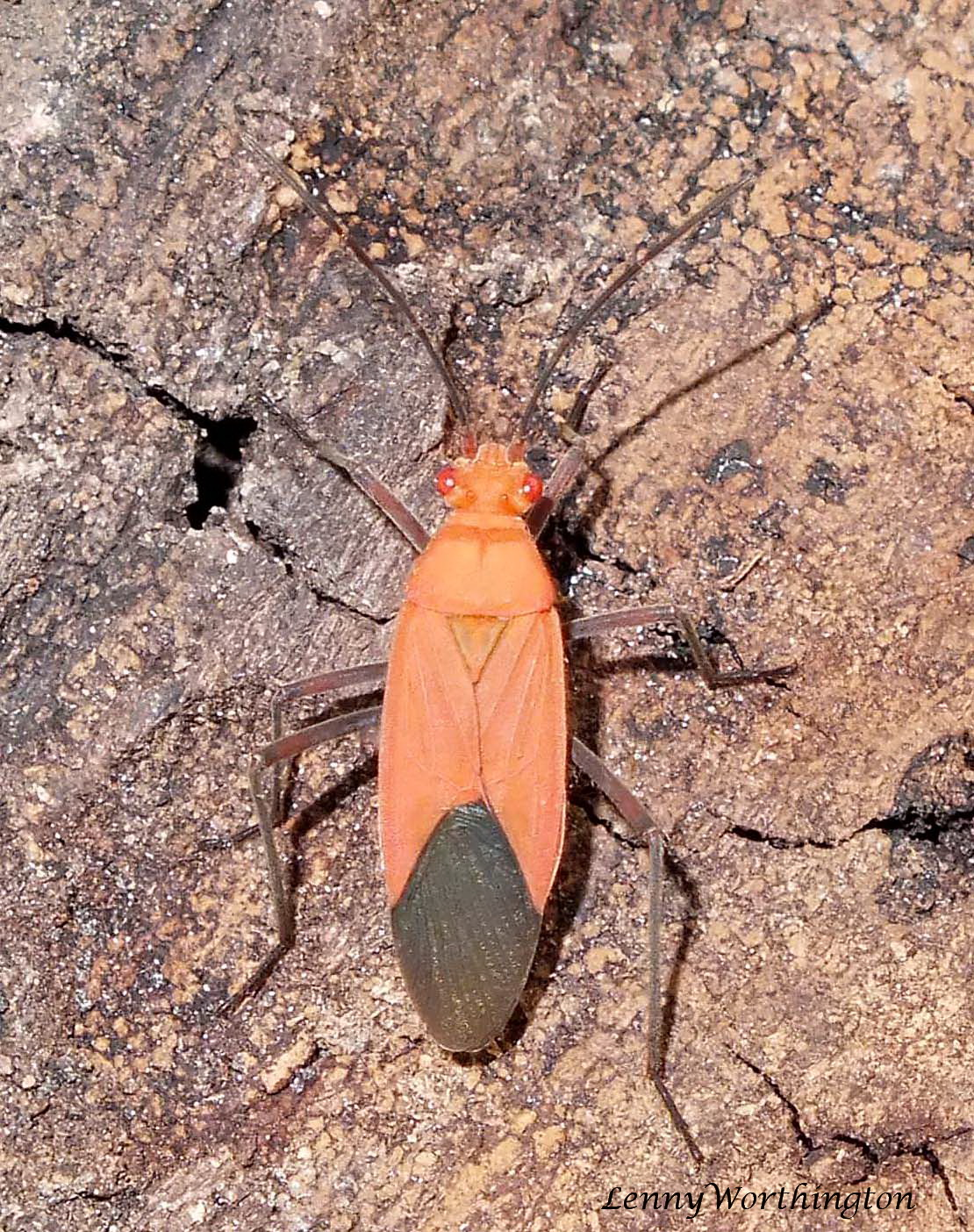
Leptocoris dispar, Thailand.

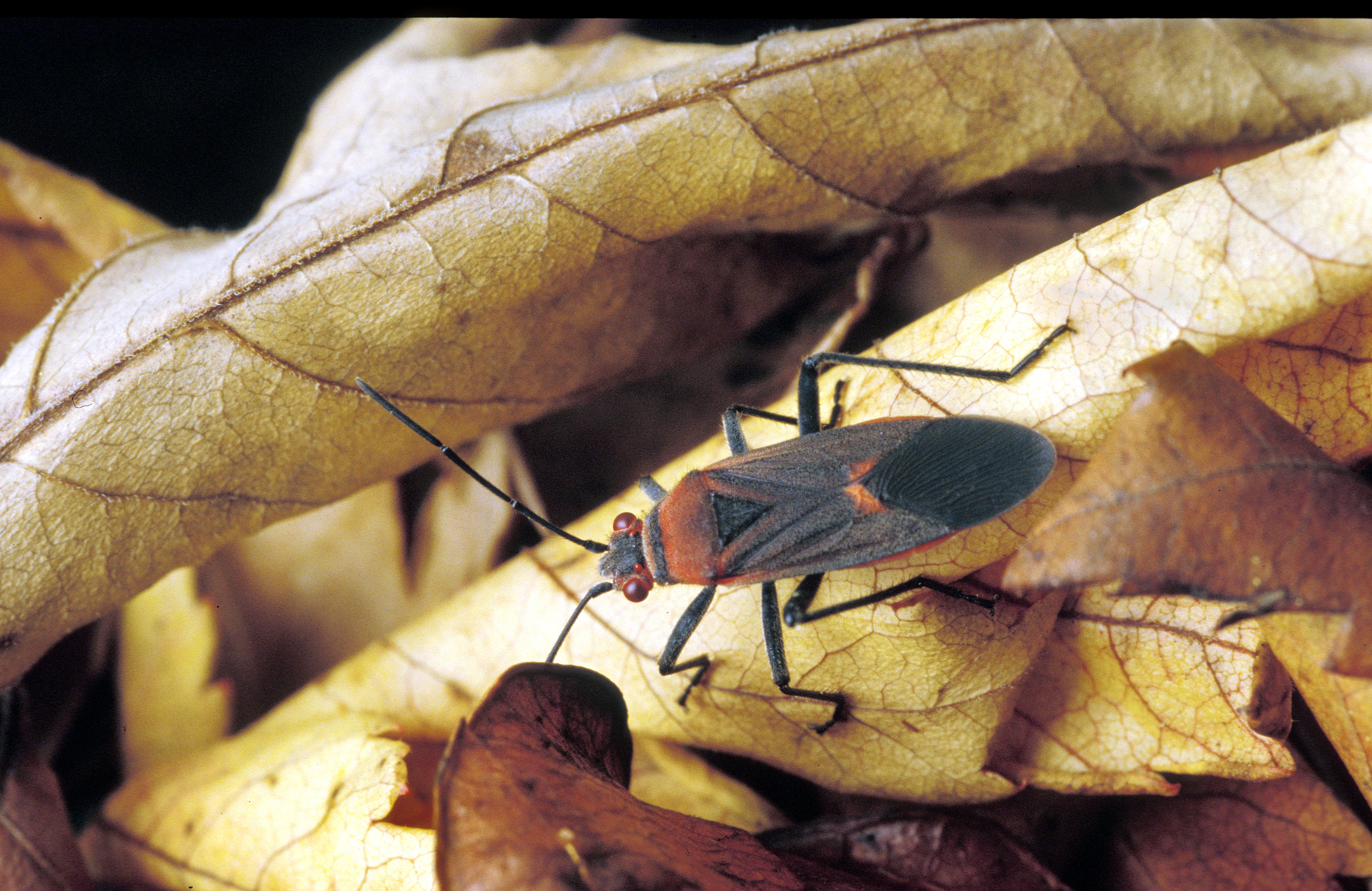
Leptocoris mitellatus, Australia.

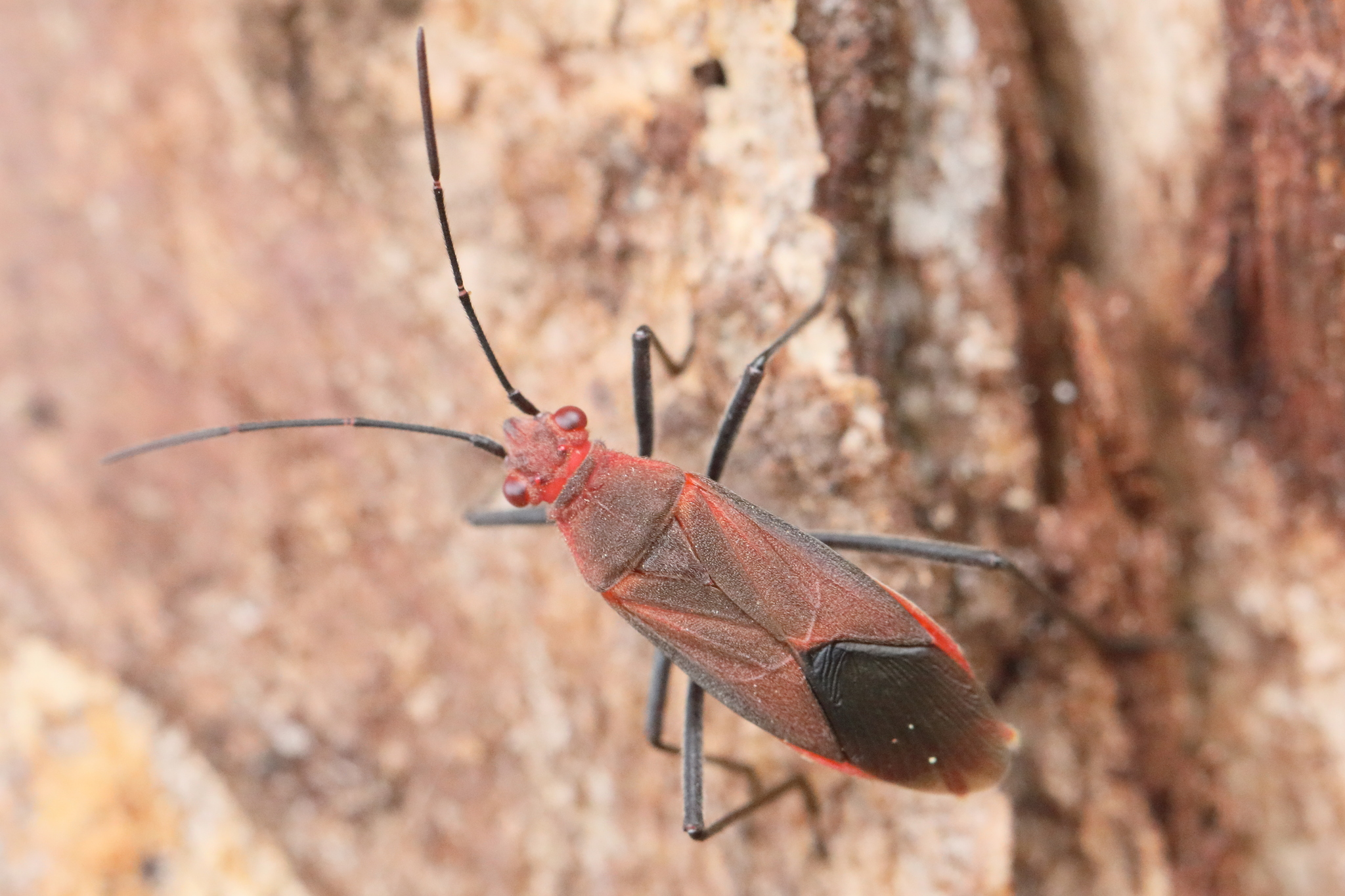
Leptocoris tagalicus, Australia.

== Species ==
The Coreoidea Species File lists:

1. Leptocoris abdominalis (Fabricius, 1803)
2. Leptocoris aethiops (Distant, 1901)
3. Leptocoris affinis Göllner-Scheiding, 1980
4. Leptocoris albisoleata (Bergroth, 1912)
5. Leptocoris amictus Germar, 1838
6. Leptocoris augur (Fabricius, 1781)
7. Leptocoris bahram Kirkaldy, 1899
8. Leptocoris capitis (Hsiao, 1963)
9. Leptocoris chevreuxi (Noualhier, 1893)
10. Leptocoris cinnamonensis Izzard, 1960
11. Leptocoris corniculatus (Stål, 1867)
12. Leptocoris coxalis (Kirby, 1891)
13. Leptocoris dispar (Hsiao, 1963)
14. Leptocoris griseiventris (Westwood, 1842)
15. Leptocoris hexophthalmus (Thunberg, 1784)
16. Leptocoris insularis Kirkaldy, 1908
17. Leptocoris intermedius (Distant, 1914)
18. Leptocoris isolatus (Distant, 1914)
19. Leptocoris lanuginosus (Lethierry, 1881)
20. Leptocoris latus Göllner-Scheiding, 1980
21. Leptocoris longiusculus (Walker, 1872)
22. Leptocoris marquesensis Cheesman, 1926
23. Leptocoris minusculus Blöte, 1934
24. Leptocoris mitellatus Bergroth, 1916
25. Leptocoris mutilatus (Gerstaecker, 1873)
26. Leptocoris nigrofasciatus (Distant, 1914)
27. Leptocoris obscurus Göllner-Scheiding, 1980
28. Leptocoris paramictus Göllner-Scheiding, 1980
29. Leptocoris pectoralis Schouteden, 1948
30. Leptocoris productus Göllner-Scheiding, 1980
31. Leptocoris rubrolineatus Barber, 1956
32. Leptocoris rufomarginatus (Fabricius, 1794)
33. Leptocoris rufus, type species
34. Leptocoris seidenstueckeri Göllner-Scheiding, 1980
35. Leptocoris stehliki Göllner-Scheiding, 1980
36. Leptocoris subrufescens (Kirby, 1888)
37. Leptocoris tagalicus Burmeister, 1834
38. Leptocoris teyrovskyi Göllner-Scheiding, 1980
39. Leptocoris toricollis (Bergroth, 1893)
40. Leptocoris ursulae Perreira, Carroll & Loye, 2012
41. Leptocoris verticalis Göllner-Scheiding, 1982
42. Leptocoris vicinus (Dallas, 1852)
43. Leptocoris wagneri Göllner-Scheiding, 1980
