= Jadera hinnulea =

Scientific classification
- Domain: Eukaryota
- Kingdom: Animalia
- Phylum: Arthropoda
- Class: Insecta
- Order: Hemiptera
- Suborder: Heteroptera
- Family: Rhopalidae
- Genus: Jadera
- Species: J. hinnulea

Binomial name
- Jadera hinnulea Göllner-Scheiding, 1979

Species of true bug

Jadera hinnulea is a species of soapberry bug in the family Rhopalidae. It is found in Central America and North America.
