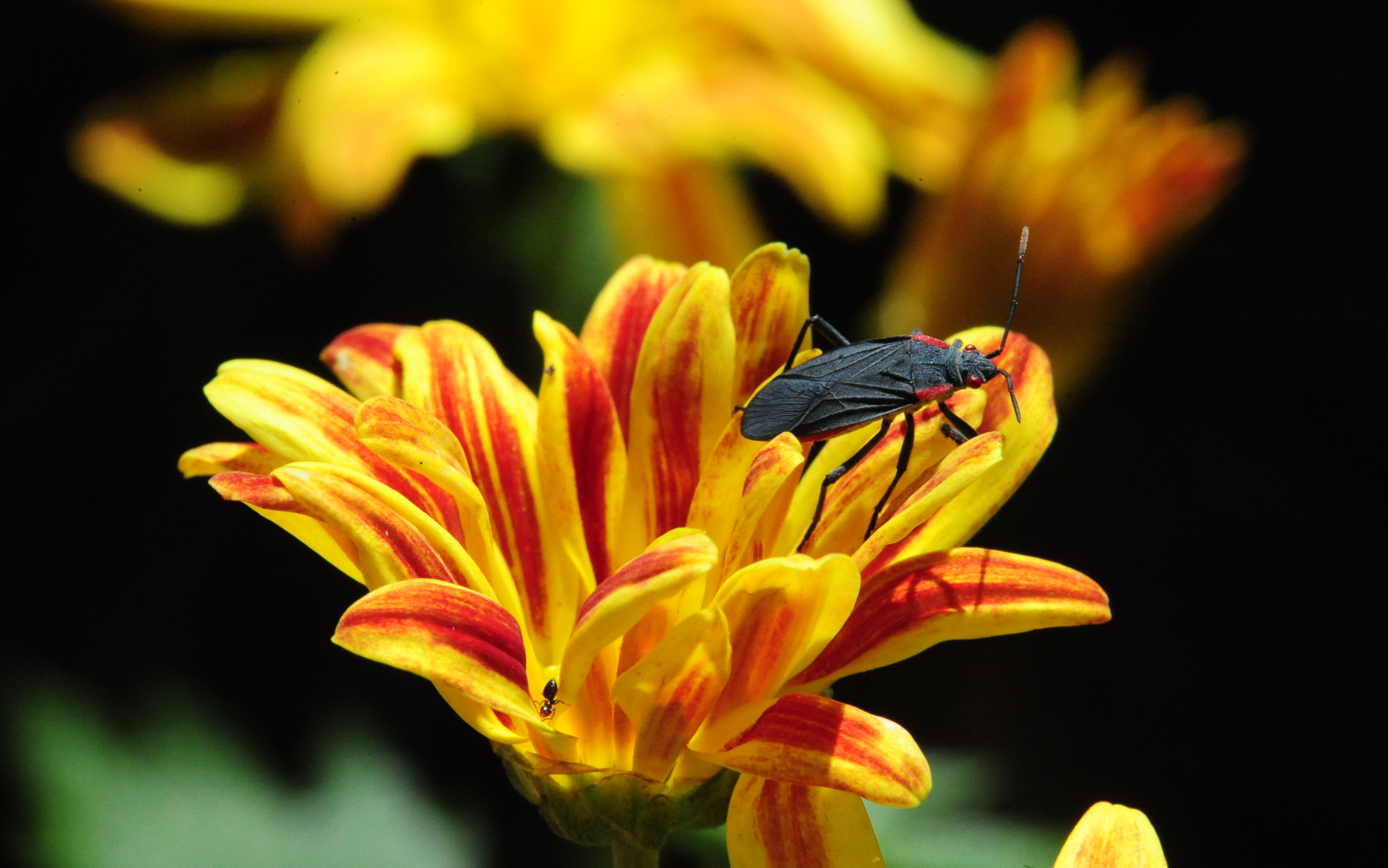

Scientific classification
- Kingdom: Animalia
- Phylum: Arthropoda
- Class: Insecta
- Order: Hemiptera
- Suborder: Heteroptera
- Family: Rhopalidae
- Genus: Jadera
- Species: J. haematoloma

Binomial name
- Jadera haematoloma (Herrich-Schäffer, 1847)

= Jadera haematoloma =

Species of true bug

Jadera haematoloma, the red-shouldered bug, goldenrain-tree bug or soapberry bug is a species of true bug that lives throughout the United States and south to northern South America. It feeds on seeds within the soapberry plant family, Sapindaceae, and is known to rapidly adapt to feeding on particular hosts. The species is often confused with boxelder bugs and lovebugs.

== Description ==
Jadera haematoloma are typically 9.5–13.5 millimetres (0.37–0.53 in) long and 3–4 millimetres (0.12–0.16 in) wide, though the short-winged form (brachyptera) usually is 7–8 millimetres (0.28–0.31 in) long. Color is mostly blackish (sometimes, bluish grey, or purplish, or bright red immediately after molting) except for red eyes, "shoulders" (lateral margins of pronotum), and costal margins and dorsal part of abdomen. Nymphs are mostly red with a black pronotum and wingpads. All appendages are blackish.

== Distribution ==
For most of the twentieth century, little was known about the range of J. haematoloma. Reports showed breeding populations to be present in Florida, Kansas, Colorado, Texas, Arizona, California, Alabama, Illinois, North Carolina, Missouri, Iowa, as well as Georgia, South Carolina, Tennessee, Virginia, Pennsylvania, Maryland, and Royal Oak, Michigan. A study published in 1987 showed the distribution of J. haematoloma and "revealed the close correspondence of records for the bug with the ranges of the soapberry plants that serve as the insects native hosts." In addition, isolated examples have been reported as far north as Minnesota. Outside of the United States, J. haematoloma is found south through Central America and the West Indies to Colombia and Venezuela.

Although native to the New World, the discovery of J. haematoloma populations in Taiwan in 2012 marked the first finding of the species and genus in Asia.

== Reproduction ==
It is extremely common to see pairs of the bugs joined tail to tail. Males outnumber females by about two to one, so that as an evolutionary strategy, the males prolong copulation for about two days, thereby preventing sperm competition.

== Evolution ==
Two populations in southern Florida are particularly notable. The more southern of these two populations feeds on the seeds of a native host vine balloon vine (Cardiospermum corindum). This vine produces capsules of a fairly uniform size, which adult J. haematoloma feed on by inserting their mouthparts (beak) through the capsule's exterior and into the interior seeds. In the mid-1950s, a related southeast Asian tree, the Taiwanese Flamegold (Koelreuteria elegans), was introduced as an ornamental plant. It escaped domestication and naturalized. Significantly, the Flamegold was colonized by J. haematoloma, though its capsules are smaller and the seeds less deeply embedded than in the balloon vine.

In a seminal paper published in the scientific journal Genetica in 2001, it was shown evolution had taken place in this colonizing population of J. haematoloma on the Flamegold in a period of only a few decades. They showed that the beak length, which in the ancestral type was about 70% the length of the body, was only about 50% the body length in the insects that had colonized the non-native tree, though the size of the bugs themselves had not changed. In addition, they found that:

...derived bugs mature 25% more rapidly, are 20% more likely to survive, and lay almost twice as many eggs when reared on seeds of the introduced host rather than those of the native host. Fecundity is also twice as great as that of ancestral type bugs reared on either host, while egg mass is 20% smaller.
