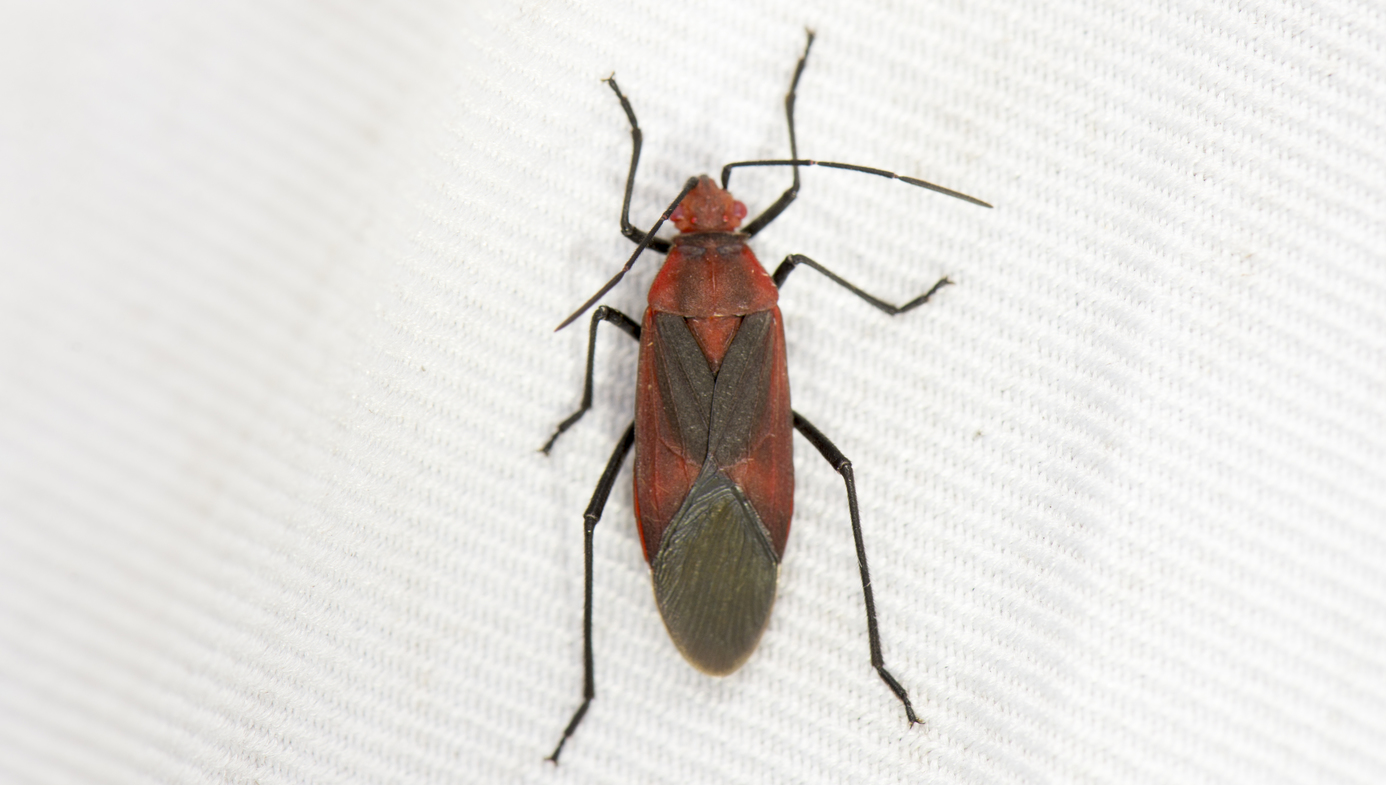

Scientific classification
- Kingdom: Animalia
- Phylum: Arthropoda
- Class: Insecta
- Order: Hemiptera
- Suborder: Heteroptera
- Family: Rhopalidae
- Genus: Leptocoris
- Species: L. vicinus

Binomial name
- Leptocoris vicinus Dallas, 1852

= Leptocoris vicinus =

Species of insect

Leptocoris vicinus is a species of soapberry bug found in the Philippines, Taiwan, Japan, and throughout Southeast Asia, as well as in Oceania and Australia.

== Description ==
The dorsum of L. vicinus is red, with a black membrane and blackish clavus that forms a 'v' shape around the scutellum. The pronotum may also have black markings. The ventral side of the insect is black with red margins around the abdomen. Its coxae, legs, and antennae are also black.

== Feeding ==
Leptocoris vicinus larvae and adults feed on the seeds of Cardiospermum halicacabum, Koelreuteria elegans, Pometia pinnata, and Schleichera oleosa. In Taiwan, they are often found on and around Taiwanese rain trees, a popular ornamental tree planted extensively along roads in major cities in the country.
