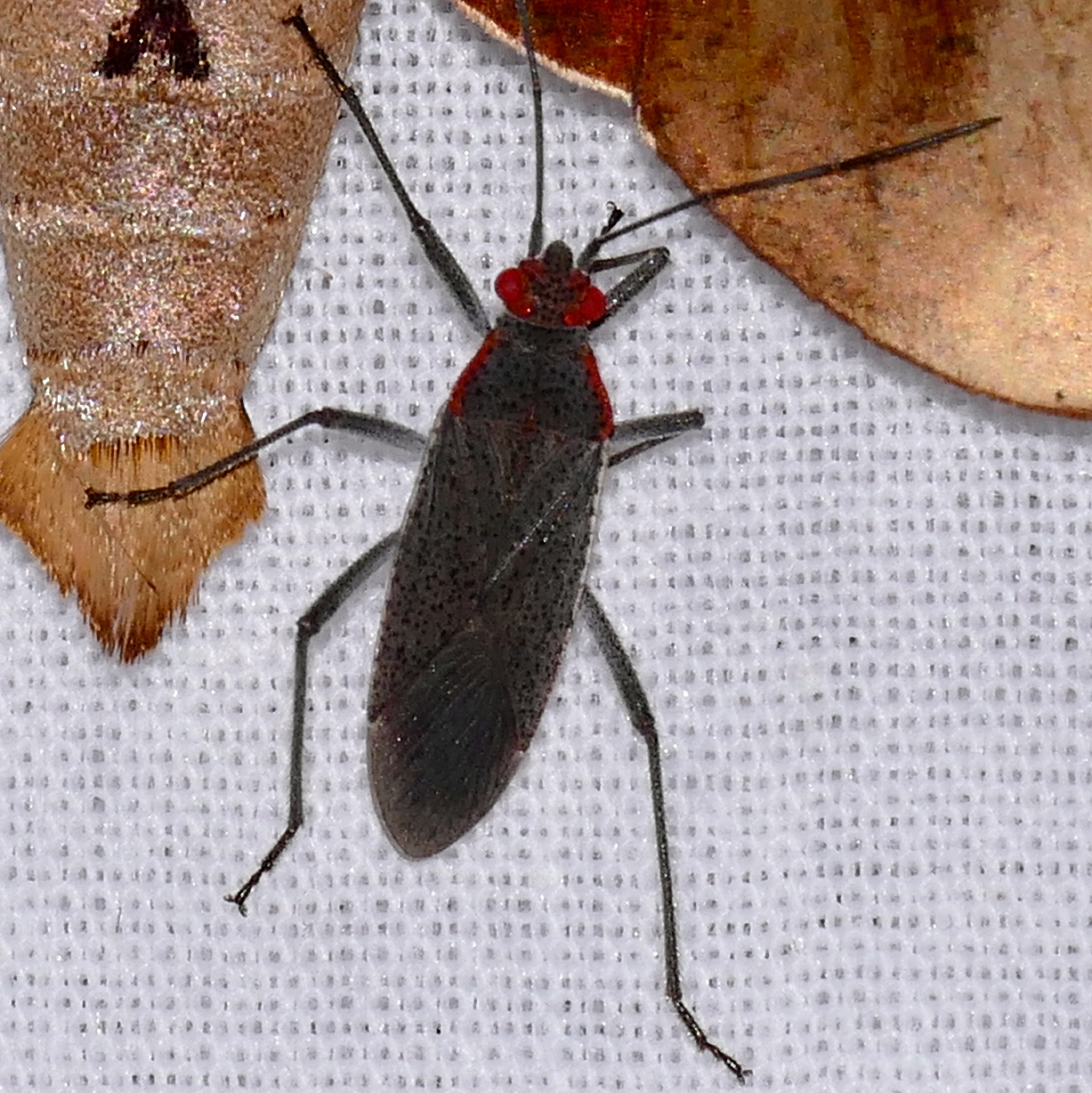

Scientific classification
- Kingdom: Animalia
- Phylum: Arthropoda
- Class: Insecta
- Order: Hemiptera
- Suborder: Heteroptera
- Family: Rhopalidae
- Genus: Jadera
- Species: J. coturnix

Binomial name
- Jadera coturnix (Burmeister, 1835)

Synonyms
- Leptocoris coturnix Burmeister, 1835

= Jadera coturnix =

Species of true bug

Jadera coturnix is a species of soapberry bug in the family Rhopalidae. It is found in North America, Central America, and South America.

== Subspecies ==
These two subspecies belong to the species Jadera coturnix:

- Jadera coturnix coturnix (Burmeister, 1835)
- Jadera coturnix rufoculis (Kirby, 1890)
