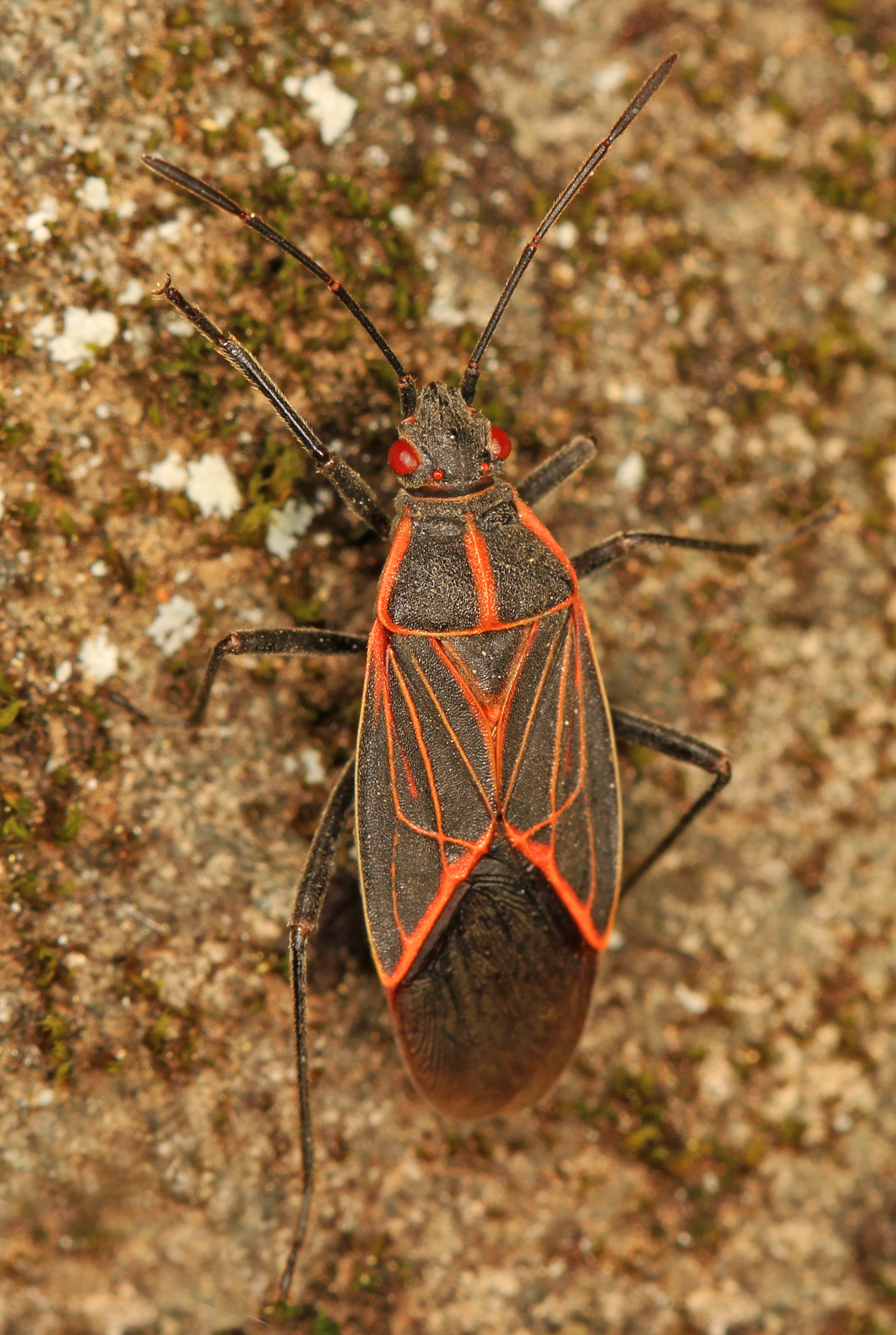

Scientific classification
- Domain: Eukaryota
- Kingdom: Animalia
- Phylum: Arthropoda
- Class: Insecta
- Order: Hemiptera
- Suborder: Heteroptera
- Family: Rhopalidae
- Genus: Boisea
- Species: B. rubrolineata

Binomial name
- Boisea rubrolineata (Barber, 1956)

Synonyms
- Leptocoris rubrolineata

= Boisea rubrolineata =

Species of true bug

Boisea rubrolineata or the western boxelder bug is identical to the eastern boxelder bug aside from having prominent red veins on its corium. It is found in western North America. Adults are 9–13 mm in length. The thorax and wings are black with red lines, and the abdomen is red. Nymphs are bright red and gray. Both nymphs and adults feed on boxelder. In fall and winter, adults might be noted migrating indoors to hibernate.
