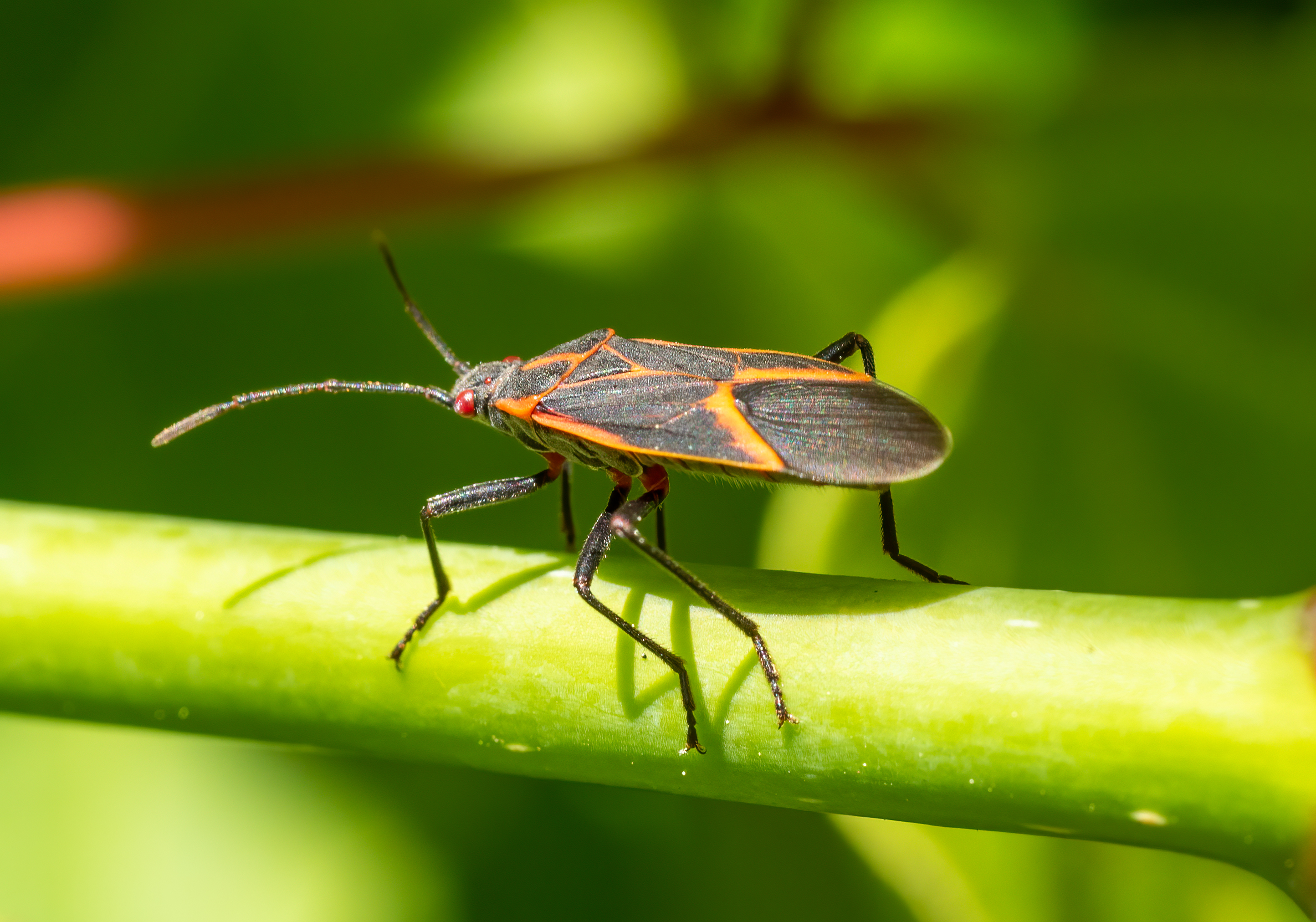

Scientific classification
- Kingdom: Animalia
- Phylum: Arthropoda
- Class: Insecta
- Order: Hemiptera
- Suborder: Heteroptera
- Family: Rhopalidae
- Genus: Boisea
- Species: B. trivittata

Binomial name
- Boisea trivittata (Say, 1825)

Synonyms
- Leptocoris trivittatus

= Boisea trivittata =

Species of true bug

Boisea trivittata, also called the eastern boxelder bug, box bug, or maple bug, is a species of true bug native to eastern North America. The western boxelder bug, Boisea rubrolineata, is a relative of this species and is native to western North America. Eastern boxelder bugs are found primarily on boxelder, other maples, and ash trees.

== Etymology ==
Trivittata is from the Latin tri (three) + vittata (banded).

== Biology and description ==
The adults are about 13 millimetres (0.51 in) long with a dark brown or black coloration, relieved by red wing veins and markings on the abdomen, with dark red eyes; nymphs are bright red.

Eastern boxelder bugs feed almost entirely on the developing seeds of boxelder, maple, and ash trees.

Eastern boxelder bugs feed, lay eggs and develop on boxelder trees, most commonly occurring on female trees as they produce seeds. Eastern boxelder bugs prefer seeds; however, they also suck leaves. They can be frequently observed on maples, as these trees provide them with seeds as well. Eastern boxelder bugs overwinter in plant debris or protected human-inhabited places and other suitable structures.

== Taxonomy and similar species ==
The eastern boxelder bug is sometimes confused with insects belonging to the genera Jadera, Pyrrhocoris, and Melacoryphus.

They may also be confused with the western boxelder bug (Boisea rubrolineata) which are near relatives in the same genus.

The name "stink bug", which is more regularly applied to the family Pentatomidae, is sometimes incorrectly used to refer to Boisea trivittata. Instead, eastern boxelder bugs belong to the family Rhopalidae, the so-called "scentless plant bugs". However, eastern boxelder bugs are strong-smelling and, to discourage predators, will release a pungent and bad-tasting compound upon being disturbed. This allows them to form conspicuous aggregations without being preyed on.

Eastern boxelder bugs are also sometimes confused with milkweed bugs, genus Lygaeus, for having a similar appearance.

== Range ==
Eastern boxelder bugs are a native species in North America.

The current range of this species covers the eastern United States, southern Canada, Mexico, and south into Guatemala. There have also been many sightings of them in South Africa. However, there is a high chance that these individuals are part of the species Boisea fulcrata, another related species.

In 2020, this species was accidentally introduced in Chile and has become an invasive species in the country's central region, especially in Santiago. The introduction follows the ornamental use of maple trees in Chilean residential areas and suburbs.

== Overwintering, sometimes in homes ==
Eastern boxelder bugs are not universally considered pests within their native range. Eastern boxelder bugs are harmless to people and pets.

During certain times of the year, eastern boxelder bugs cluster together in large groups while sunning themselves on warm surfaces near their host tree (e.g. on rocks, shrubs, trees, and man-made structures).

This is especially a problem in the fall when they are seeking a warm place to overwinter. Large numbers are often seen congregating on houses seeking an entry point.

If they gain access, they remain inactive behind siding and inside of walls while the weather is cool.

Once the home's heating system becomes active for the season, the insects may falsely perceive it to be springtime and enter inhabited parts of the home in search of food and water if there are any openings that allow them to do so. Once inside inhabited areas of a home, their excreta may stain upholstery, carpets, and drapes, and they may feed on certain types of houseplants.

In the spring, the bugs leave their winter hibernation locations to feed and lay eggs on maple or ash trees. Clustered masses of eastern boxelder bugs may be seen again at this time, and depending on the temperature, throughout the summer.

Some people perceive their outdoor congregation habits and indoor excreta deposits as a nuisance; therefore, eastern boxelder bugs are often considered pests in those contexts.

The removal of boxelder trees and maple trees can help control boxelder bug populations, but can also result in the loss of a native tree.

Providing ample native woodland or other natural landscape helps eastern boxelder bugs overwinter without becoming a nuisance, along with helping many other species within the same ecosystem, such as ground bees, also native to North America.

== Relationship to agriculture and gardening ==
Although they specialize in eating the seeds from maple, boxelder and ash, they may pierce other parts of the plant while feeding, but incidentally.

They are not classified as an agricultural pest and are generally not considered injurious to ornamental plantings.

They damage some fruits in the fall when they leave their summer quarters in trees and seek areas to overwinter. Feeding by the bugs produces dimples, scars, fruit deformation, corky tissue, and even premature fruit-drop in strawberries and some tree fruits. But they are not major agricultural pests.

== Predation by other animals ==
Spiders are minor predators, but because of the boxelder bug's chemical defenses, few birds or other animals will eat them. No major diseases or parasites affect Boxelder bug populations.

== Gallery ==
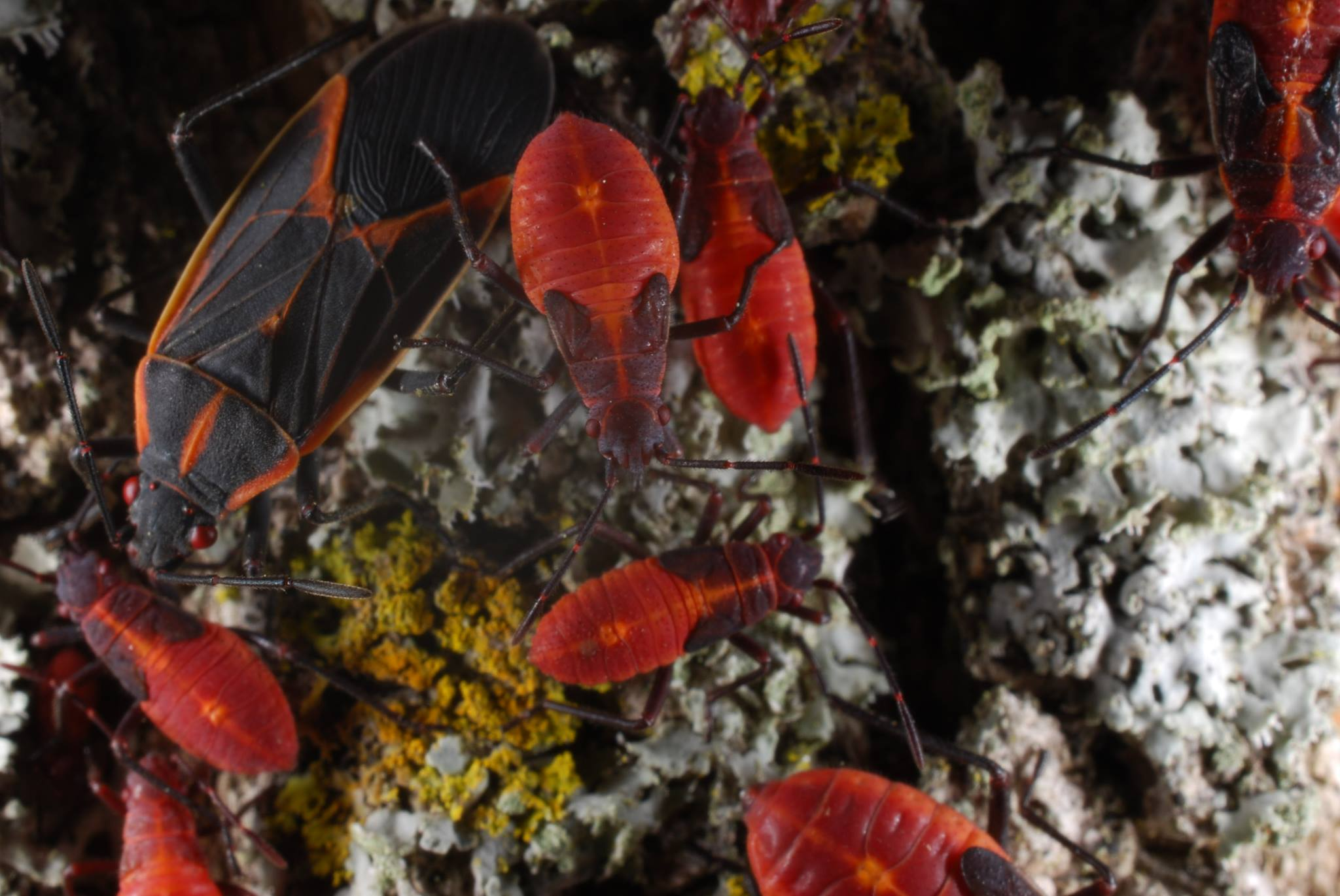

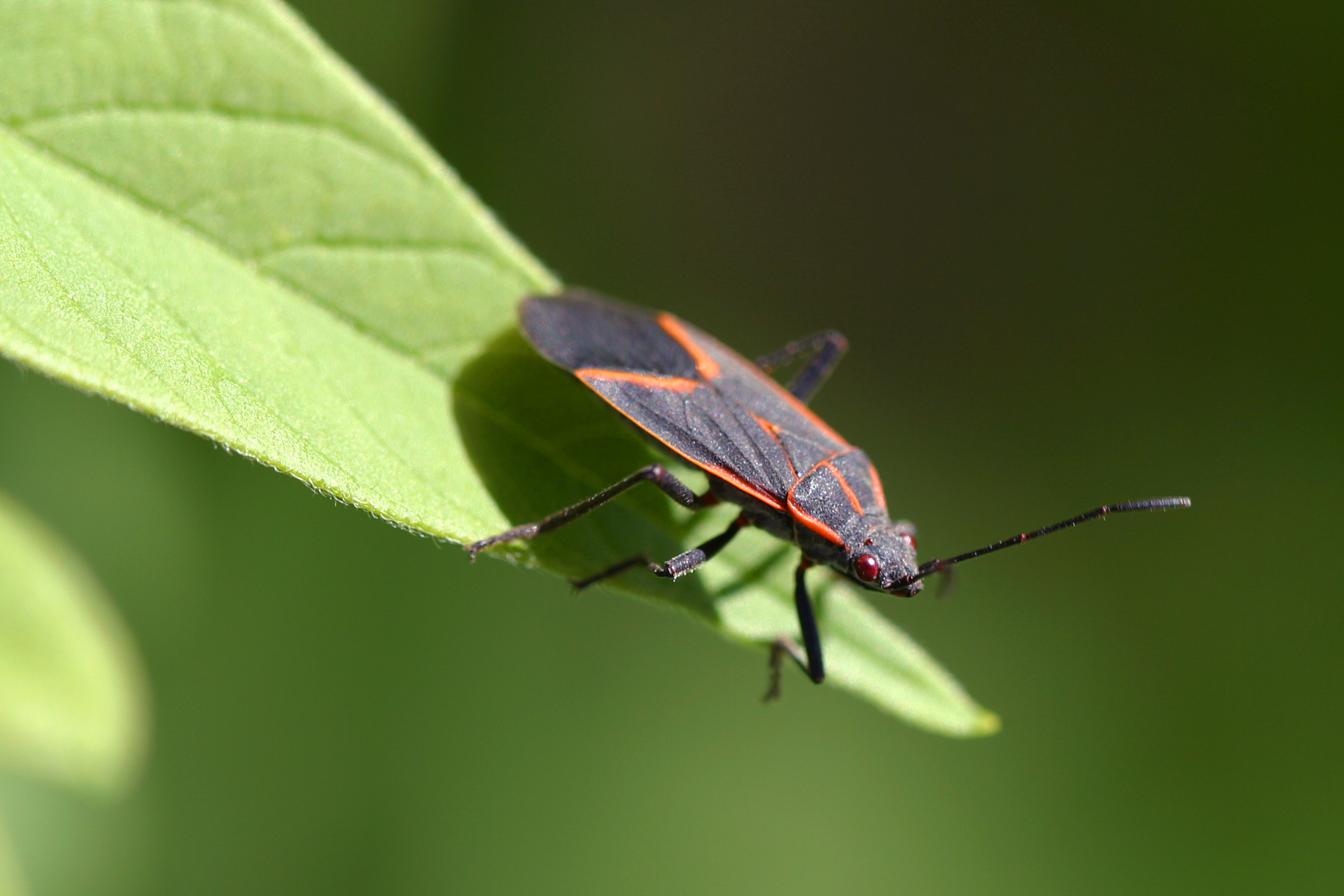

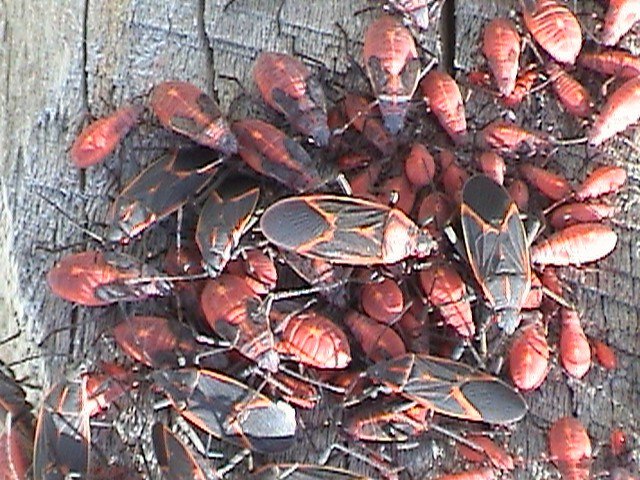

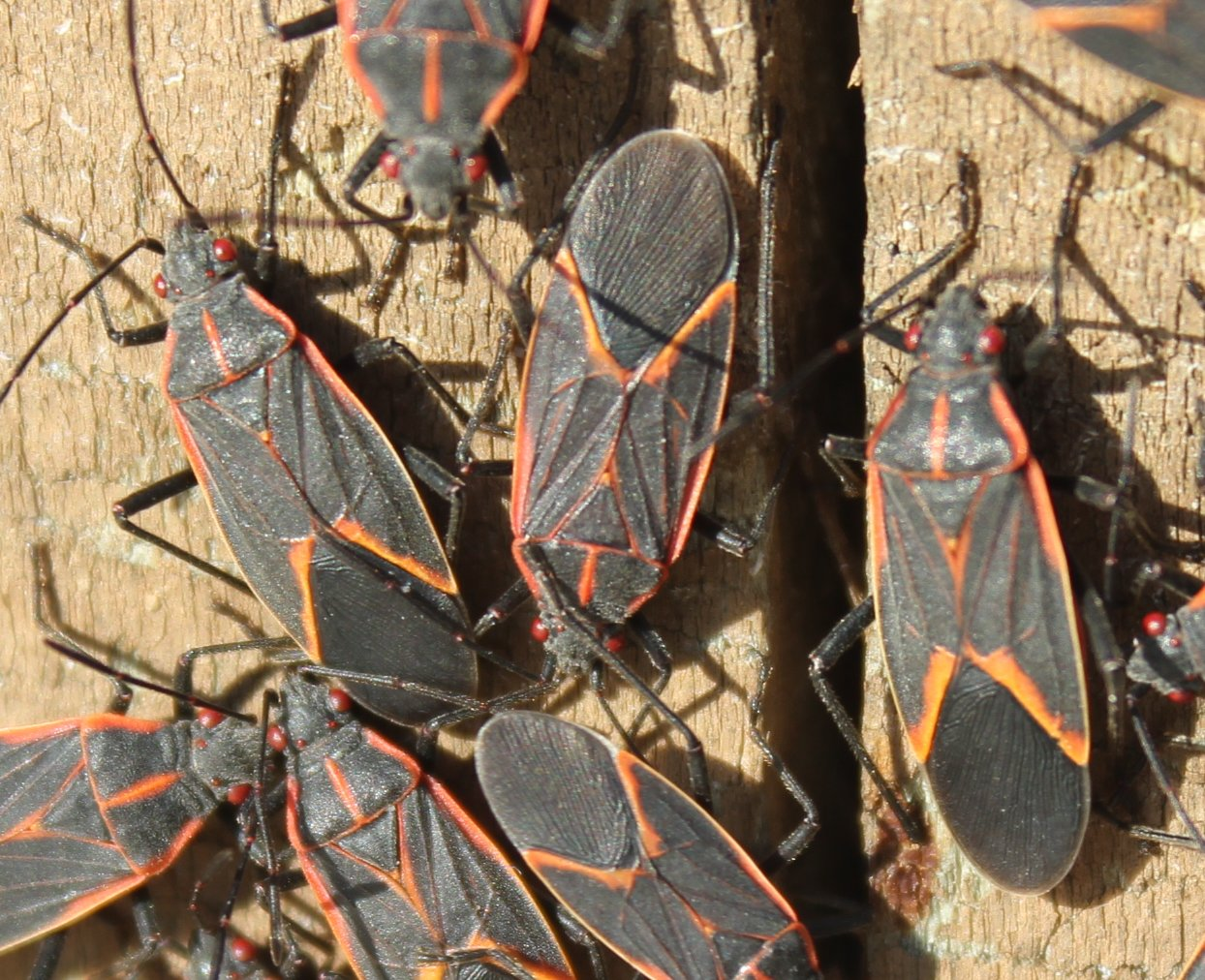

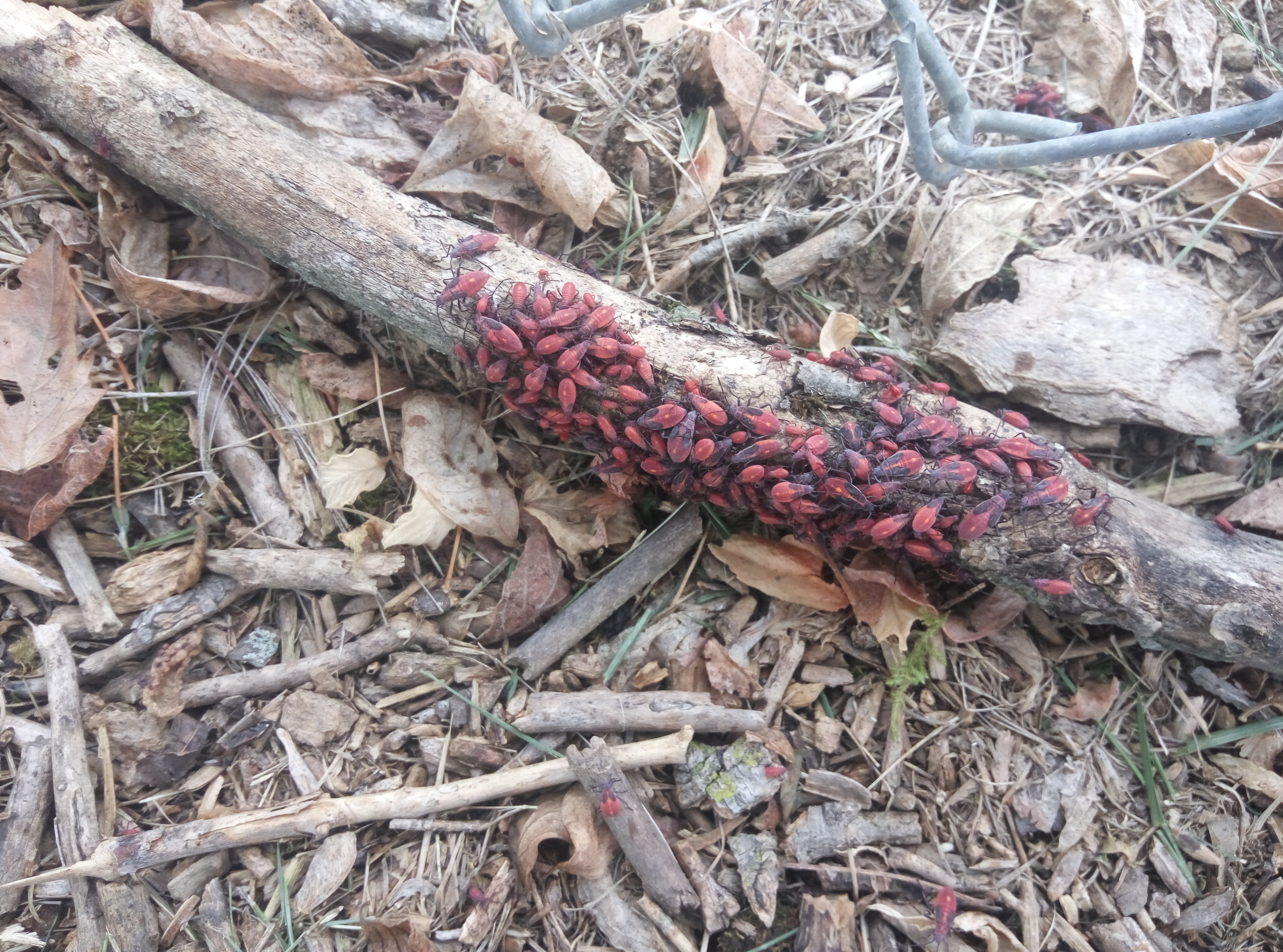
Large group of eastern boxelder bugs found on a fallen limb

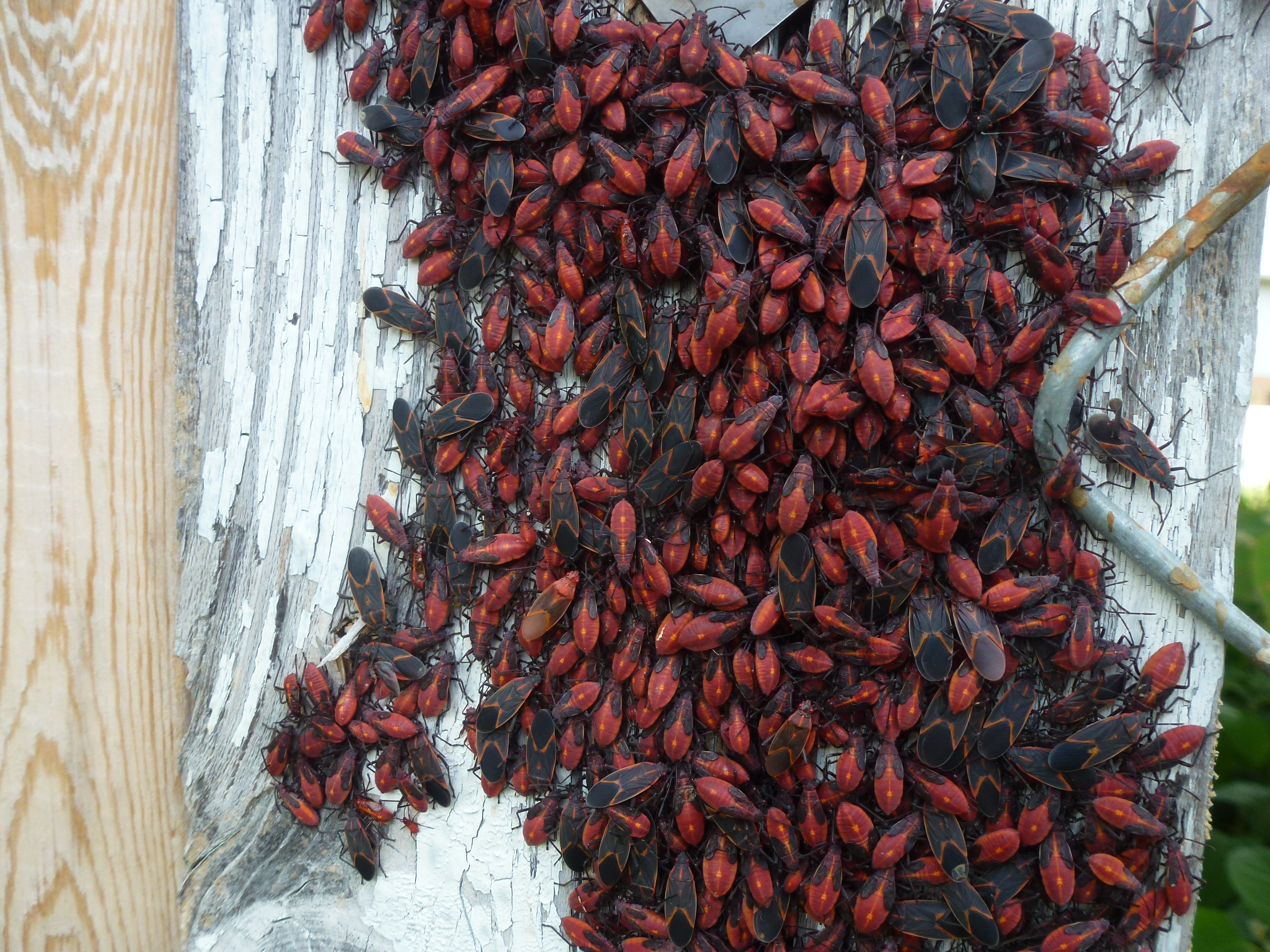
A mass of eastern boxelder bugs on a fencepost in Bolton, Ontario, in September 2018
