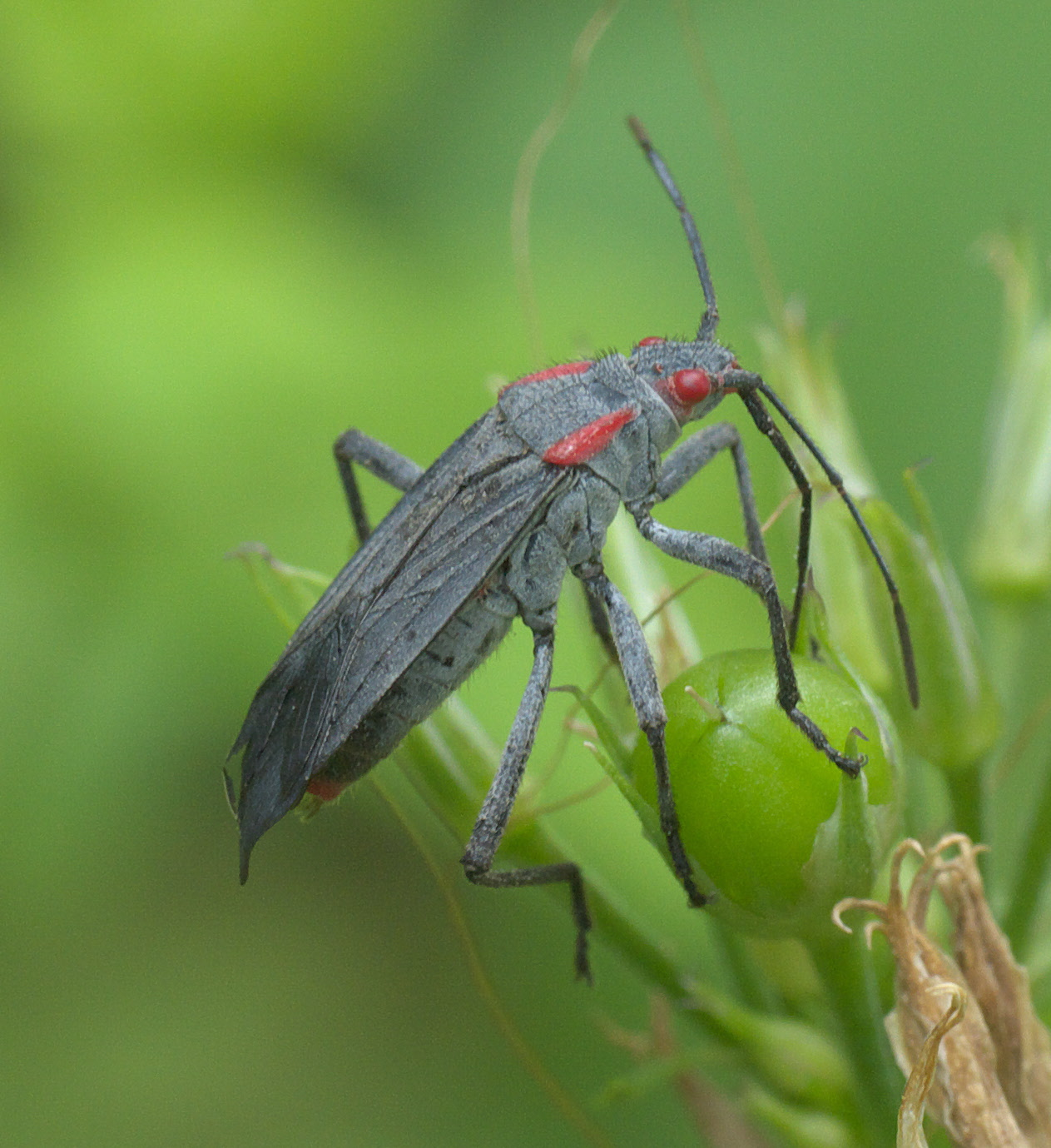
- Jadera haematoloma

Scientific classification
- Kingdom: Animalia
- Phylum: Arthropoda
- Clade: Pancrustacea
- Class: Insecta
- Order: Hemiptera
- Suborder: Heteroptera
- Family: Rhopalidae
- Subfamily: Serinethinae
- Genus: Jadera; Stål, 1862

= Jadera =

Genus of true bugs

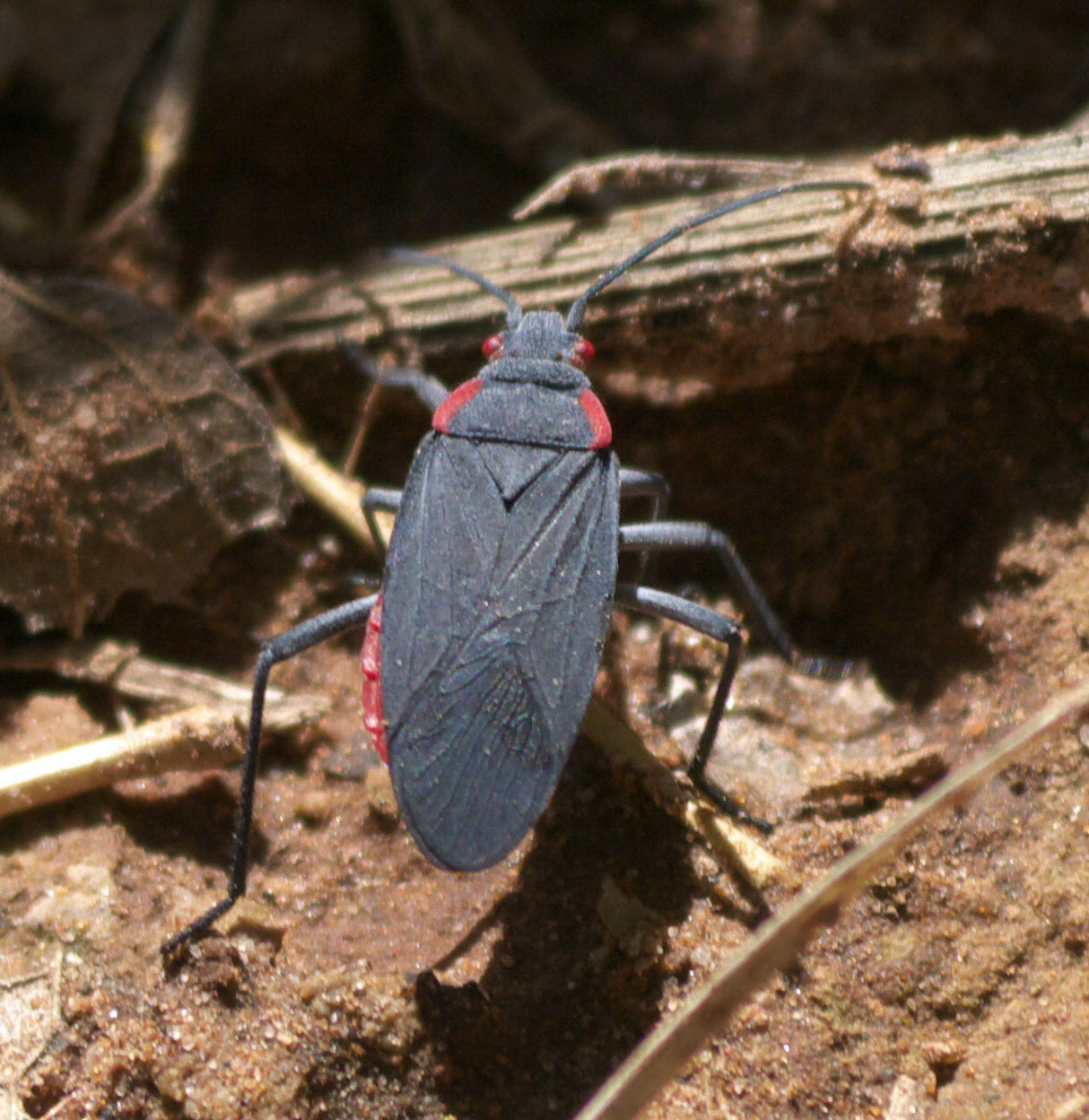
Jadera haematoloma

Jadera is a genus of true bugs in the soapberry bug subfamily. Members of this genus are only found in the Americas (from southern Canada through Argentina).

== Species ==
These 19 species belong to the genus Jadera:

- Jadera antica (Walker, 1872)^{i c g}
- Jadera bayardae
- Jadera choprai Göllner-Scheiding, 1979^{c g}
- Jadera coturnix (Burmeister, 1835)^{i c g b}
- Jadera decipiens Göllner-Scheiding, 1979^{c g}
- Jadera diaphona Göllner-Scheiding, 1982^{c g}
- Jadera golbachi Göllner-Scheiding, 1979^{c g}
- Jadera haematoloma (Herrich-Schaeffer, 1847)^{i c g b} (red-shouldered bug)
- Jadera harrisi Göllner-Scheiding, 1979^{c g}
- Jadera hinnulea Göllner-Scheiding, 1979^{i c g b}
- Jadera obscura (Westwood, 1842)^{c g}
- Jadera parapectoralis Göllner-Scheiding, 1979^{c g}
- Jadera pectoralis Stal, 1862^{c g}
- Jadera peruviana Göllner-Scheiding, 1982^{c g}
- Jadera pyrrholoma Stal, 1870^{c g}
- Jadera sanguinolenta (Fabricius, 1775)^{c g}
- Jadera schuhi Göllner-Scheiding, 1979^{c g}
- Jadera silbergliedi Froeschner, 1985^{c g}
- Jadera similaris Göllner-Scheiding, 1979^{c g}

Data sources: i = ITIS, c = Catalogue of Life, g = GBIF, b = Bugguide.net
