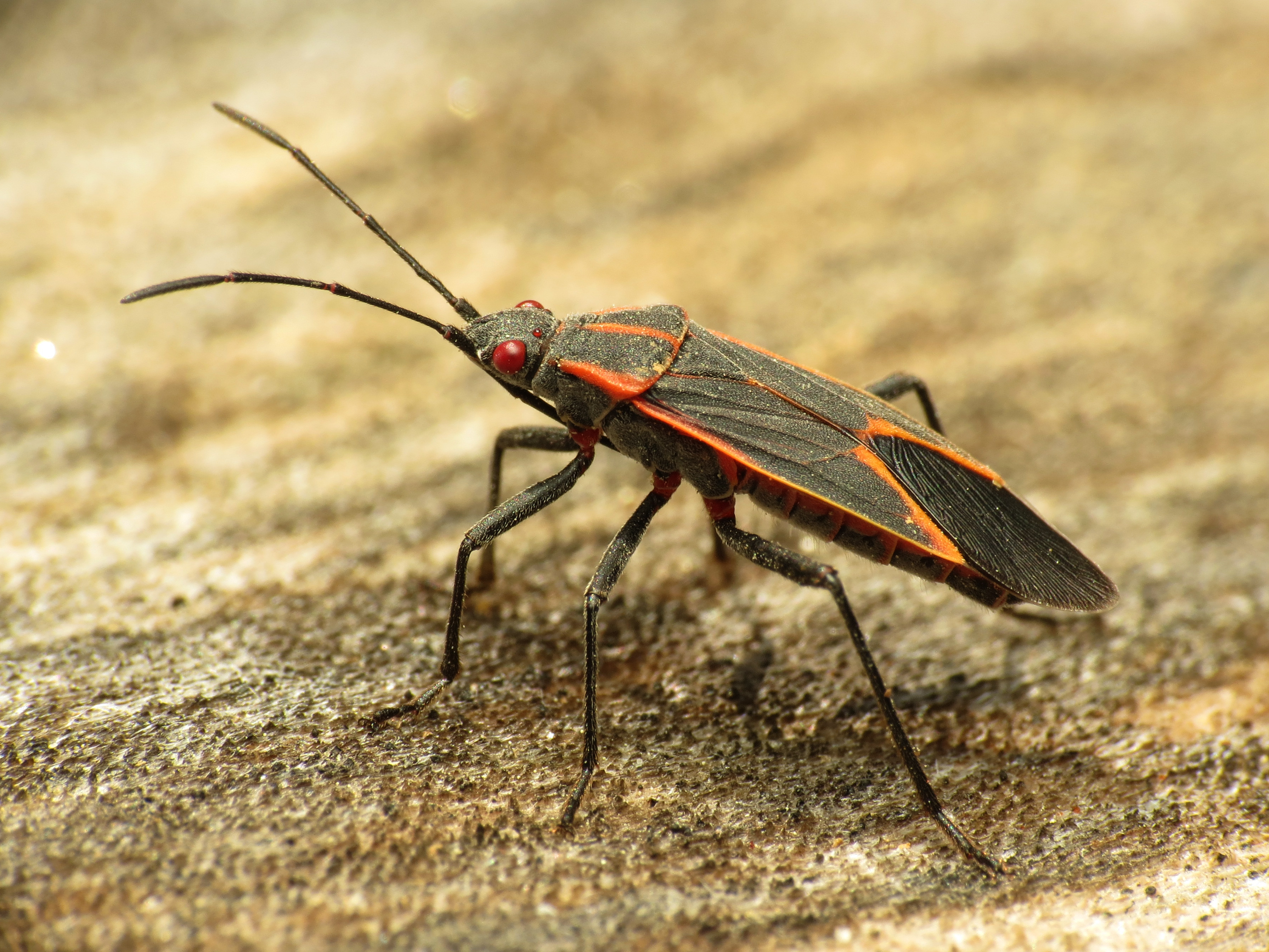
- Boisea trivittata

Scientific classification
- Kingdom: Animalia
- Phylum: Arthropoda
- Clade: Pancrustacea
- Class: Insecta
- Order: Hemiptera
- Suborder: Heteroptera
- Family: Rhopalidae
- Subfamily: Serinethinae
- Genus: Boisea; Kirkaldy, 1910

Species
- Boisea coimbatorensis; Boisea fulcrata; Boisea rubrolineata; Boisea trivittata

= Boisea =

Genus of true bugs

Boisea is the least speciose genus of the soapberry bug subfamily. Members of this genus are found in North America, India, and Africa. Unlike other serinethine genera, the distribution of Boisea is very patchy; it is speculated that its highly vicariant range is relictual of what was previously a much vaster, continuous range. The most well-known species of this genus are the North American boxelder bugs (western Boisea rubrolineata and eastern Boisea trivittata) and African Boisea fulcrata. The US species mainly feed on the seeds of maple trees and are occasional nuisance pests around homes.

As adults, the insects stay on the ground during cold mornings, huddling together for warmth in a very low-activity, sluggish state, appearing to be dead. If the sun becomes visible, they will become more active, climbing nearby houses, trees, and other natural or man-made structures to sunbathe. This is where their classification as nuisance pests derives.

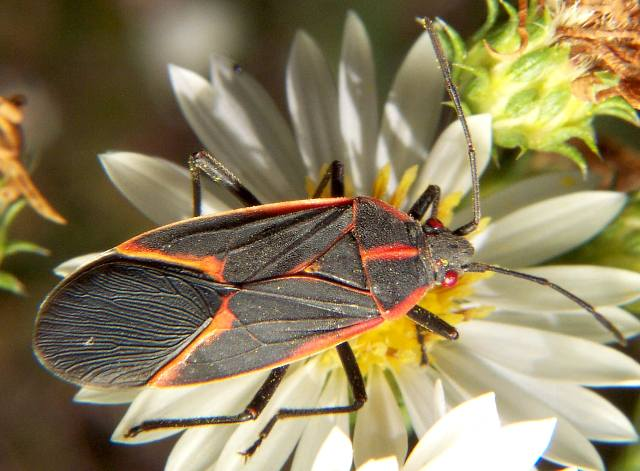
Boisea trivittata

In North America, Boisea trivittata is native to most of the continental United States, excluding California and the Pacific Northwest, and also in center and Eastern regions of Canada, such as Ontario, Quebec, parts of Manitoba and the Atlantic Provinces. Boisea rubrolineata is native to western continental Canada, found in the distribution area of boxelder maple, such as the provinces of Saskatchewan, Alberta and British Columbia, as well as the western states of California, Oregon, Washington, and Idaho in the United States.

Exocrine secretions of these bugs have also been extensively studied.
