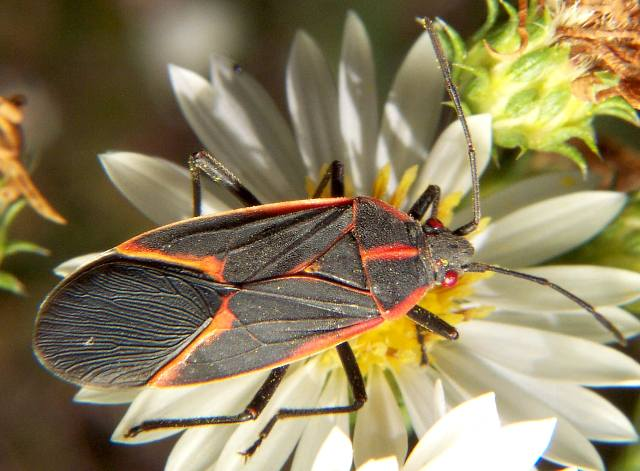
- Box elder bug, Boisea trivittata

Scientific classification
- Kingdom: Animalia
- Phylum: Arthropoda
- Clade: Pancrustacea
- Class: Insecta
- Order: Hemiptera
- Suborder: Heteroptera
- Superfamily: Coreoidea
- Family: Rhopalidae
- Subfamily: Serinethinae; Stål, 1862

Synonyms
- Leptocorinae Van Duzee, 1914; Leptocorini Van Duzee, 1914; Serinetharia Stål, 1873

= Serinethinae =

Subfamily of true bugs

Serinethinae is a subfamily of the hemipteran family Rhopalidae, sometimes known as soapberry bugs. They are brightly colored seed-eaters, comprising three genera and about sixty-five species. These bugs are specialists on plants in the soapberry family (Sapindaceae), which includes maples, balloon vines, and soapberry trees, among others. Seeds of the plants are the main resource used by adults for reproduction and nymphs for growth and development. Their diversity is the result of an adaptive radiation on these plants, who have co-evolved defenses such as having their seeds contain cyanide, fly out, or be contained in hollow chambers.

== Genera ==
The Coreoidea Species File includes:

1. Boisea Kirkaldy, 1910
2. Jadera Stål, 1862
3. Leptocoris Hahn, 1833

Leptocoris, the largest genus, includes more than 40 species, found in Oceania, Australia, Asia, and Africa. Several species of Leptocoris are known as soapberry bugs in Australia, notably Leptocoris mitellatus.

The New World genus Jadera consists of nearly 20 species that range naturally from Kansas to southern Argentina. Jadera haematoloma is a soapberry bug found in Florida known for its rapid adaptive evolution following the introduction of a non-native soapberry plant.

Boisea consists of four species, one in Africa, one in India, and two in North America, including the well-known box elder bug, Boisea trivittata.
