= List of Lygaeidae genera =

These 114 genera belong to the family Lygaeidae, seed bugs. There are at least 980 described species in Lygaeidae.

== Lygaeidae genera ==
- Aborsillus Barber, 1954
- Acanthocrompus Scudder, 1958
- Achlyosomus Slater Alex, 1992
- Acrobrachys Horvath, 1914
- Acroleucus Stal, 1874
- Aethalotus Stal, 1874
- Afraethalotus Scudder, 1963
- Anochrostomus Slater Alex, 1992
- Apterola Mulsant & Rey, 1866
- Arocatus Spinola, 1837
- Aspilocoryphus Stal, 1874
- Aspilogeton Breddin, 1901
- Astacops Boisduval, 1835
- Aulacopeltus Stal, 1868
- Austronysius Ashlock, 1967
- Balionysius Ashlock, 1967
- Belonochilus Uhler, 1871
- Biblochrimnus Brailovsky, 1982
- Caenocoris Fieber, 1860
- Camptocoris Puton, 1886
- Caprhiobia Scudder, 1962
- Cerocrompus Scudder, 1958
- Coleonysius Ashlock, 1967
- Congolorgus Scudder, 1962
- Cosmopleurus Stal, 1872
- Craspeduchus Stal, 1874
- Crompus Stal, 1874
- Cuyonysius Dellapé & Henry, 2020
- Dalmochrimnus Brailovsky, 1982
- Darwinysius Ashlock, 1967
- Ektyphonotus Slater Alex, 1992
- Emphanisis China, 1925
- Eurynysius Ashlock, 1967
- Glyptonysius Usinger, 1942
- Gondarius Stys, 1972
- Graptostethus Stal, 1868
- Hadrosomus Slater Alex, 1992
- Haematorrhytus Stal, 1874
- Haemobaphus Stal, 1874
- Hormopleurus Horvath, 1884
- Horvathiolus Josifov, 1965
- Hyalonysius Slater, 1962
- Karachicoris Stys, 1972
- Kleidocerys Stephens, 1829
- Koscocrompus Scudder, 1958
- Kualisompus Scudder, 1962
- Latochrimnus Brailovsky, 1982
- Lepionysius Ashlock, 1967
- Lepiorsillus Malipatil, 1979
- Lygaeites Heer, 1853
- Lygaeodema Horvath, 1924
- Lygaeosoma Spinola, 1837
- Lygaeospilus Barber, 1921
- Lygaeus Fabricius, 1794
- Madrorgus Scudder, 1962
- Melacoryphus Slater Alex, 1988
- Melanerythrus Stal, 1868
- Melanocoryphus Stal, 1872
- Melanopleuroides Slater & Baranowski, 2001
- Melanopleurus Stal, 1874
- Melanostethus Stal, 1868
- Melanotelus Reuter, 1885
- Metrarga White, 1878
- Microspilus Stal, 1868
- Neacoryphus Scudder, 1965
- Neocrompus China, 1930
- Neokleidocerys Scudder, 1962
- Neortholomus Hamilton, 1983
- Neseis Kirkaldy, 1910
- Nesoclimacias Kirkaldy, 1908
- Nesocryptias Kirkaldy, 1908
- Nesomartis Kirkaldy, 1907
- Nesostethus Kirkaldy, 1908
- Nicuesa Distant, 1893
- Nithecus Horvath, 1890
- Nysius Dallas, 1852 (false chinch bugs)
- Oceanides Kirkaldy, 1910
- Ochrimnus Stal, 1874
- Ochrostomus Stal, 1874
- Oncopeltus Stal, 1868
- Oreolorgus Scudder, 1962
- Oreonysius Usinger, 1952
- Orsillacis Barber, 1914
- Orsillus Dallas, 1852
- Ortholomus Stal, 1872
- Oxygranulobaphus Brailovsky, 1982
- Paranysius Horvath, 1895
- Polychisme Kirkaldy, 1904
- Pseudoacroleucoides Brailovsky, 1982
- Psileula Seidenstucker, 1964
- Pylorgus Stal, 1874
- Pyrrhobaphus Stal, 1868
- Reticulatonysius Malipatil, 2005
- Rhiophila Bergroth, 1918
- Rhypodes Stal, 1868
- Robinsonocoris Kormilev, 1952
- Scopiastella Slater, 1957
- Scopiastes Stal, 1874
- Sinorsillus Usinger, 1938
- Spilostethus Stal, 1868
- Stalagmostethus Stal, 1868
- Stenaptula Seidenstucker, 1964
- Stictocricus Horvath, 1914
- Syzygitis Bergroth, 1921
- Thunbergia Horvath, 1914 (thunberg seedbugs)
- Torvochrimnus Brailovsky, 1982
- Tropidothorax Bergroth, 1894
- Woodwardiastes Slater Alex, 1985
- Xyonysius Ashlock & Lattin, 1963
- Zygochrimnus Brailovsky, 2018
- † Lygaenocoris Popov, 1961
- † Mesolygaeus Ping, 1928
- † Oligacanthus Hong, 1980
- † Sinolygaeus Hong, 1980
