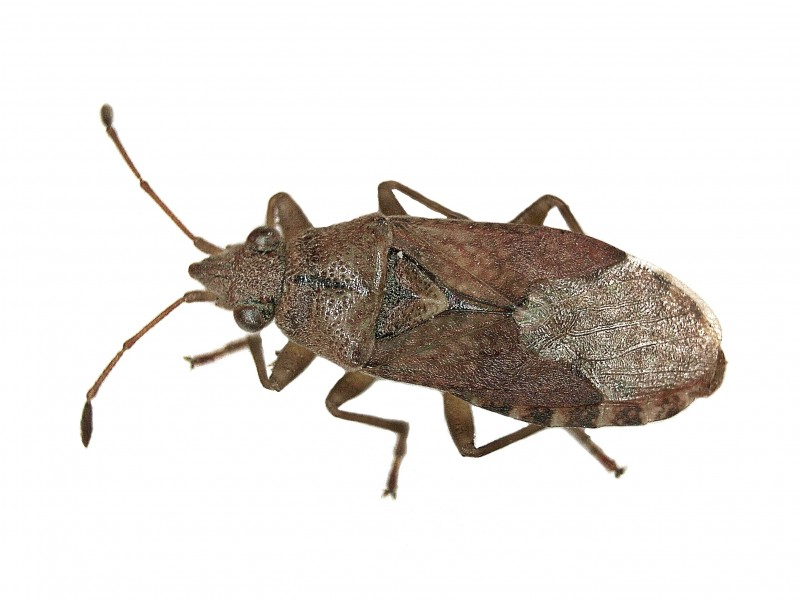
- Orsillus depressus (female)

Scientific classification
- Domain: Eukaryota
- Kingdom: Animalia
- Phylum: Arthropoda
- Class: Insecta
- Order: Hemiptera
- Suborder: Heteroptera
- Family: Lygaeidae
- Subfamily: Orsillinae
- Tribe: Orsillini

= Orsillini =

Tribe of true bugs

Orsillini is a tribe of seed bugs in the family Lygaeidae. The type genus is Orsillus.

== Genera ==
BioLib lists:

1. Aborsillus Barber, 1954
2. Austronysius Ashlock, 1967
3. Belonochilus Uhler, 1871
4. Camptocoris Puton, 1886
5. Eurynysius Ashlock, 1967
6. Neortholomus Hamilton, 1983
7. Orsillus Dallas, 1852
8. Ortholomus Stål, 1872
9. Sinorsillus Usinger, 1938
