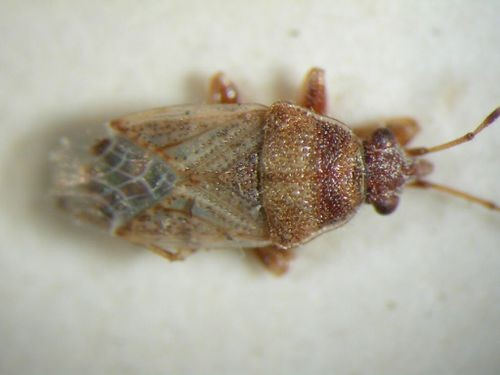

Scientific classification
- Domain: Eukaryota
- Kingdom: Animalia
- Phylum: Arthropoda
- Class: Insecta
- Order: Hemiptera
- Suborder: Heteroptera
- Family: Lygaeidae
- Genus: Crompus
- Species: C. opacus

Binomial name
- Crompus opacus Scudder, 1958

= Crompus opacus =

Species of true bug

Crompus opacus is a species of seed bug in the family Lygaeidae. It is a terrestrial insect found only in Australia. Crompus opacus is not currently listed under the Territory Parks and Wildlife Conservation Act 1976 in the Northern Territory of Australia.

== Description ==
Crompus opacus is recognizable by the white veins in the transparent surface of the forewing, and by the elongated head. While the first description of the species by Geoffery Scudder indicated that the first antenna segment is always black, the color can be black, light yellow-brown, and sometimes pale white like the second segment of the antenna. The pronotum occasionally has dark markings, including often a dark stripe down the center and a dark band at the base of the wings.

== Biology ==
This species breeds on various species of myrtles (Myrtaceae), including Taxandria linearifolia, Kunzea recurva, and species of Leptospermum. Crompus opacus is particularly common on the flowers of bush species between 2.5 and 3.5 meters tall growing in damp or moist areas along roads.
