= Oceanides =

Scientific classification
- Kingdom: Animalia
- Phylum: Arthropoda
- Clade: Pancrustacea
- Class: Insecta
- Order: Hemiptera
- Suborder: Heteroptera
- Family: Lygaeidae
- Subfamily: Orsillinae
- Tribe: Metrargini
- Genus: Oceanides; Kirkaldy, 1910

Genus of true bugs

External image
- Image at iNaturalist

Oceanides is a genus of Hawaiian seed bugs in the tribe Metrargini, erected by Kirkaldy in 1910.
