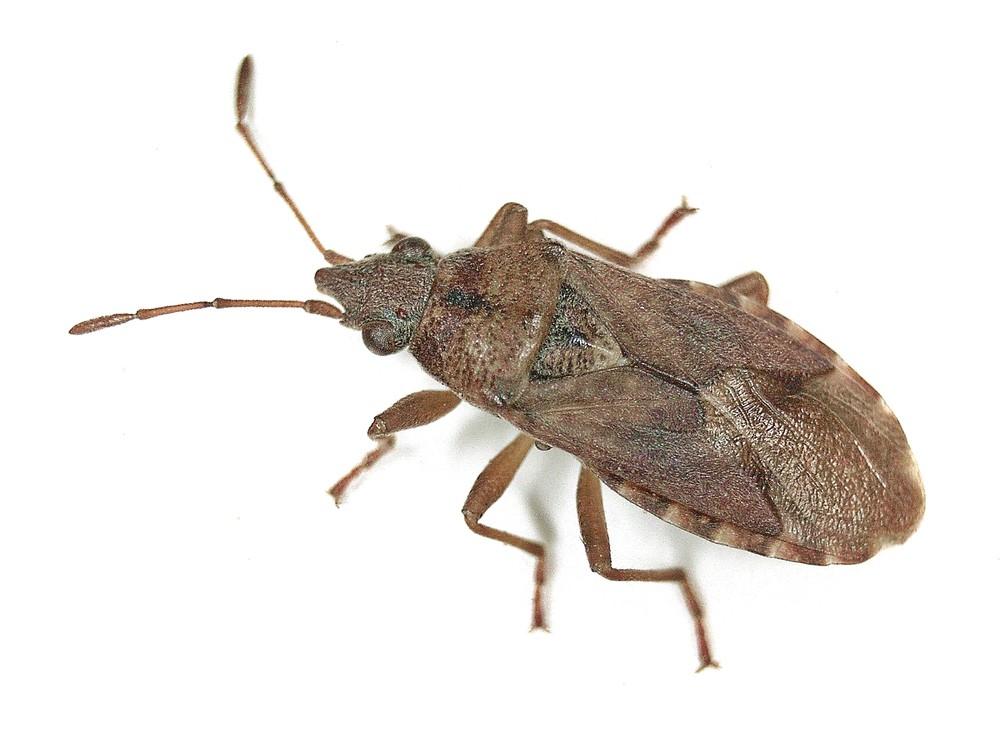

Scientific classification
- Kingdom: Animalia
- Phylum: Arthropoda
- Class: Insecta
- Order: Hemiptera
- Suborder: Heteroptera
- Family: Lygaeidae
- Genus: Orsillus
- Species: O. depressus

Binomial name
- Orsillus depressus (Mulsant & Rey, 1852)

Synonyms
- Heterogaster depressus Mulsant & Rey, 1852

= Orsillus depressus =

Species of true bug

Orsillus depressus is a species of seed bug in the family Lygaeidae. It is a terrestrial insect native to southern Europe. It is considered a naturalized introduced species in the UK. O. depressus was first recorded in England in the 1980s and is now common throughout central and southern England. In southern Europe, its host plants are trees in Cupressaceae while in the UK Lawson's cypress is the most common host plant. O. depressus is approximately 6 mm in length and has a browny-orange coloration. Like many other species in Lygaeidae, O. depressus is a phytophagous species, feeding on plants, and it is commonly found in woodland/forest habitats and in cultivated areas of gardens and parks.

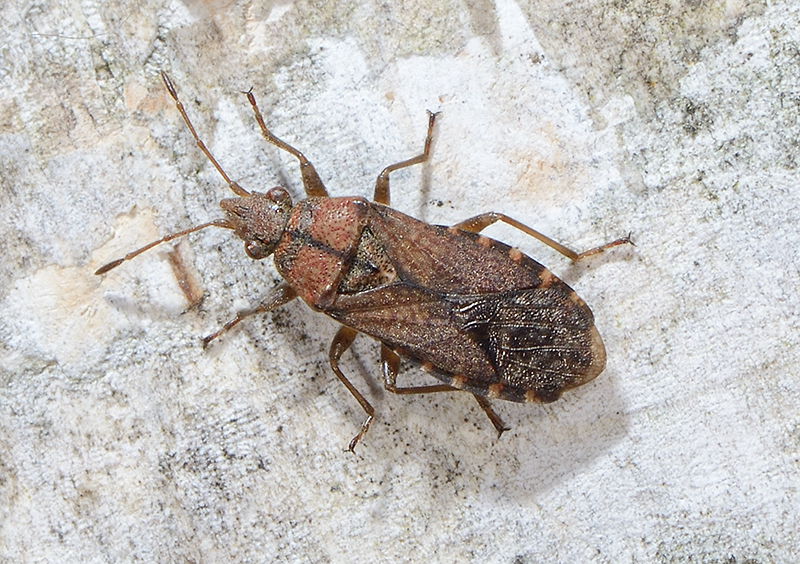
Orsillus depressus
