= Kleidocerys virescens =

Scientific classification
- Domain: Eukaryota
- Kingdom: Animalia
- Phylum: Arthropoda
- Class: Insecta
- Order: Hemiptera
- Suborder: Heteroptera
- Family: Lygaeidae
- Genus: Kleidocerys
- Species: K. virescens

Binomial name
- Kleidocerys virescens (Fabricius, 1794)

Species of true bug

Kleidocerys virescens is a species of seed bug in the family Lygaeidae. It is found in the Caribbean Sea, Central America, and North America.
