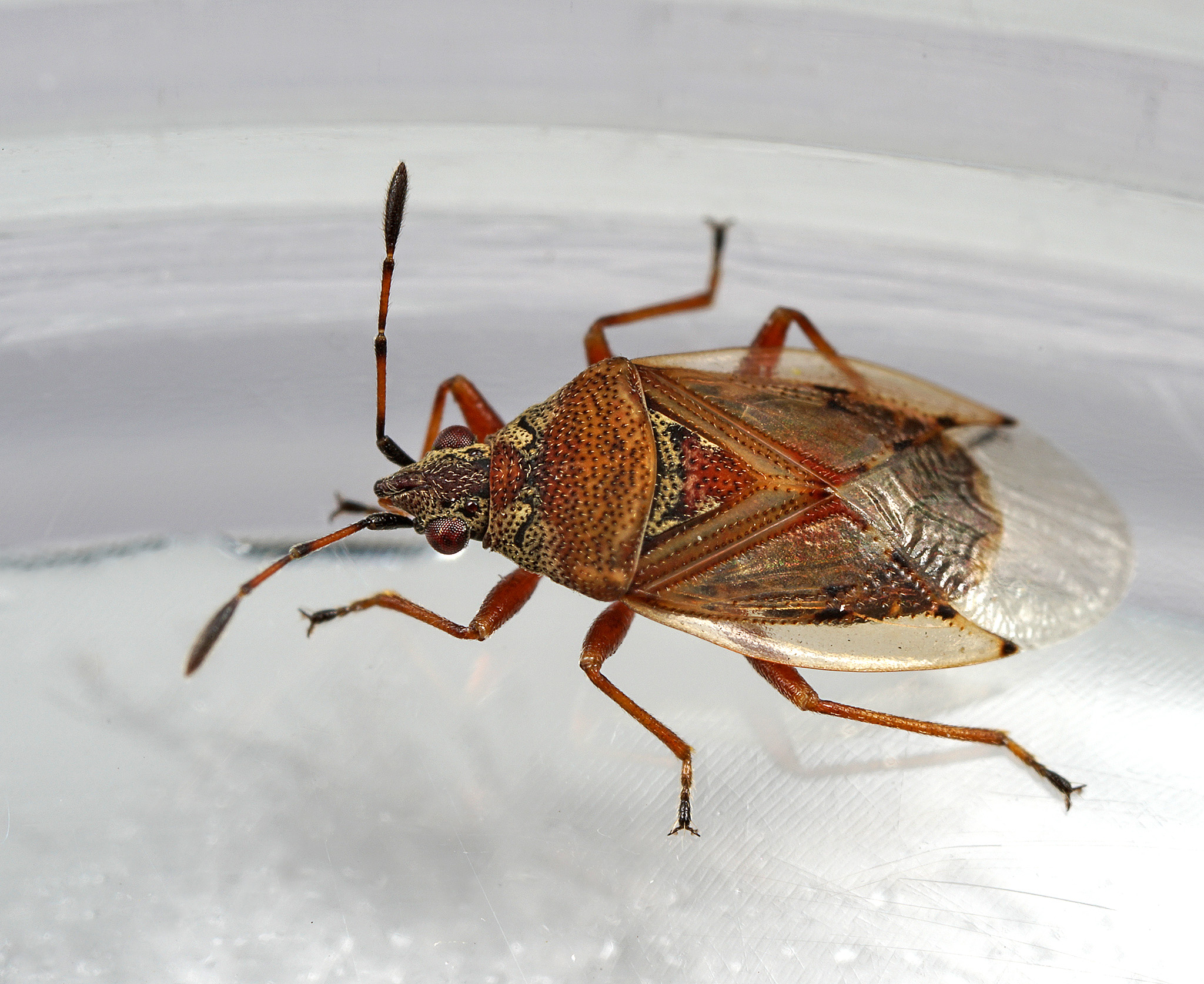

Scientific classification
- Domain: Eukaryota
- Kingdom: Animalia
- Phylum: Arthropoda
- Class: Insecta
- Order: Hemiptera
- Suborder: Heteroptera
- Family: Lygaeidae
- Genus: Kleidocerys
- Species: K. resedae

Binomial name
- Kleidocerys resedae (Panzer, 1797)

Synonyms
- Lygaeus resedae Panzer, 1797

= Kleidocerys resedae =

Species of true bug

Kleidocerys resedae, the birch catkin bug, is a species of seed bug in the family Lygaeidae. It is found in Europe and Northern Asia (excluding China) and North America.

== Subspecies ==
These four subspecies belong to the species Kleidocerys resedae:

- Kleidocerys resedae flavicornis (Duda, 1885)
- Kleidocerys resedae fuscomaculatus Barber, 1953
- Kleidocerys resedae geminatus (Say, 1831)
- Kleidocerys resedae resedae (Panzer, 1793)
