= Ochrimnus tripligatus =

Scientific classification
- Domain: Eukaryota
- Kingdom: Animalia
- Phylum: Arthropoda
- Class: Insecta
- Order: Hemiptera
- Suborder: Heteroptera
- Family: Lygaeidae
- Genus: Ochrimnus
- Species: O. tripligatus

Binomial name
- Ochrimnus tripligatus (Barber, 1914)

Species of true bug

Ochrimnus tripligatus is a species of seed bug in the family Lygaeidae. It is found in the Caribbean Sea and North America.
