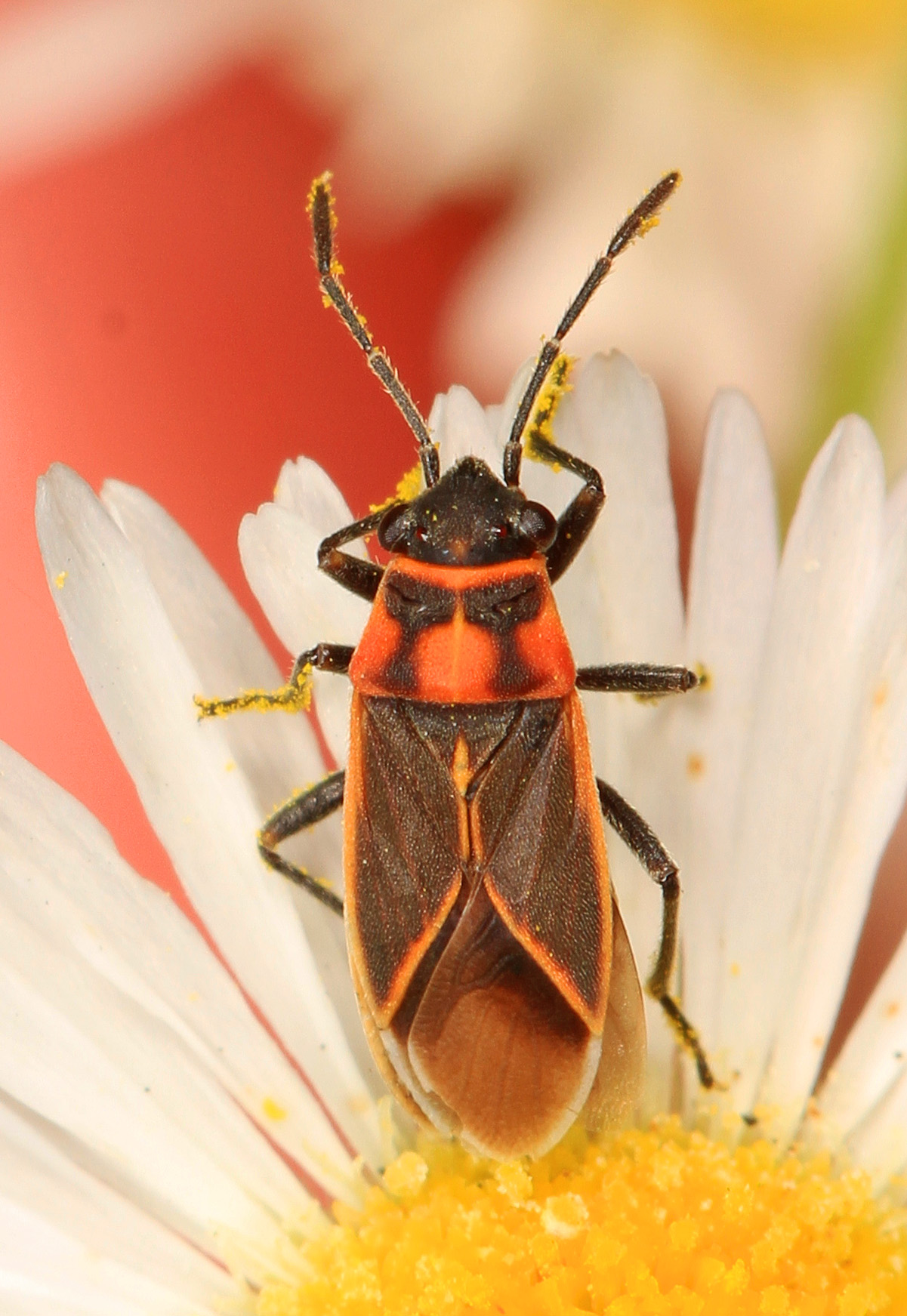

Scientific classification
- Domain: Eukaryota
- Kingdom: Animalia
- Phylum: Arthropoda
- Class: Insecta
- Order: Hemiptera
- Suborder: Heteroptera
- Family: Lygaeidae
- Genus: Ochrimnus
- Species: O. lineoloides

Binomial name
- Ochrimnus lineoloides (Slater, 1964)

= Ochrimnus lineoloides =

Species of true bug

Ochrimnus lineoloides is a species of seed bug in the family Lygaeidae. It is found in the Caribbean and North America.
