= Lygaeospilus tripunctatus =

Scientific classification
- Domain: Eukaryota
- Kingdom: Animalia
- Phylum: Arthropoda
- Class: Insecta
- Order: Hemiptera
- Suborder: Heteroptera
- Family: Lygaeidae
- Genus: Lygaeospilus
- Species: L. tripunctatus

Binomial name
- Lygaeospilus tripunctatus (Dallas, 1852)

Synonyms
- Aphanus tripunctatus Dallas, 1852

Species of true bug

Lygaeospilus tripunctatus is a species of seed bug in the family Lygaeidae. It is found in Central America and North America.
