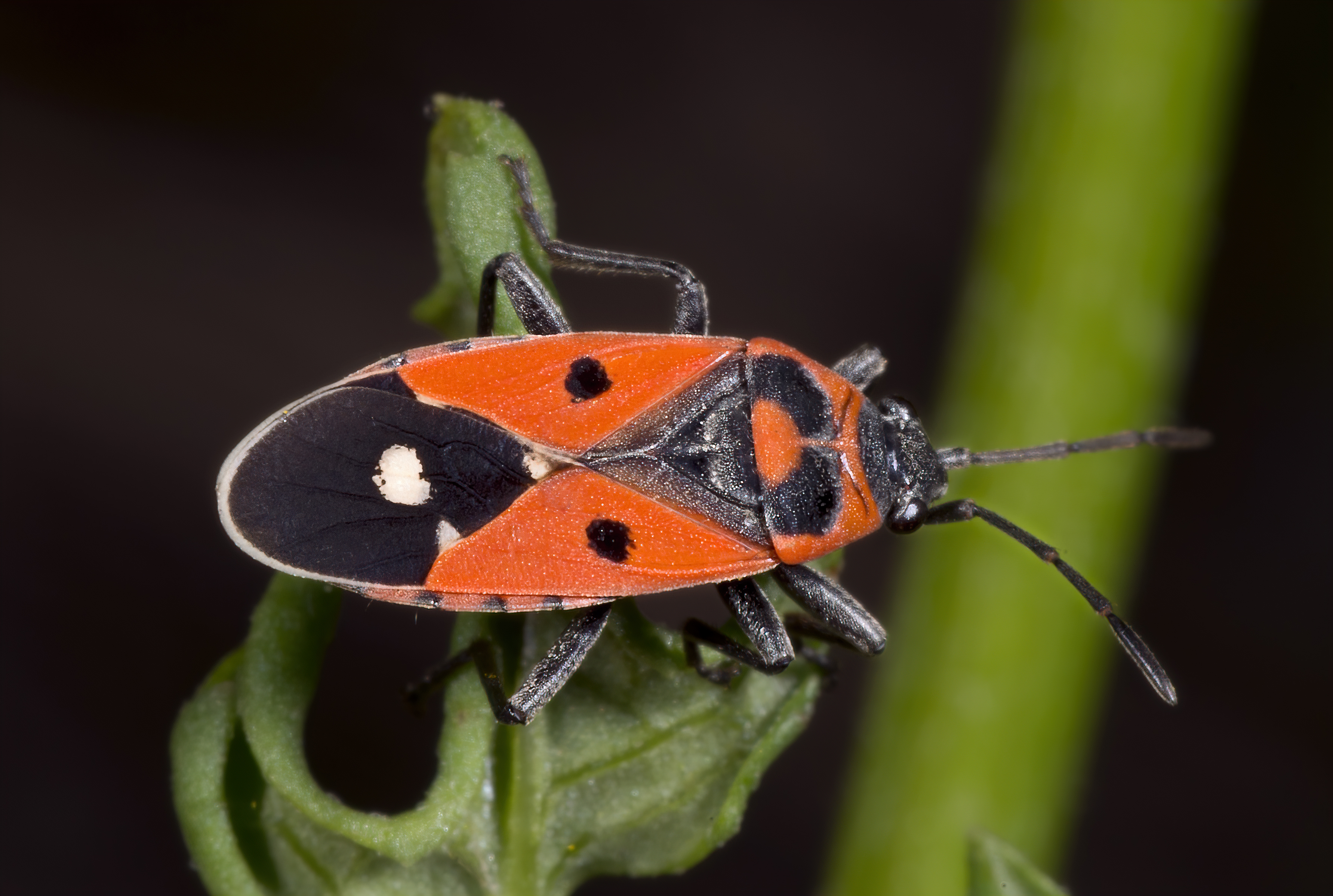
- Adult

Scientific classification
- Domain: Eukaryota
- Kingdom: Animalia
- Phylum: Arthropoda
- Class: Insecta
- Order: Hemiptera
- Suborder: Heteroptera
- Family: Lygaeidae
- Genus: Melanocoryphus
- Species: M. albomaculatus

Binomial name
- Melanocoryphus albomaculatus (Goeze, 1778)

= Melanocoryphus albomaculatus =

Species of true bug

Melanocoryphus albomaculatus is a species of insect in the sub-order of true bugs, Heteroptera.

== Characteristics ==
Melanocoryphus albomaculatus has a black head, scutellum, antennae and legs. On the red pronotum are two hook-shaped black spots. The corium of the hemelytra (the partially hardened front wings) is red with a black round spot in the middle, while the membrane (the transparent part of the front wings) is black and in the middle has a white round spot. The connexivum (on the visible side part of the abdomen) is red with black spots. The bug reaches a body size of 7–9 mm.

== Distribution and habitat ==
This heat-loving species is very common in the Mediterranean region. Its distribution area extends in the east via Asia Minor to the Caspian Sea. In Central Europe, the species occurs only sporadically and is usually limited to so-called "heat islands". In Germany, these are located in the Upper Rhine Plain and on the Middle Rhine. The species is also present on the northern French channel coast, in the Netherlands and in Austria.

== Lifestyle ==
The species prefers hot, dry, rocky habitats; more rarely areas with sandy soils. It is a so-called seed sucker. The main food plant of the species is the swallow-wort (Vincetoxicum hirundinaria). Other forage plants are the foxglove (Digitalis purpurea) and plants from the ragwort genus (Senecio). The adults of the species hibernate.

== Systematics ==
The species Melanocoryphus albomaculatus was described by the German zoologist Johann August Ephraim Goeze in 1778.

== Similar species ==
- Lygaeus equestris
- Lygaeus simulans
