= Kleidocerys ovalis =

Scientific classification
- Kingdom: Animalia
- Phylum: Arthropoda
- Clade: Pancrustacea
- Class: Insecta
- Order: Hemiptera
- Suborder: Heteroptera
- Family: Lygaeidae
- Genus: Kleidocerys
- Species: K. ovalis

Binomial name
- Kleidocerys ovalis Barber, 1953

Species of true bug

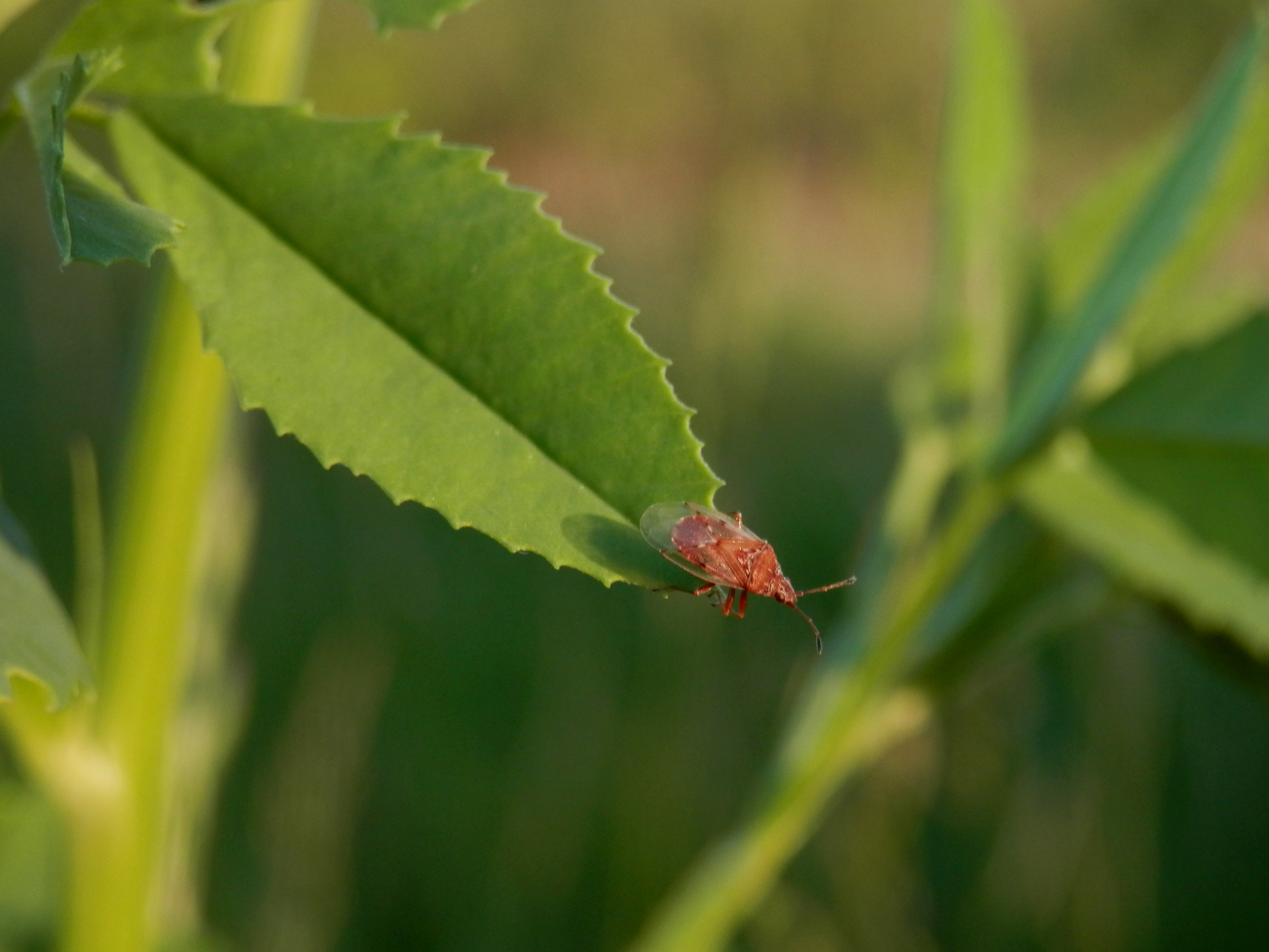
Kleidocerys ovalis in Guelph, Ontario, Canada

Kleidocerys ovalis is a species of seed bug in the family Lygaeidae. It is found in North America.
