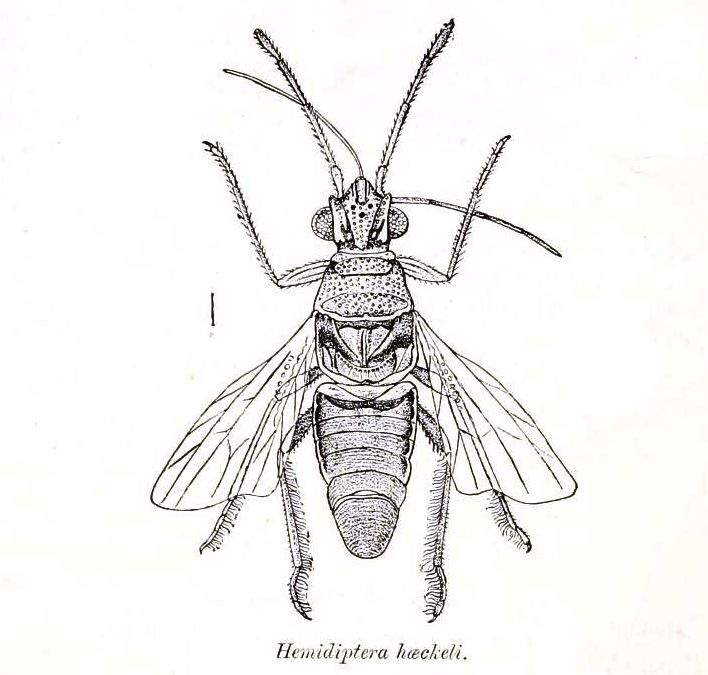
- Hemidiptera haeckeli

Scientific classification
- Kingdom: Animalia
- Phylum: Arthropoda
- Clade: Pancrustacea
- Class: Insecta
- Order: Hemiptera
- Suborder: Heteroptera
- Family: Lygaeidae
- Subfamily: Orsillinae; Stål, 1872

= Orsillinae =

Subfamily of true bugs

Orsillinae is a subfamily of seed bugs in the family Lygaeidae. There are at least 110 described species in Orsillinae; the type genus is Orsillus.

== Tribes and genera ==
The Lygaeoidea Species File includes four tribes:

=== Lepionysiini ===
1. Lepionysius Ashlock, 1967 - Australia

=== Metrargini ===
Neotropical and Pacific islands

1. Balionysius Ashlock, 1967
2. Coleonysius Ashlock, 1967
3. Cuyonysius Dellapé & Henry, 2020
4. Darwinysius Ashlock, 1967
5. Glyptonysius Usinger, 1942
6. Metrarga White, 1878
7. Neseis Kirkaldy, 1910
8. Nesoclimacias Kirkaldy, 1908
9. Nesocryptias Kirkaldy, 1908
10. Oceanides Kirkaldy, 1910
11. Robinsonocoris Kormilev, 1952
12. Xyonysius Ashlock & Lattin, 1963

=== Nysiini ===
1. Lepiorsillus Malipatil, 1979
2. Nesomartis Kirkaldy, 1907
3. Nithecus Horvath, 1890
4. Nysius Dallas, 1852 (false chinch bugs)
5. Oreonysius Usinger, 1952
6. Reticulatonysius Malipatil, 2005
7. Rhypodes Stal, 1868

=== Orsillini ===
1. Aborsillus Barber, 1954
2. Austronysius Ashlock, 1967
3. Belonochilus Uhler, 1871
4. Camptocoris Puton, 1886
5. Eurynysius Ashlock, 1967
6. Hyalonysius Slater, 1962
7. Neortholomus Hamilton, 1983
8. Orsillus Dallas, 1852
9. Ortholomus Stal, 1872
10. Sinorsillus Usinger, 1938
