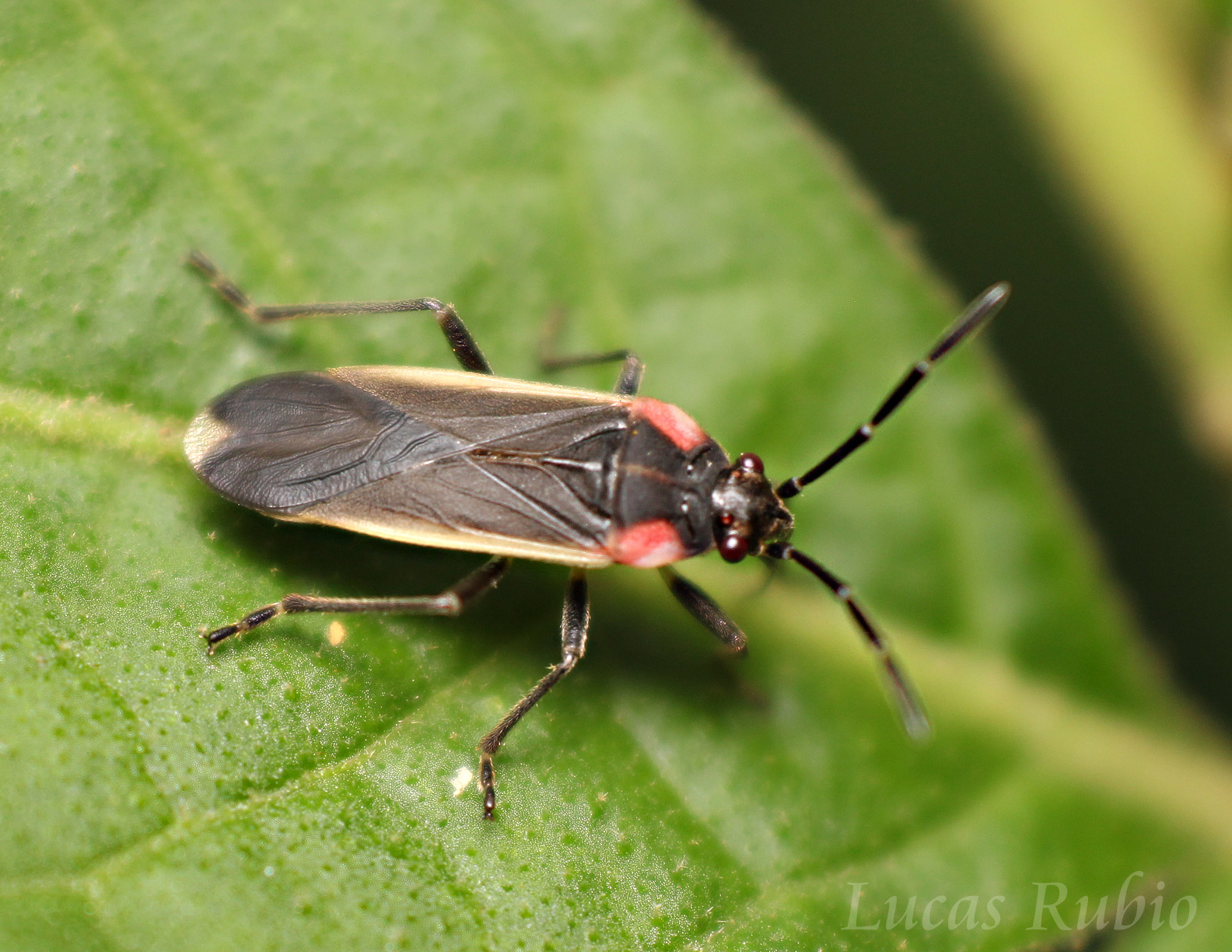
- Acroleucus coxalis, Brazil

Scientific classification
- Domain: Eukaryota
- Kingdom: Animalia
- Phylum: Arthropoda
- Class: Insecta
- Order: Hemiptera
- Suborder: Heteroptera
- Family: Lygaeidae
- Subfamily: Lygaeinae
- Genus: Acroleucus
- Species: A. coxalis

Binomial name
- Acroleucus coxalis (Stal, 1858)

= Acroleucus coxalis =

Species of seed bug

Acroleucus coxalis is a species of seed bug in the family Lygaeidae, found in South America.
