= Ochrimnus mimulus =

Scientific classification
- Kingdom: Animalia
- Phylum: Arthropoda
- Clade: Pancrustacea
- Class: Insecta
- Order: Hemiptera
- Suborder: Heteroptera
- Family: Lygaeidae
- Genus: Ochrimnus
- Species: O. mimulus

Binomial name
- Ochrimnus mimulus (Stal, 1874)

Species of true bug

Ochrimnus mimulus, Volusia County, FL, USA

Ochrimnus mimulus is a species of seed bug in the family Lygaeidae. It is found in North America.
