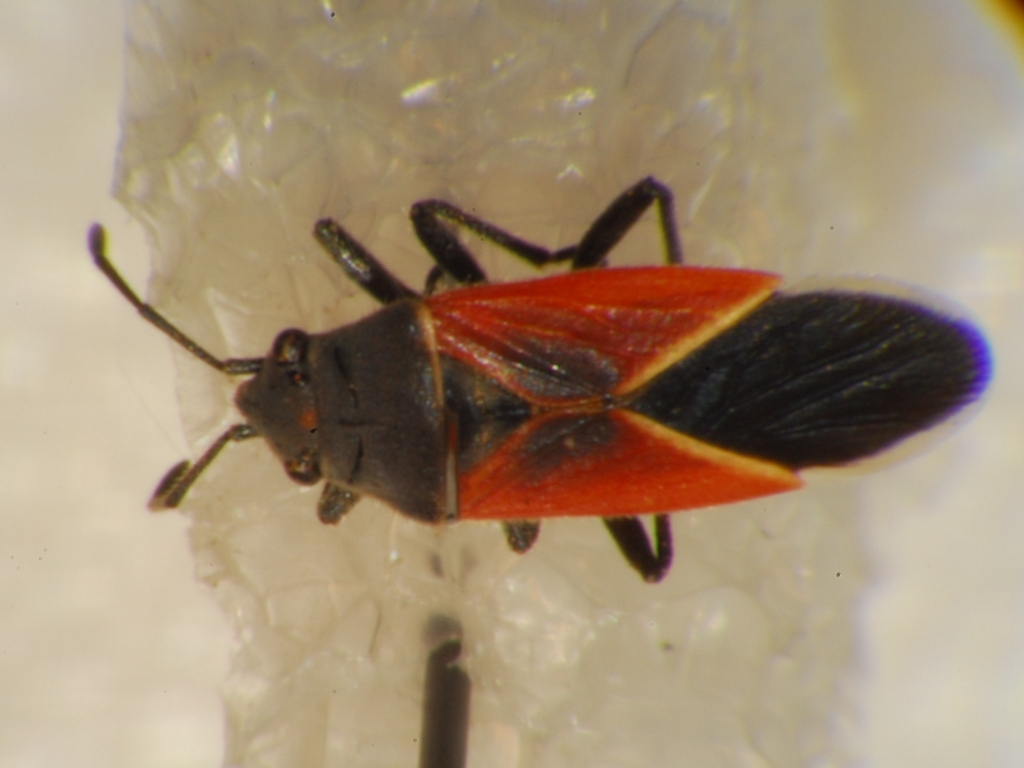

Scientific classification
- Domain: Eukaryota
- Kingdom: Animalia
- Phylum: Arthropoda
- Class: Insecta
- Order: Hemiptera
- Suborder: Heteroptera
- Family: Lygaeidae
- Genus: Melanopleurus
- Species: M. pyrrhopterus

Binomial name
- Melanopleurus pyrrhopterus (Stal, 1874)

= Melanopleurus pyrrhopterus =

Species of true bug

Melanopleurus pyrrhopterus is a species of seed bug in the family Lygaeidae. It is found in the continental United States, Mexico, and has also been recorded in Canada.

== Subspecies ==
There are two recognized subspecies of Melanopleurus pyrrhopterus:

- Melanopleurus pyrrhopterus melanopleurus (Uhler, 1893)
- Melanopleurus pyrrhopterus pyrrhopterus (Stål, 1874)
