= Kleidocerys modestus =

Scientific classification
- Domain: Eukaryota
- Kingdom: Animalia
- Phylum: Arthropoda
- Class: Insecta
- Order: Hemiptera
- Suborder: Heteroptera
- Family: Lygaeidae
- Genus: Kleidocerys
- Species: K. modestus

Binomial name
- Kleidocerys modestus Barber, 1953

Species of true bug

Kleidocerys modestus is a species of seed bug in the family Lygaeidae. It is found in North America.
