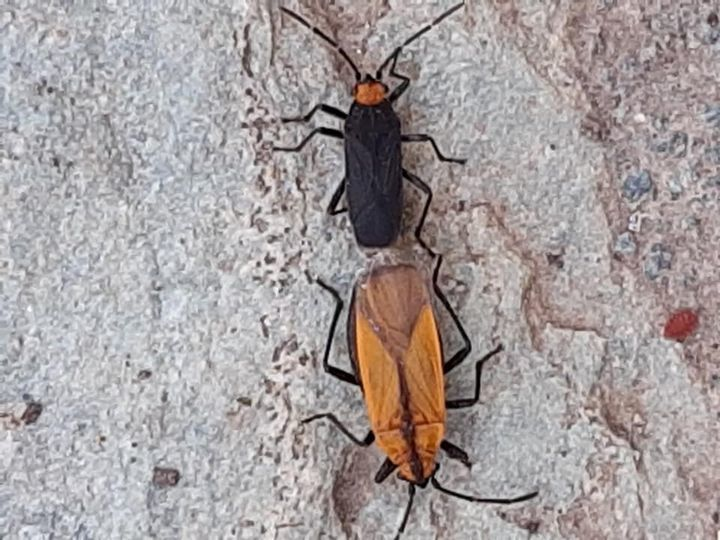

Scientific classification
- Domain: Eukaryota
- Kingdom: Animalia
- Phylum: Arthropoda
- Class: Insecta
- Order: Hemiptera
- Suborder: Heteroptera
- Family: Lygaeidae
- Genus: Acroleucus
- Species: A. marinoi

Binomial name
- Acroleucus marinoi Brailovsky, 1980

= Acroleucus marinoi =

Species of insect

Acroleucus marinoi is a species from the genus Acroleucus.
