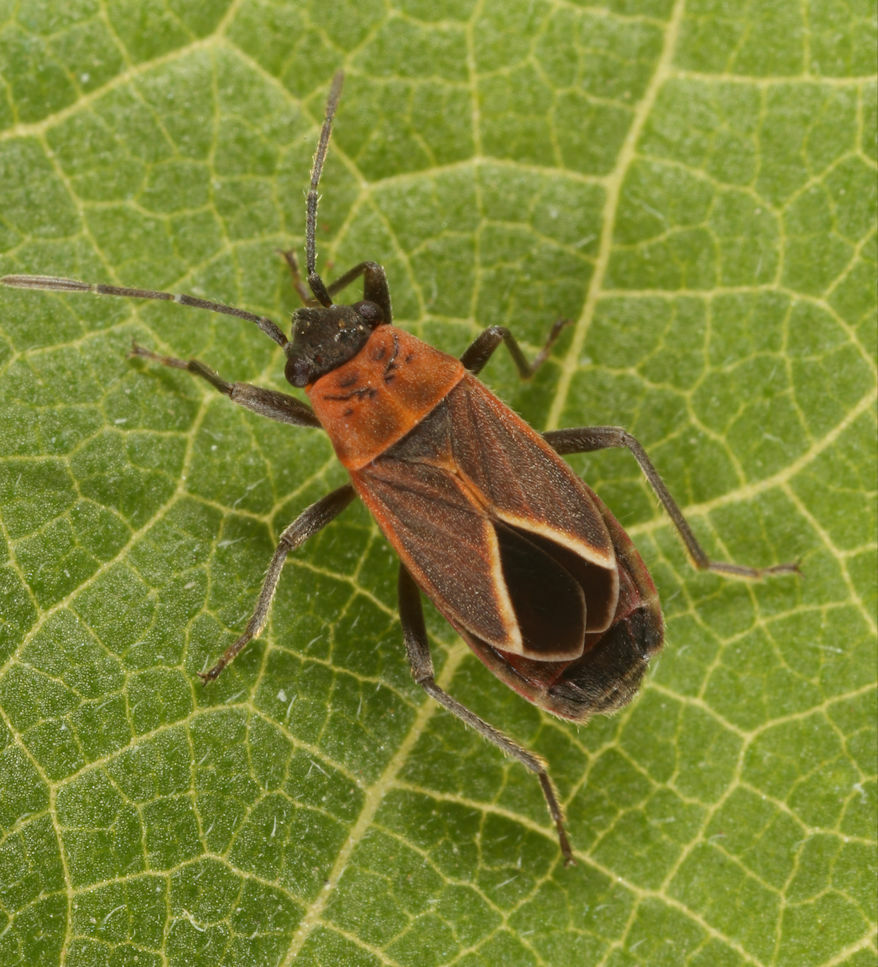

Scientific classification
- Domain: Eukaryota
- Kingdom: Animalia
- Phylum: Arthropoda
- Class: Insecta
- Order: Hemiptera
- Suborder: Heteroptera
- Family: Lygaeidae
- Genus: Ochrimnus
- Species: O. barberi

Binomial name
- Ochrimnus barberi (Slater, 1964)

= Ochrimnus barberi =

Species of true bug

Ochrimnus barberi is a species of seed bug in the family Lygaeidae. It is found in Central America and North America.
