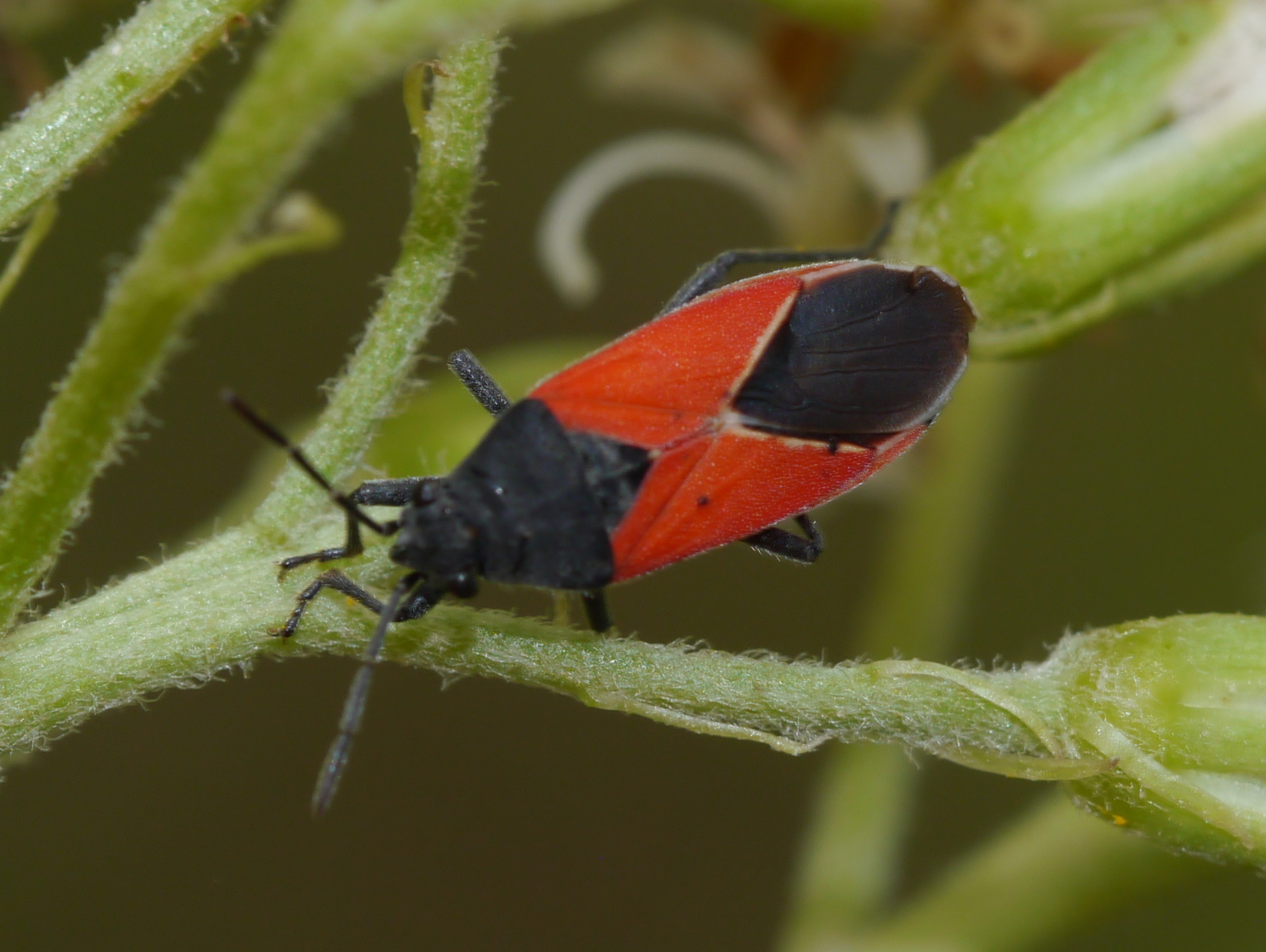

Scientific classification
- Domain: Eukaryota
- Kingdom: Animalia
- Phylum: Arthropoda
- Class: Insecta
- Order: Hemiptera
- Suborder: Heteroptera
- Family: Lygaeidae
- Genus: Melanopleurus
- Species: M. belfragei

Binomial name
- Melanopleurus belfragei (Stal, 1874)

= Melanopleurus belfragei =

Species of true bug

Melanopleurus belfragei, the redcoat seed bug, is a species of seed bug in the family Lygaeidae. It is found in Central America and North America.
