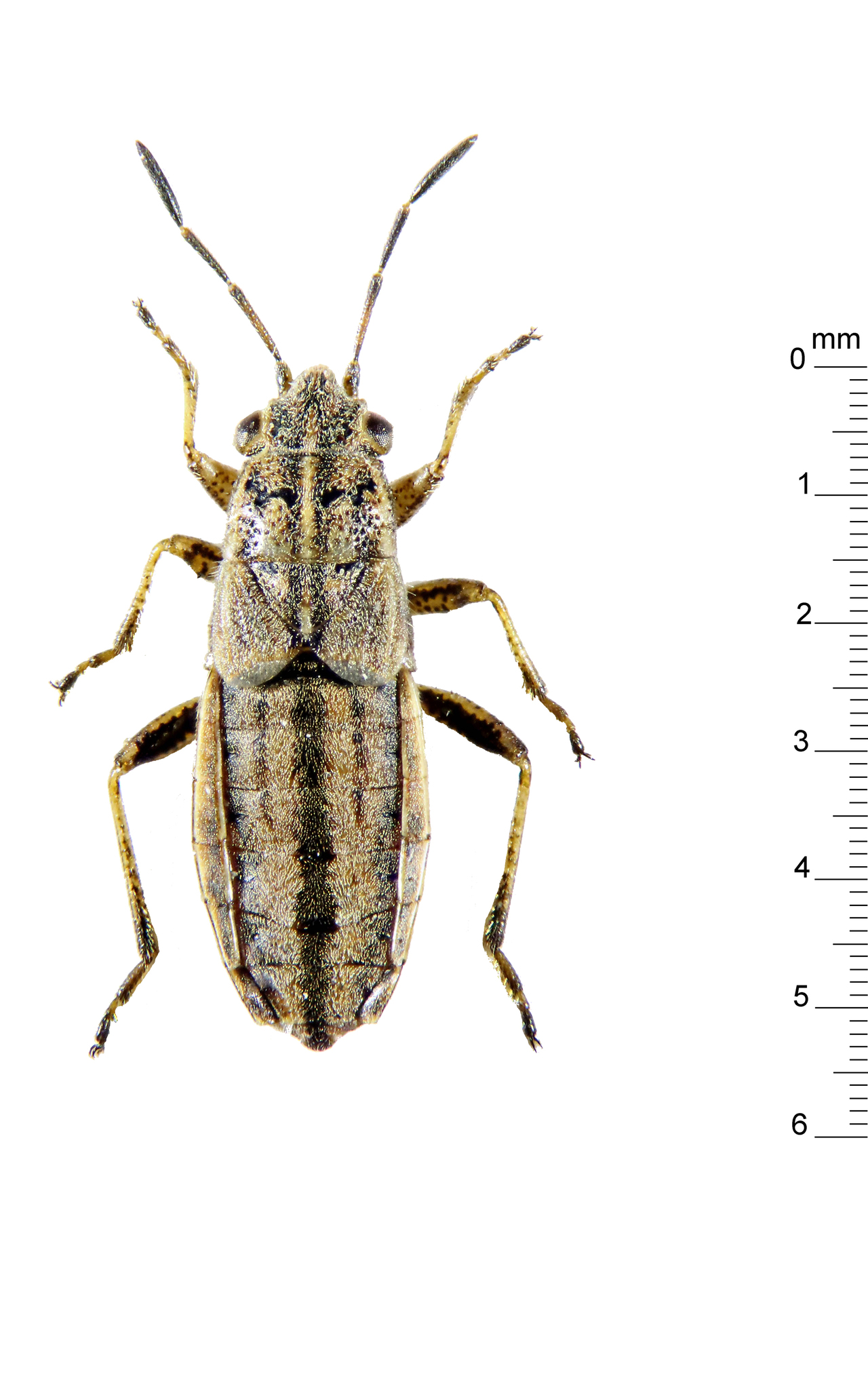

Scientific classification
- Kingdom: Animalia
- Phylum: Arthropoda
- Class: Insecta
- Order: Hemiptera
- Suborder: Heteroptera
- Family: Lygaeidae
- Genus: Rhypodes
- Species: R. anceps

Binomial name
- Rhypodes anceps ( White, 1878)

Synonyms
- Nysius anceps White, 1878; Hudsona anceps (White, 1878)

= Rhypodes anceps =

Species of bug

Rhypodes anceps, sometimes known Hudson's bug, is a species of seed bug in the family Lygaeidae endemic to New Zealand.

== Description ==
Hudsons bug is found in the South Island. Its diet is primarily composed of grasses such as silver tussock and tall hawkweed.
