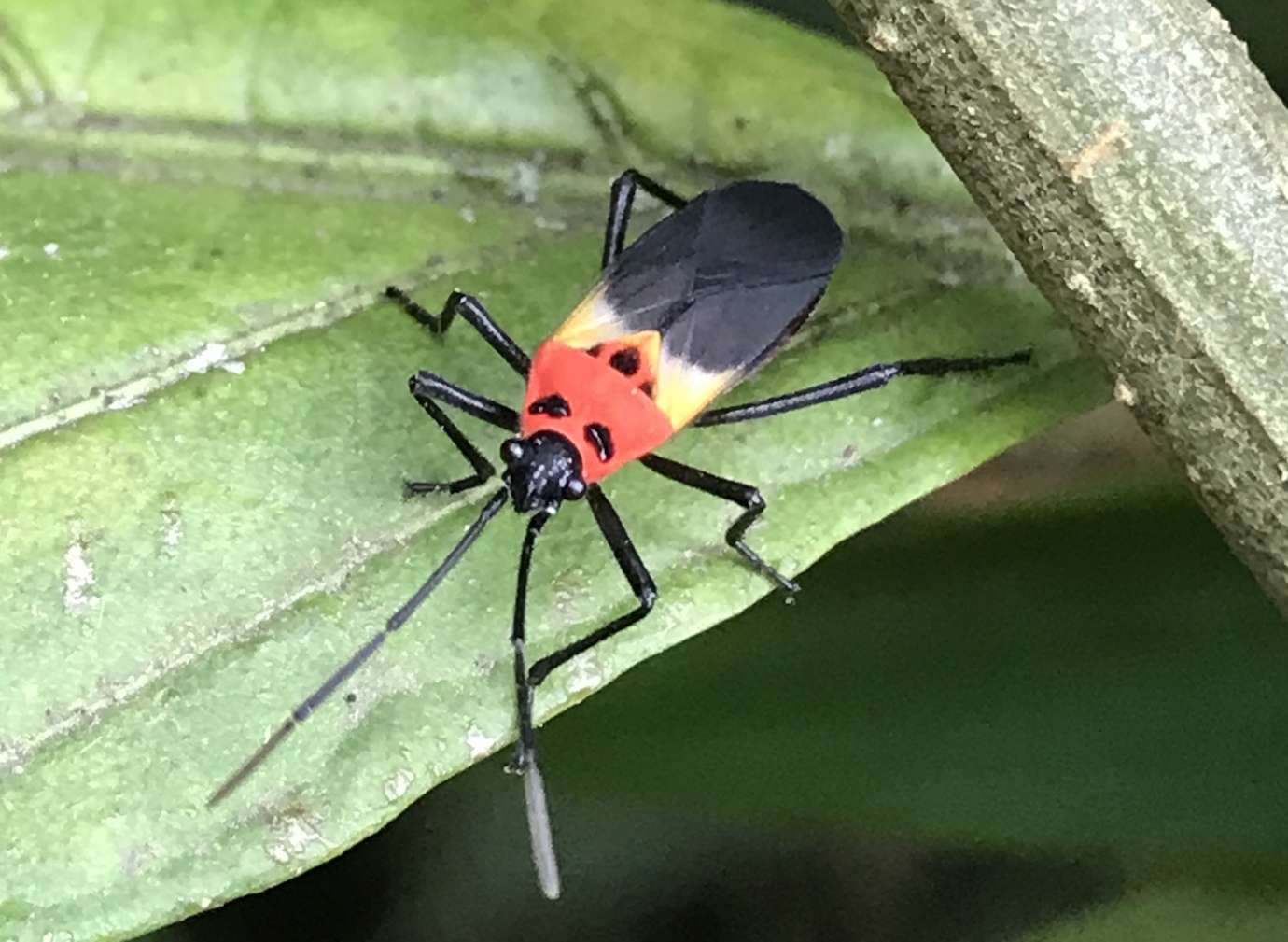
- Acroleucus nobilis

Scientific classification
- Kingdom: Animalia
- Phylum: Arthropoda
- Clade: Pancrustacea
- Class: Insecta
- Order: Hemiptera
- Suborder: Heteroptera
- Family: Lygaeidae
- Subfamily: Lygaeinae
- Genus: Acroleucus; Stål, 1874

Species
- See text

= Acroleucus =

Genus of insect

Acroleucus is a genus of seed bug in the family Lygaeidae. As of 2024, it contains 44 species:

- Acroleucus argutus Brailovsky, 1980
- Acroleucus bordoni Brailovsky, 1984
- Acroleucus brevicollis (Stål, 1862)
- Acroleucus bromelicola Brailovsky, 1977
- Acroleucus caiaraensis Brailovsky, 1984
- Acroleucus calvatus Brailovsky & Cervantes, 2008
- Acroleucus colombianus Brailovsky & Barrera, 2015
- Acroleucus conchatus Brailovsky, 1984
- Acroleucus coxalis (Stål, 1858)
- Acroleucus daedalus Brailovsky, 1980
- Acroleucus delineatus Distant, 1893
- Acroleucus devius Brailovsky, 1980
- Acroleucus diaphanus Brailovsky, 1984
- Acroleucus dollingi Brailovsky, 1980
- Acroleucus flavoseptus Stål, 1874
- Acroleucus gollnerae Brailovsky, 1980
- Acroleucus haemopterus Stål, 1874
- Acroleucus herbosus Brailovsky, 1984
- Acroleucus heros Breddin, 1904
- Acroleucus hoberlandti Brailovsky, 1980
- Acroleucus inimicus Brailovsky, 1980
- Acroleucus lamothei Brailovsky, 1980
- Acroleucus lojus Brailovsky & Barrera, 2015
- Acroleucus marinoi Brailovsky, 1980
- Acroleucus municeps Brailovsky & Barrera, 1984
- Acroleucus neomaurus Slater, 1964
- Acroleucus nexus Brailovsky & Barrera, 1984
- Acroleucus nigellus Distant, 1893
- Acroleucus nigrovittatus Stål, 1874
- Acroleucus nobilis Stål, 1874
- Acroleucus orinocoensis Brailovsky, 1984
- Acroleucus phoenix Brailovsky, 1980
- Acroleucus pothus Breddin, 1904
- Acroleucus rubefactus Distant, 1893
- Acroleucus scitulus Brailovsky & Barrera, 1984
- Acroleucus signaticollis Stål, 1874
- Acroleucus signoretii Stål, 1874
- Acroleucus stali Slater, 1964
- Acroleucus subniger Distant, 1882
- Acroleucus tensus Brailovsky & Cervantes, 2008
- Acroleucus tullus (Stål, 1862)
- Acroleucus vittaticeps Stål, 1874
- Acroleucus vulturnus Brailovsky, 1984
- Acroleucus yacambuensis Brailovsky, 1984
