= Darwinysius =

Scientific classification
- Domain: Eukaryota
- Kingdom: Animalia
- Phylum: Arthropoda
- Class: Insecta
- Order: Hemiptera
- Suborder: Heteroptera
- Family: Lygaeidae
- Tribe: Metrargini
- Genus: Darwinysius; Ashlock, 1967

Genus of insects

Darwinysius is a genus of true bugs belonging to the tribe Metrargini, endemic to the Galápagos Islands.

== Species ==
GBIF includes:

- Darwinysius marginalis (W.S.Dallas, 1852)
- Darwinysius wenmanensis P.D.Ashlock, 1972
