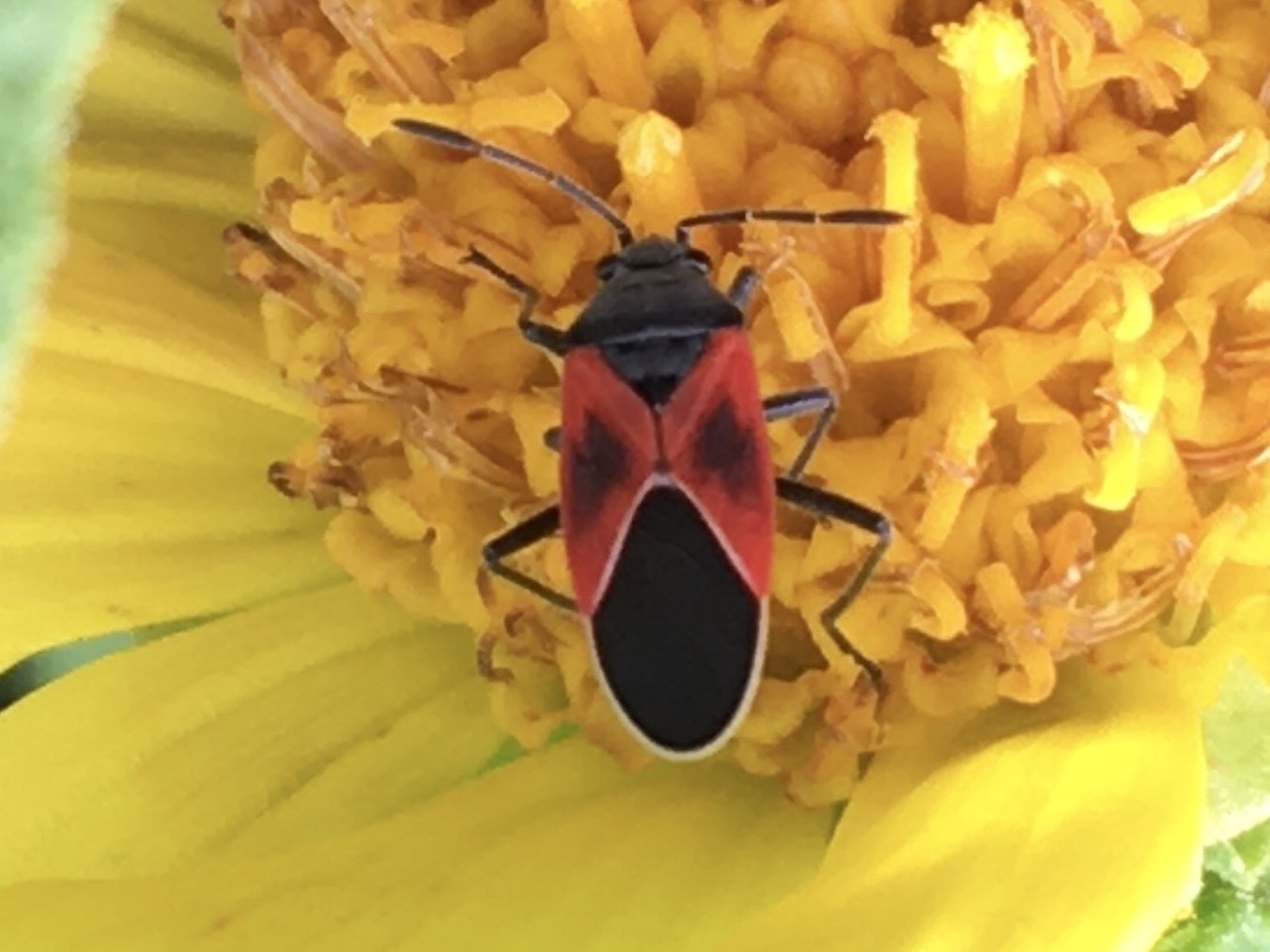
- Melanopleurus fuscosus

Scientific classification
- Domain: Eukaryota
- Kingdom: Animalia
- Phylum: Arthropoda
- Class: Insecta
- Order: Hemiptera
- Suborder: Heteroptera
- Family: Lygaeidae
- Subfamily: Lygaeinae
- Genus: Melanopleurus; Stal, 1874

= Melanopleurus =

Genus of true bugs

Melanopleurus (meaning "black side") is a genus of seed bugs in the family Lygaeidae. There are more than 20 described species in the genus Melanopleurus.

== Species ==
These 21 species belong to the genus Melanopleurus:

- Melanopleurus amnigena (Brailovsky & Barrera, 1984)
- Melanopleurus aureus (Distant, 1893)
- Melanopleurus barrerai Brailovsky, 1979
- Melanopleurus belfragei (Stal, 1874) (redcoat seed bug)
- Melanopleurus bicolor (Herrich-Schaeffer, 1850)
- Melanopleurus bistriangularis (Say, 1831)
- Melanopleurus brevis Brailovsky, 1975
- Melanopleurus complicatus Brailovsky, 1975
- Melanopleurus dearmasi (Alayo, 1973)
- Melanopleurus fuscosus Brailovsky, 1977
- Melanopleurus inflatus Brailovsky, 1979
- Melanopleurus maculicorium Maldonado-Capriles, 1974
- Melanopleurus matucanae (Brailovsky, 1978)
- Melanopleurus nubilus Brailovsky, 1979
- Melanopleurus perplexus Scudder, 1981
- Melanopleurus pyrrhopterus (Stal, 1874)
- Melanopleurus tenor Brailovsky, 1979
- Melanopleurus tetraspilus Stal, 1874
- Melanopleurus vazquezae Brailovsky, 1979
- Melanopleurus villai Brailovsky, 1979
- Melanopleurus wygodzinskyi (Alayo, 1973)
