= Lygaenocorinae =

Lygaenocorinae Temporal range: Callovian–Oxfordian

Scientific classification
- Domain: Eukaryota
- Kingdom: Animalia
- Phylum: Arthropoda
- Class: Insecta
- Order: Hemiptera
- Suborder: Heteroptera
- Family: Lygaeidae
- Subfamily: †Lygaenocorinae

Extinct subfamily of true bugs

Lygaenocorinae is an extinct subfamily of seed bugs in the family Lygaeidae. There are at least three genera in Lygaenocorinae.

== Genera ==
These three genera belong to the subfamily Lygaenocorinae:

- † Lygaenocoris Popov, 1961
- † Oligacanthus Hong, 1980
- † Sinolygaeus Hong, 1980
