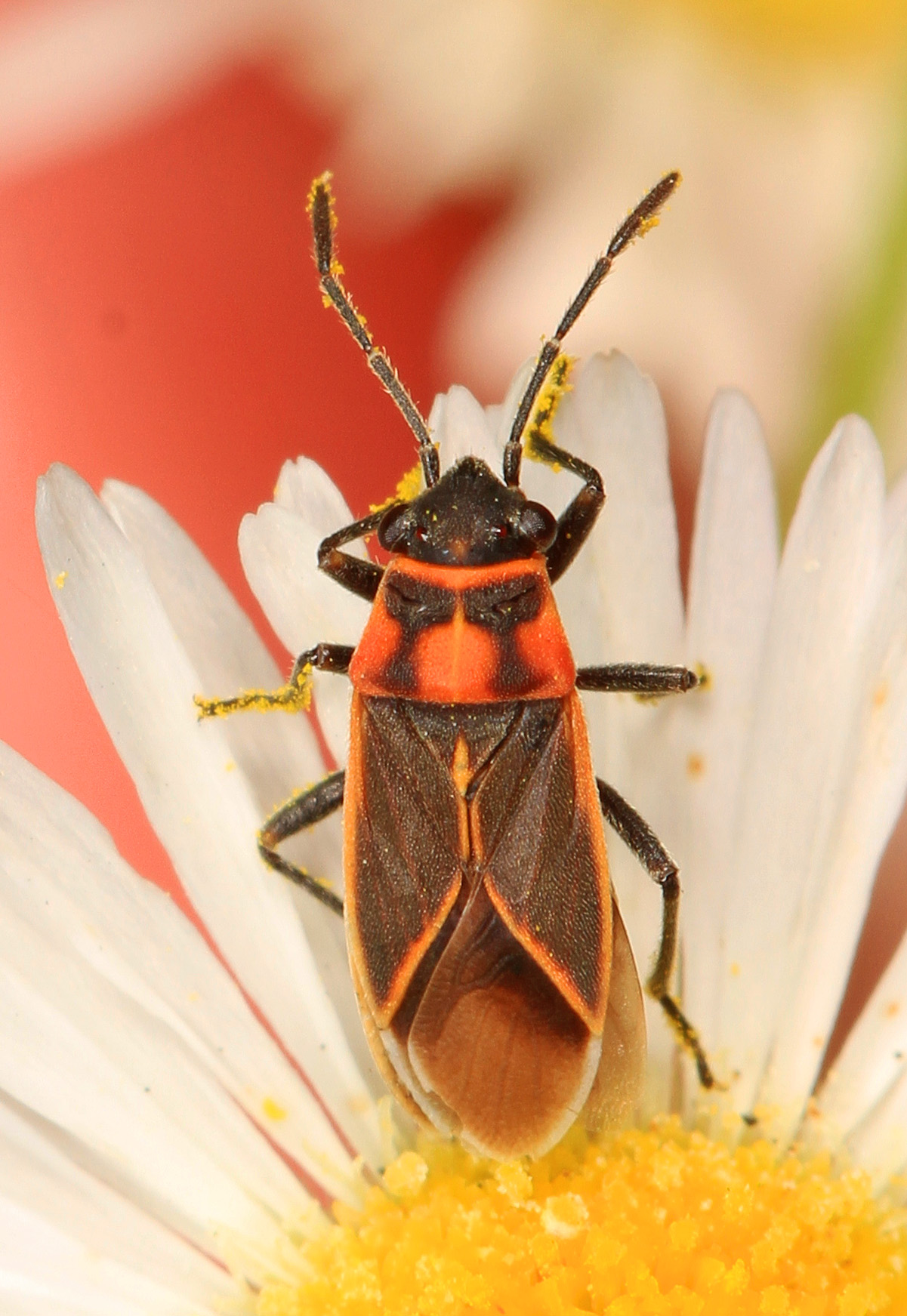
- Ochrimnus lineoloides

Scientific classification
- Domain: Eukaryota
- Kingdom: Animalia
- Phylum: Arthropoda
- Class: Insecta
- Order: Hemiptera
- Suborder: Heteroptera
- Family: Lygaeidae
- Subfamily: Lygaeinae
- Genus: Ochrimnus; Stal, 1874

Subgenera
- Aglaochrimnus Slater Alex, 1992 Ochrimnus Stal, 1874 Orthochrimnus Slater Alex, 1992 Parochrimnus Slater Alex, 1992 Phaeochrimnus Slater Alex, 1992

= Ochrimnus =

Genus of true bugs

Ochrimnus is a genus of seed bugs in the family Lygaeidae. There are more than 40 described species in Ochrimnus.

== Species ==
These species belong to the genus Ochrimnus:

Ochrimnus barberi (Slater, 1964)
Ochrimnus bellissimus Brailovsky, 1982
Ochrimnus bracensis Baranowski & Slater, 1998
Ochrimnus carnosulus (Van Duzee, 1914)
Ochrimnus cellus Brailovsky, 1982
Ochrimnus chontalensis (Distant, 1893)
Ochrimnus cinctipennis (Stal, 1858)
Ochrimnus collaris (Fabricius, 1803)
Ochrimnus conjunctus (Distant, 1882)
Ochrimnus consanguinitas (Distant, 1882)
Ochrimnus cophinus Brailovsky, 1982
Ochrimnus dallasi (Guerin-Meneville, 1857)
Ochrimnus dimorphopterus Brailovsky, 1982
Ochrimnus disseptus (Stal, 1874)
Ochrimnus foederatus (Van Duzee, 1929)
Ochrimnus gerulus Brailovsky, 1982
Ochrimnus henryi Brailovsky, 1982
Ochrimnus interstinctus (Distant, 1882)
Ochrimnus laevus Brailovsky, 1982
Ochrimnus languidus Brailovsky, 1982
Ochrimnus limbatipennis (Stal, 1858)
Ochrimnus lineoloides (Slater, 1964)
Ochrimnus luteolus Brailovsky, 1982
Ochrimnus lynceus Brailovsky, 1982
Ochrimnus marginatus Baranowski, 2005
Ochrimnus marquezi Brailovsky, 1982
Ochrimnus mimulus (Stal, 1874)
Ochrimnus mirum Brailovsky, 1982
Ochrimnus naevillus Brailovsky, 2021
Ochrimnus neotropicalis (Kirkaldy, 1909)
Ochrimnus nigriceps (Scudder, 1958)
Ochrimnus nigrosteolaris Brailovsky, 2021
Ochrimnus nitidulus Brailovsky, 1982
Ochrimnus obsoletus (Stal, 1858)
Ochrimnus pallescens (Stal, 1862)
Ochrimnus pallidocinctus (Stal, 1862)
Ochrimnus pseudocollaris Brailovsky, 1982
Ochrimnus rabidus Brailovsky, 1982
Ochrimnus rostratum Brailovsky, 2021
Ochrimnus sagax Brailovsky, 1982
Ochrimnus scalprum Brailovsky, 1982
Ochrimnus sceptrum Brailovsky, 1982
Ochrimnus schizus Brailovsky, 1982
Ochrimnus somnus Brailovsky, 1982
Ochrimnus succineus Brailovsky, 1982
Ochrimnus testatus Brailovsky, 1982
Ochrimnus tripligatus (Barber, 1914)
