= Lygaeospilus =

Scientific classification
- Domain: Eukaryota
- Kingdom: Animalia
- Phylum: Arthropoda
- Class: Insecta
- Order: Hemiptera
- Suborder: Heteroptera
- Family: Lygaeidae
- Subfamily: Lygaeinae
- Genus: Lygaeospilus; Barber, 1921

Genus of true bugs

Lygaeospilus is a genus of seed bugs in the family Lygaeidae. There are at least four described species in Lygaeospilus.

== Species ==
These four species belong to the genus Lygaeospilus:

- Lygaeospilus brevipilus Scudder, 1981
- Lygaeospilus fusconervosus Barber, 1948
- Lygaeospilus pusio (Stal, 1874)
- Lygaeospilus tripunctatus (Dallas, 1852)
