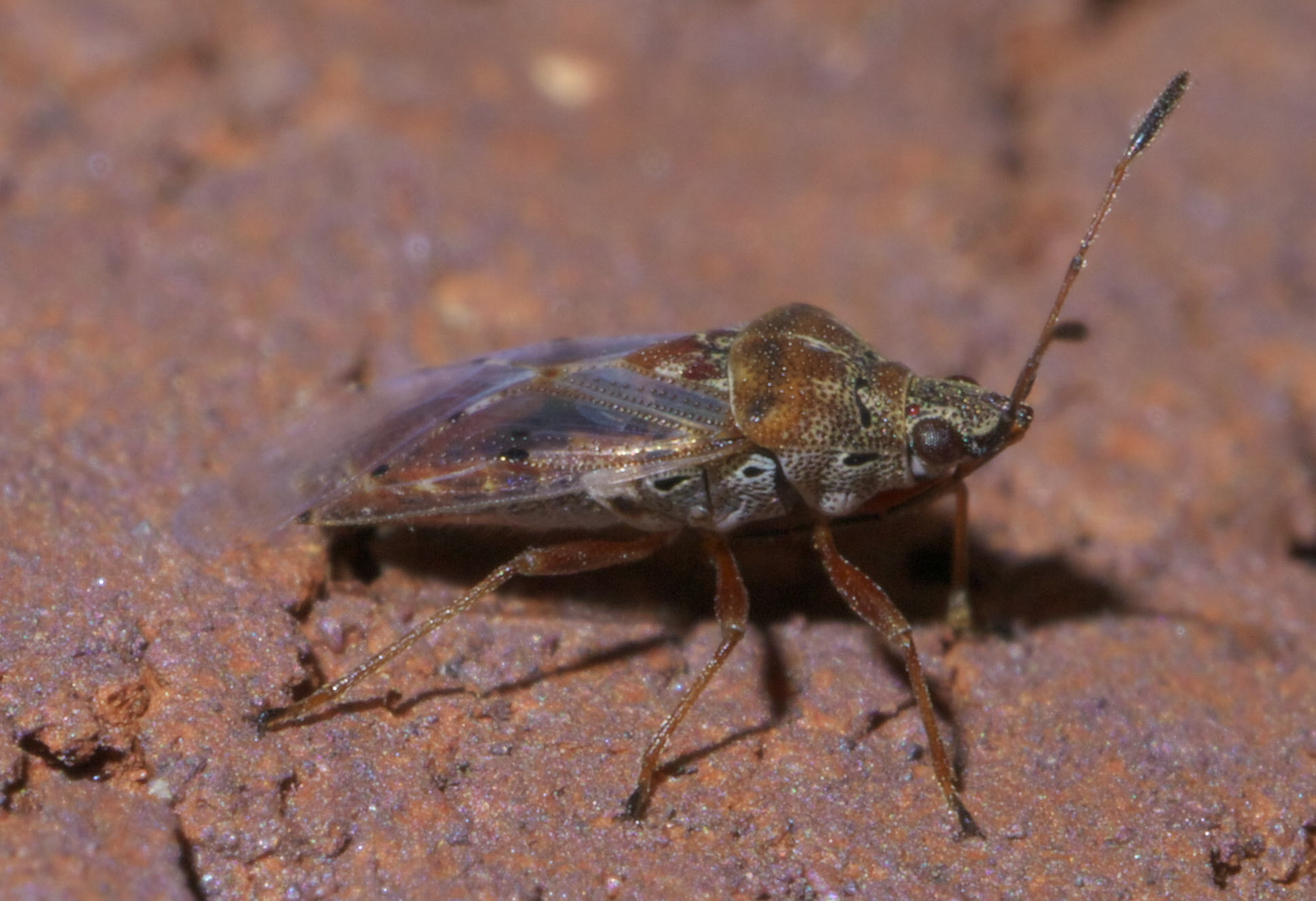
- Kleidocerys resedae

Scientific classification
- Kingdom: Animalia
- Phylum: Arthropoda
- Clade: Pancrustacea
- Class: Insecta
- Order: Hemiptera
- Suborder: Heteroptera
- Family: Lygaeidae
- Subfamily: Ischnorhynchinae

= Ischnorhynchinae =

Subfamily of true bugs

Ischnorhynchinae is a subfamily of seed bugs in the family Lygaeidae. There are about 16 genera and more than 70 described species in Ischnorhynchinae. The members of this subfamily are small, terrestrial insects that typically translucent or transparent plate-like structures covering the thorax (pronota) and tend to live in plant flowers.

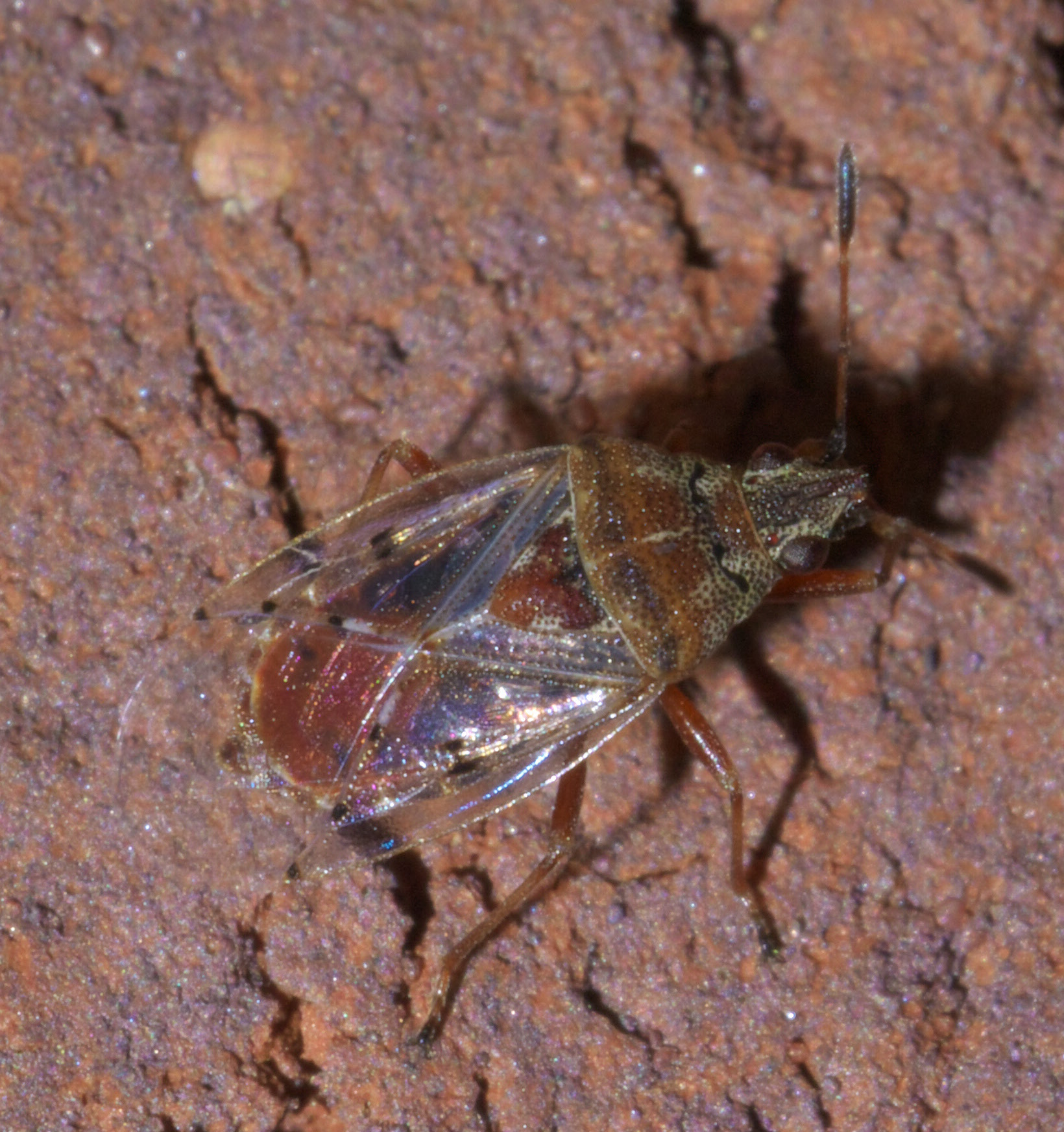
Kleidocerys resedae

== Genera ==
These 16 genera belong to the subfamily Ischnorhynchinae:

- Acanthocrompus Scudder, 1958
- Caprhiobia Scudder, 1962
- Cerocrompus Scudder, 1958
- Congolorgus Scudder, 1962
- Crompus Stal, 1874
- Kleidocerys Stephens, 1829
- Koscocrompus Scudder, 1958
- Kualisompus Scudder, 1962
- Madrorgus Scudder, 1962
- Neocrompus China, 1930
- Neokleidocerys Scudder, 1962
- Oreolorgus Scudder, 1962
- Polychisme Kirkaldy, 1904
- Pylorgus Stal, 1874
- Rhiophila Bergroth, 1918
- Syzygitis Bergroth, 1921
