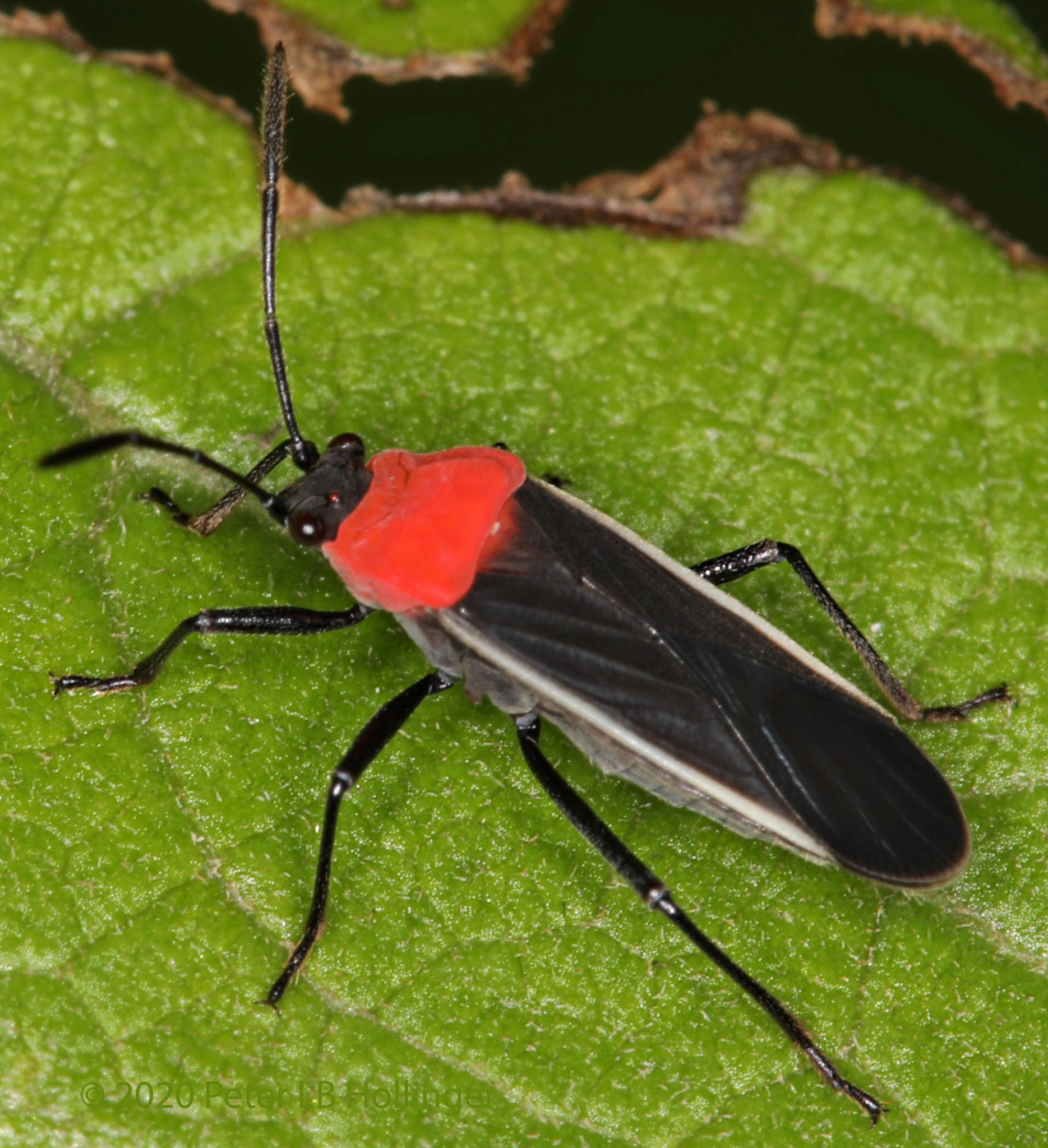
- Nicuesa speciosa

Scientific classification
- Domain: Eukaryota
- Kingdom: Animalia
- Phylum: Arthropoda
- Class: Insecta
- Order: Hemiptera
- Suborder: Heteroptera
- Family: Lygaeidae
- Genus: Nicuesa; Distant, 1882

= Nicuesa =

Genus of insects

Nicuesa is a genus of true bugs belonging to the family Lygaeidae.

The species of this genus are found in Central America.

Species:

- Nicuesa affinis Distant, 1901
- Nicuesa oculata Brailovsky & Brailovsky, 1979
- Nicuesa speciosa Distant, 1882
