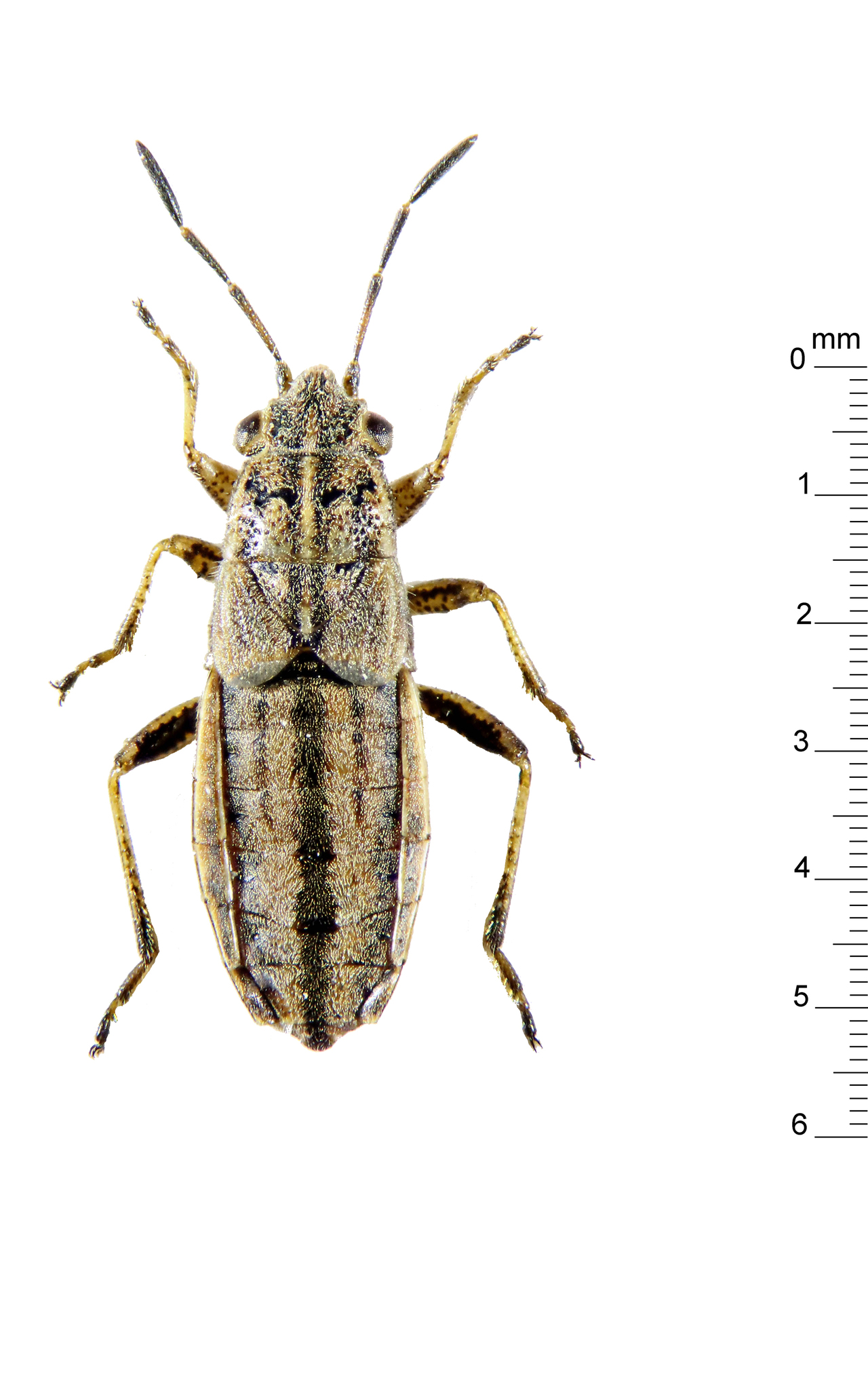
- Rhypodes anceps

Scientific classification
- Domain: Eukaryota
- Kingdom: Animalia
- Phylum: Arthropoda
- Class: Insecta
- Order: Hemiptera
- Suborder: Heteroptera
- Family: Lygaeidae
- Genus: Rhypodes; Stal, 1868

= Rhypodes =

Genus of insects in New Zealand

Rhypodes is a genus of Lygaeidae in the subfamily Orsillinae which is endemic to New Zealand. It was described by Carl Stål in 1868.

== Taxonomy ==
Rhypodes contains the following species:

- Rhypodes koebelei
- Rhypodes hirsutus
- Rhypodes crinitus
- Rhypodes stewartensis
- Rhypodes clavicornis
- Rhypodes brevispilis
- Rhypodes longirostris
- Rhypodes russatus
- Rhypodes sericatus
- Rhypodes rupestris
- Rhypodes triangulus
- Rhypodes argenteus
- Rhypodes eminens
- Rhypodes spadix
- Rhypodes myersi
- Rhypodes anceps
- Rhypodes atricornis
- Rhypodes brachypterus
- Rhypodes brevifissas
- Rhypodes bucculentus
- Rhypodes celmisiae
- Rhypodes cognatus
- Rhypodes gracilis
- Rhypodes longiceps
- Rhypodes townsendi
- Rhypodes chinai
- Rhypodes depilis
- Rhypodes jugatus
