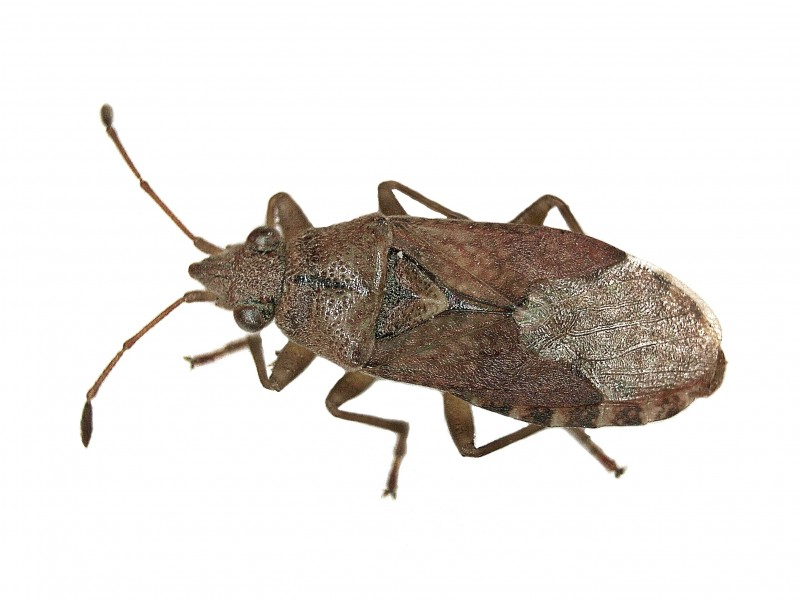
- Orsillus depressus

Scientific classification
- Domain: Eukaryota
- Kingdom: Animalia
- Phylum: Arthropoda
- Class: Insecta
- Order: Hemiptera
- Suborder: Heteroptera
- Family: Lygaeidae
- Subfamily: Orsillinae
- Tribe: Orsillini
- Genus: Orsillus; Dallas, 1852

= Orsillus =

Genus of true bugs

Orsillus is a genus of Palaearctic bugs, in the family Lygaeidae; it is the type genus of the subfamily Orsillinae and tribe Orsillini. Species are recorded from Europe and includes O. depressus which has become naturalised in the British Isles.

== Species ==
BioLib lists the following:

1. Orsillus depressus (Mulsant & Rey, 1852)
2. Orsillus maculatus (Fieber, 1861)
3. Orsillus pinicanariensis Lindberg, 1953
4. Orsillus potanini Linnavuori, 1978
5. Orsillus reyi Puton, 1871
