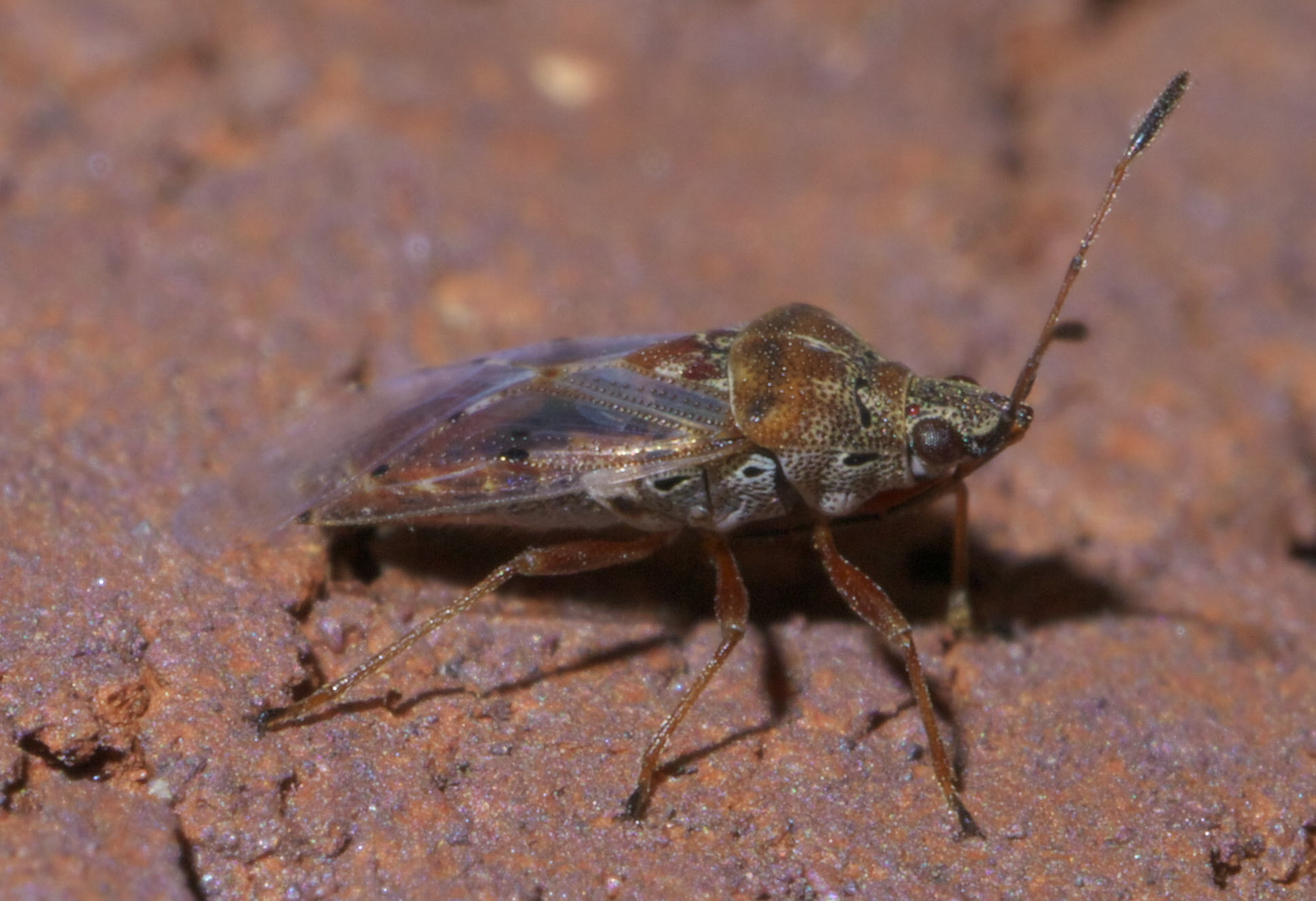
- Kleidocerys resedae

Scientific classification
- Kingdom: Animalia
- Phylum: Arthropoda
- Class: Insecta
- Order: Hemiptera
- Suborder: Heteroptera
- Family: Lygaeidae
- Subfamily: Ischnorhynchinae
- Genus: Kleidocerys; Stephens, 1829

Synonyms
- Ischnorhynchus Fieber, 1860

= Kleidocerys =

Genus of true bugs

Kleidocerys is a genus of seed bugs in the family Lygaeidae. There are about 17 described species in Kleidocerys.

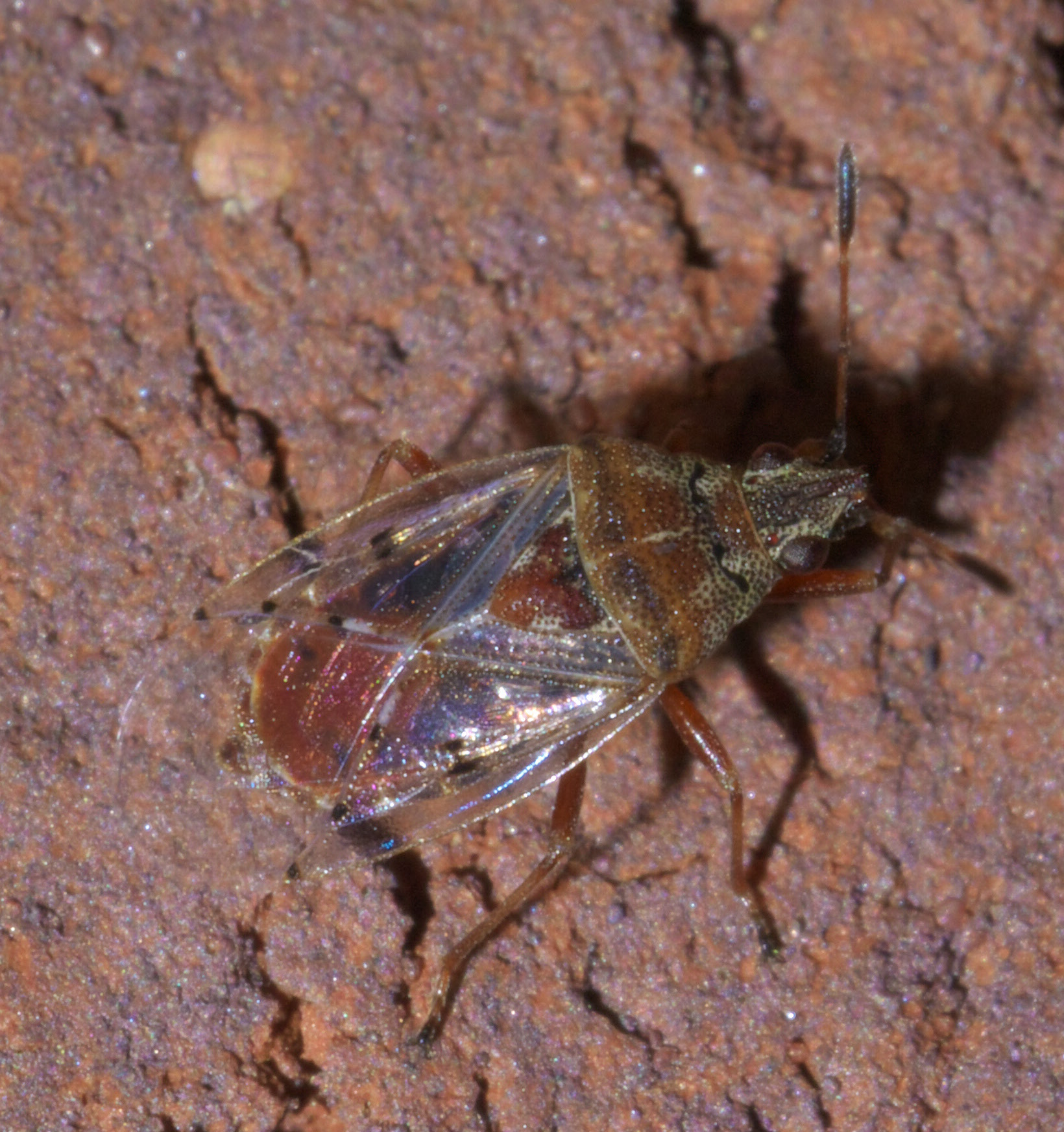
Kleidocerys resedae

== Species ==
These 17 species belong to the genus Kleidocerys:

- Kleidocerys costaricensis Cervantes & Brailovsky, 2010
- Kleidocerys denticollis (Stal, 1874)
- Kleidocerys dimidiatus Barber, 1953
- Kleidocerys ericae (Horvath, 1909)
- Kleidocerys franciscanus (Stal, 1859)
- Kleidocerys hispaniola Baranowski, 2005
- Kleidocerys modestus Barber, 1953
- Kleidocerys nubilus (Distant, 1883)
- Kleidocerys obovatus (Van Duzee, 1931)
- Kleidocerys ovalis Barber, 1953
- Kleidocerys pallipes Brailovsky, 1976
- Kleidocerys privignus (Horvath, 1894)
- Kleidocerys punctatus (Distant, 1893)
- Kleidocerys resedae (Panzer, 1793) (birch catkin bug)
- Kleidocerys suffusus Barber, 1947
- Kleidocerys truncatulus (Walker, 1872)
- Kleidocerys virescens Fabricius, 1794
