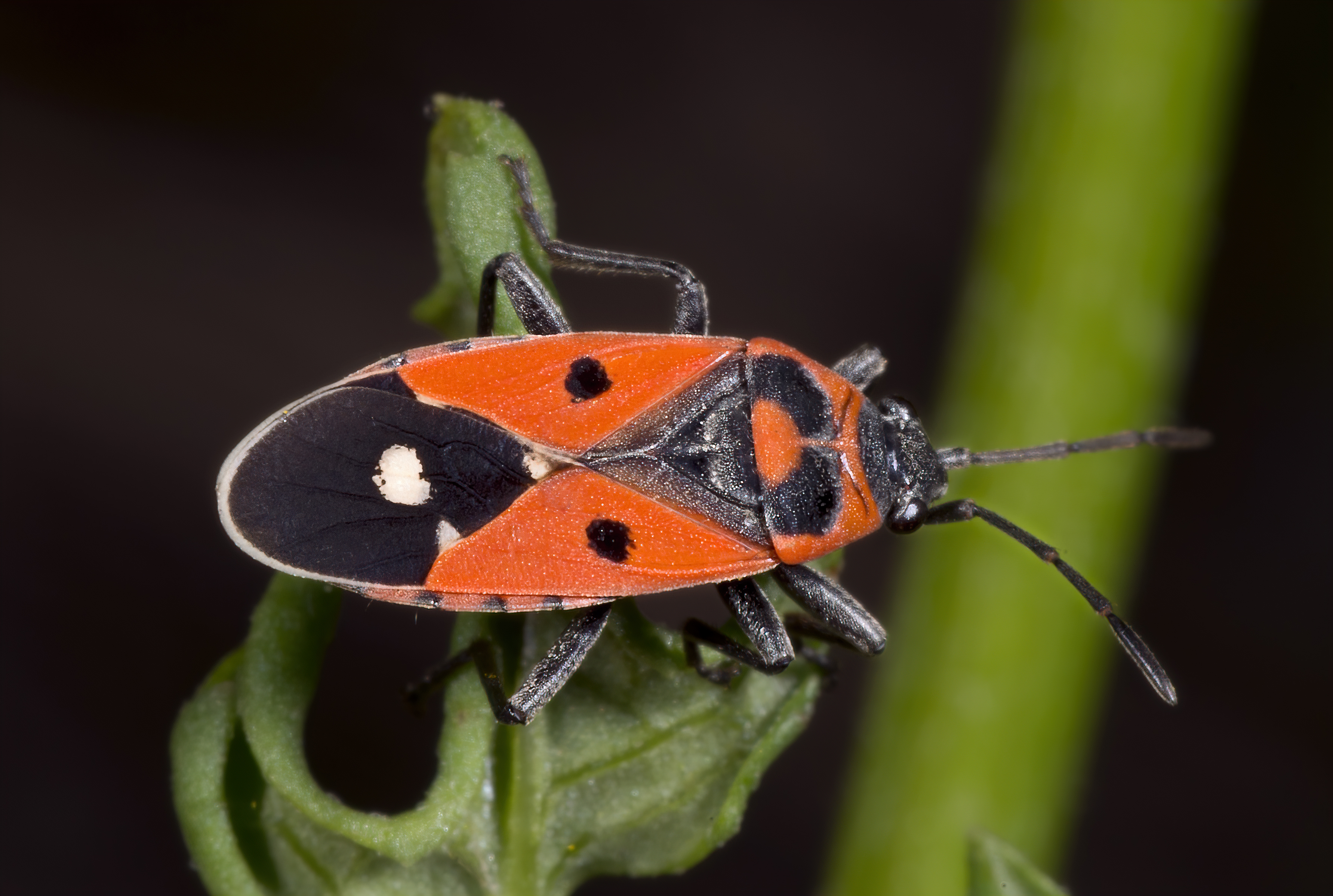
- Melanocoryphus albomaculatus

Scientific classification
- Kingdom: Animalia
- Phylum: Arthropoda
- Class: Insecta
- Order: Hemiptera
- Suborder: Heteroptera
- Family: Lygaeidae
- Subfamily: Lygaeinae
- Genus: Melanocoryphus; Stal, 1872

= Melanocoryphus =

Genus of insects

Melanocoryphus is a genus of seed bugs in the family Lygaeidae. There are about eight described species in Melanocoryphus.

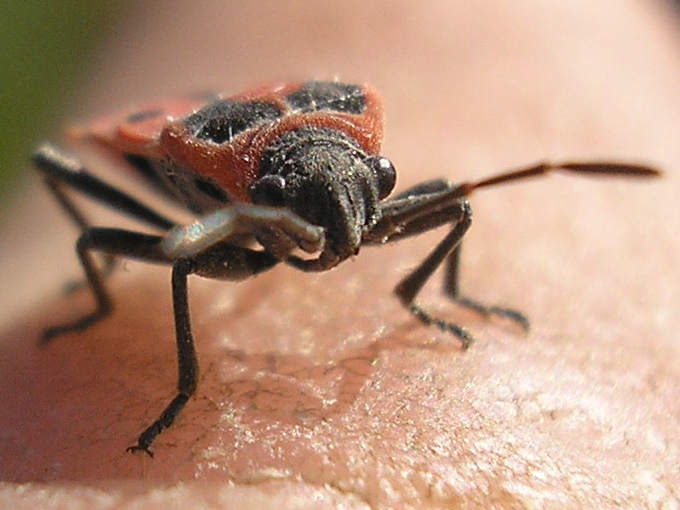
Melanocoryphus albomaculatus

== Species ==
Melanocoryphus albomaculatus Goeze, 1778
Melanocoryphus buettikeri Hamid & Hamid, 1985
Melanocoryphus exutus Horvath, 1916
Melanocoryphus japonicus (Walker, 1872)
Melanocoryphus kerzhneri Josifov, 1965
Melanocoryphus melanospiloides (Montandon, 1893)
Melanocoryphus parvipennis Horvath, 1916
Melanocoryphus tristrami (Douglas & Scott, 1868)
