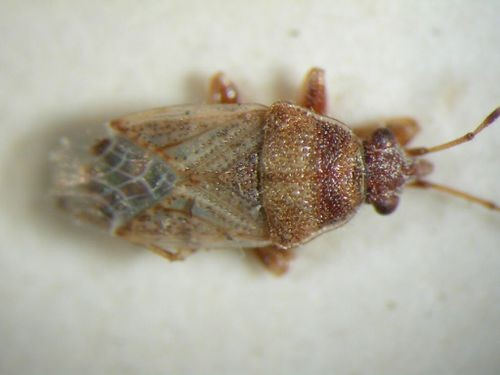
- Crompus opacus

Scientific classification
- Kingdom: Animalia
- Phylum: Arthropoda
- Class: Insecta
- Order: Hemiptera
- Suborder: Heteroptera
- Infraorder: Pentatomomorpha
- Superfamily: Lygaeoidea
- Family: Lygaeidae
- Genus: Crompus; Stål, 1874

= Crompus =

Genus of true bugs

Crompus is a genus of seed bugs in the family Lygaeidae. Crompus are terrestrial insects in the Ischnorhynchinae subfamily of seed bugs that are endemic to Australia. There are three described species in Crompus.

== Species ==
These three species belong to the genus Crompus:

- Crompus nesiotes Ashlock, 1967
- Crompus oculatus Stål, 1874
- Crompus opacus Scudder, 1958
