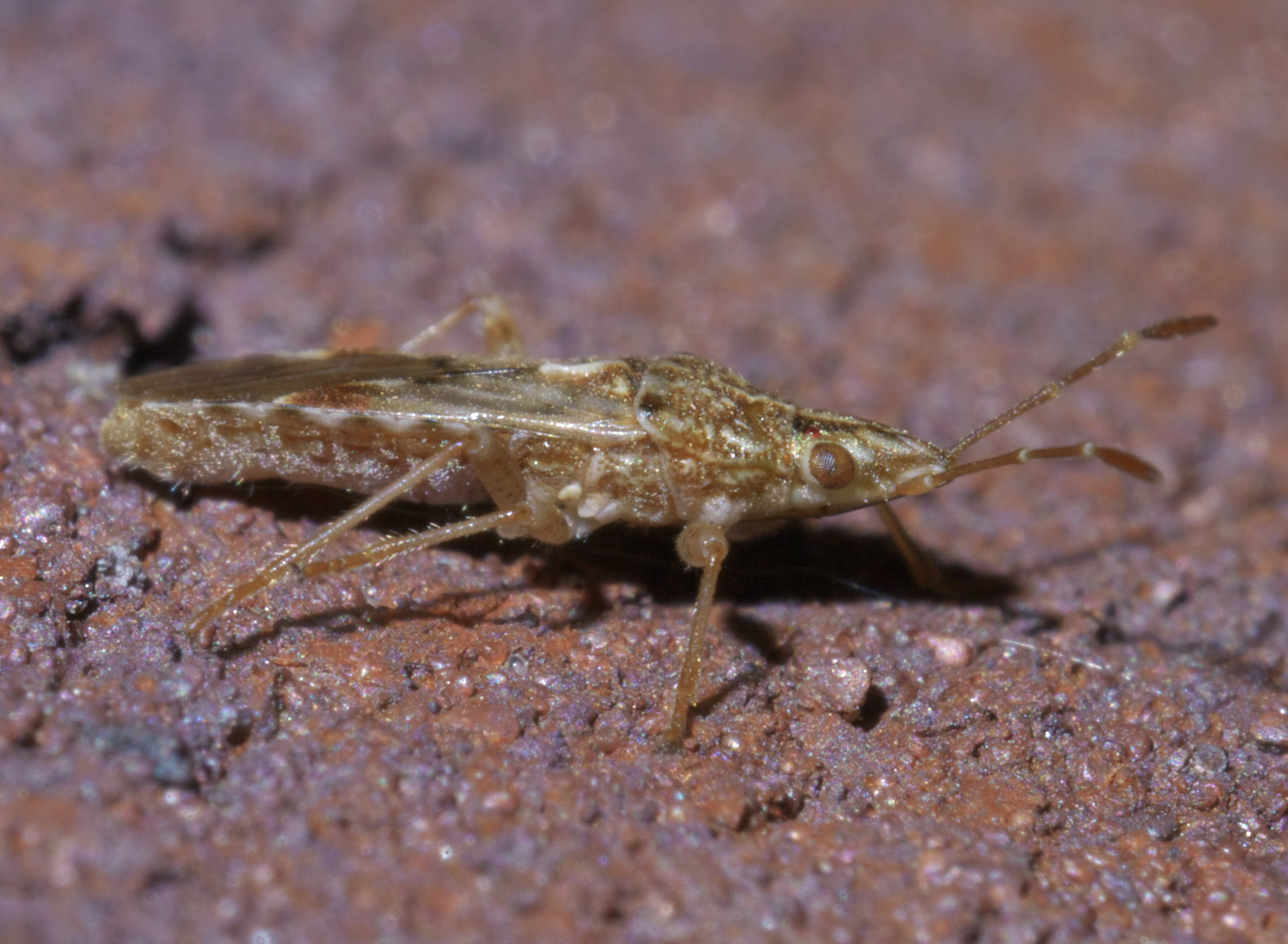

Scientific classification
- Kingdom: Animalia
- Phylum: Arthropoda
- Class: Insecta
- Order: Hemiptera
- Suborder: Heteroptera
- Family: Lygaeidae
- Tribe: Orsillini
- Genus: Belonochilus; Uhler, 1871
- Species: B. numenius

Binomial name
- Belonochilus numenius (Say, 1831)

= Belonochilus =

Genus of true bugs

Belonochilus is a genus of seed bugs in the family Lygaeidae. There is one described species in Belonochilus, B. numenius, the sycamore seed bug, making it a monotypic genus.

It is native to North America, but is an invasive species in Europe. It primarily feeds on Platanus trees and lays its eggs on fruit, although some overwinter beneath the bark of the trees they feed on.

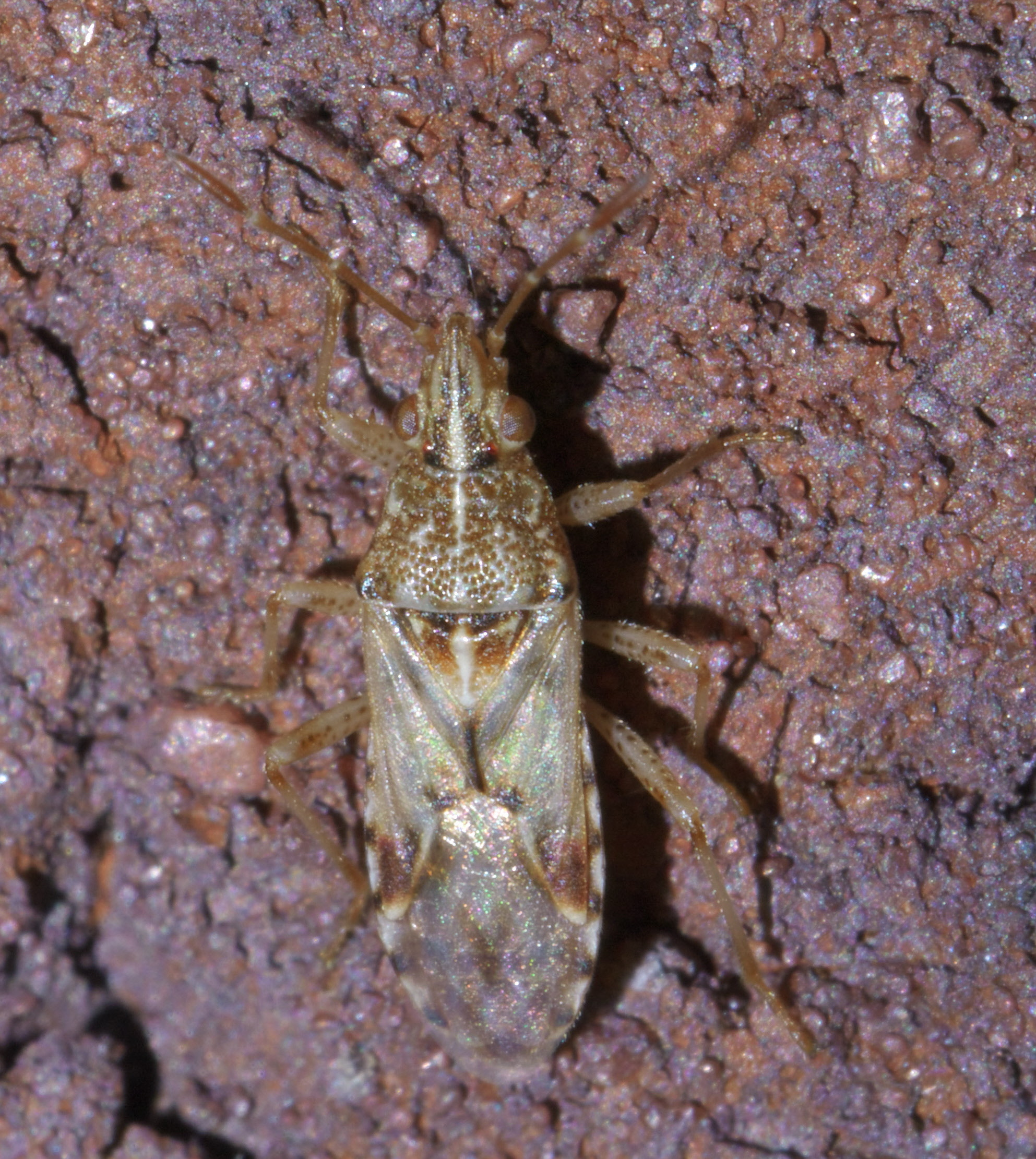
Belonochilus numenius
