= Ortholomus =

Scientific classification
- Domain: Eukaryota
- Kingdom: Animalia
- Phylum: Arthropoda
- Class: Insecta
- Order: Hemiptera
- Suborder: Heteroptera
- Family: Lygaeidae
- Tribe: Orsillini
- Genus: Ortholomus; Stal, 1872

Genus of true bugs

Ortholomus is a genus of true bugs belonging to the family Lygaeidae.

The species of this genus are found in Europe.

Species:

- Ortholomus carinatus (Lindberg, 1932)
- Ortholomus jordani Hoberlandt, 1953
- Ortholomus punctipennis (Herrich-Schaeffer, 1850)
