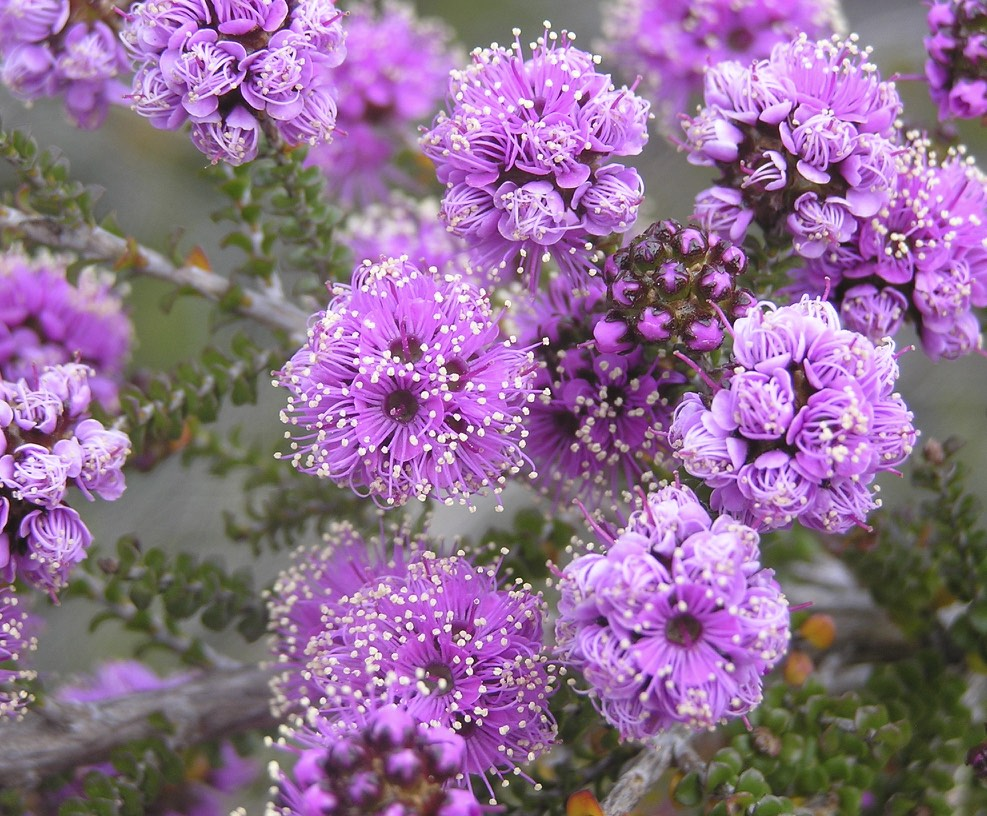
- Kunzea recurva growing in the Hassell National Park

Scientific classification
- Kingdom: Plantae
- Clade: Tracheophytes
- Clade: Angiosperms
- Clade: Eudicots
- Clade: Rosids
- Order: Myrtales
- Family: Myrtaceae
- Genus: Kunzea
- Species: K. recurva

Binomial name
- Kunzea recurva Schauer

Synonyms
- Kunzea recurva var. melaleucoides F.Muell. ex Benth. p.p.; Kunzea recurva Schauer var. recurva; Kunzea spicata S.Moore

= Kunzea recurva =

Species of shrub

Kunzea recurva is a flowering plant in the myrtle family, Myrtaceae and is endemic to Western Australia. It is an uncommon shrub with small leaves and groups of pink or purplish flowers on the ends of the branches.

== Description ==
Kunzea recurva is an erect, highly branched shrub which grows to a height of 0.3 to 2 metres (1 to 7 ft) with hairy young branches. The base of the leaves is pressed against the stem but the tips spread outwards. They are mostly egg-shaped with the narrower end towards the base, mostly 2–2.5 mm (0.08–0.1 in) long and 1.5–3 mm (0.06–0.1 in) wide on a short stalk. The flowers are pink to reddish purple and are borne in more or less spherical groups about 15 mm (0.6 in) across on the ends of the branches. The petals lobes are egg-shaped to spatula-shaped about 2 mm (0.08 in) in diameter and there are mostly 20 to 35 stamens 3.5–5 mm (0.1–0.2 in) long in each flower. Flowering occurs between August and December but mostly between September and November and the fruit that follows is an urn-shaped capsule with the sepal lobes remaining.

== Taxonomy and naming ==
Kunzea recurva was first formally described by the botanist Johannes Conrad Schauer and published in 1844 in Johann Georg Christian Lehmann's work Plantae Preissianae. The specific epithet (recurva) is derived from the Latin word, curvus meaning "bent".

== Distribution and habitat ==
Kunzea recurva is an uncommon species, usually found in wet depressions or on rocky slopes in the South West and Great Southern regions of Western Australia, where it grows in a variety of soil types.
