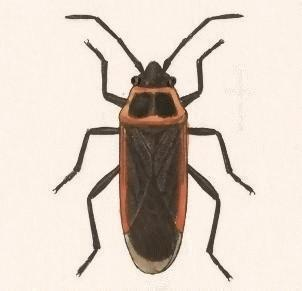
- Acroleucus brevicollis

Scientific classification
- Kingdom: Animalia
- Phylum: Arthropoda
- Class: Insecta
- Order: Hemiptera
- Suborder: Heteroptera
- Infraorder: Pentatomomorpha
- Superfamily: Lygaeoidea
- Family: Lygaeidae; Schilling, 1829

Diversity
- at least 110 genera

= Lygaeidae =

Family of true bugs

The Lygaeidae are a family in the Hemiptera (true bugs), with more than 110 genera in four subfamilies. The family is commonly referred to as seed bugs, and less commonly, milkweed bugs, or ground bugs. Many species feed on seeds, some on sap or seed pods, others are omnivores and a few, such as the wekiu bug, are insectivores. Insects in this family are distributed across the world.

The family was vastly larger, but numerous former subfamilies have been removed and given independent family status, including the Artheneidae, Blissidae, Cryptorhamphidae, Cymidae, Geocoridae, Heterogastridae, Ninidae, Oxycarenidae and Rhyparochromidae, which together constituted well over half of the former family.

The bizarre and mysterious beetle-like Psamminae were formerly often placed in the Piesmatidae, but this is almost certainly incorrect. Their true affiliations are not entirely resolved.

== Distinguishing characteristics ==
Lygaeidae are oval or elongate in body shape and have four-segmented antennae. Lygaeidae can be distinguished from Miridae (plant bugs) by the presence of ocelli, or simple eyes. They are distinguished from Coreidae (squash bugs) by the number of veins in the membrane of the front wings, as Lygaeidae have only four or five veins.

== Subfamilies and selected genera ==
An incomplete list of Lygaeidae genera is subdivided as:

subfamily Ischnorhynchinae Stål, 1872

- Crompus Stål, 1874
- Kleidocerys Stephens, 1829

subfamily Lygaeinae Schilling, 1829

- Lygaeus Fabricius, 1794
- Oncopeltus Stål, 1868
- Melanocoryphus Stål, 1872
- Spilostethus Stål, 1868
- Tropidothorax Bergroth, 1894

subfamily Orsillinae Stål, 1872

- Nysius Dallas, 1852
- Orsillus Dallas, 1852

subfamily † Lygaenocorinae
Unplaced genera

- Lygaeites Heer, 1853

The Pachygronthinae Stål, 1865 (type genus Pachygrontha Germar, 1840) may be placed here or elevated to the family Pachygronthidae.

== Gallery ==
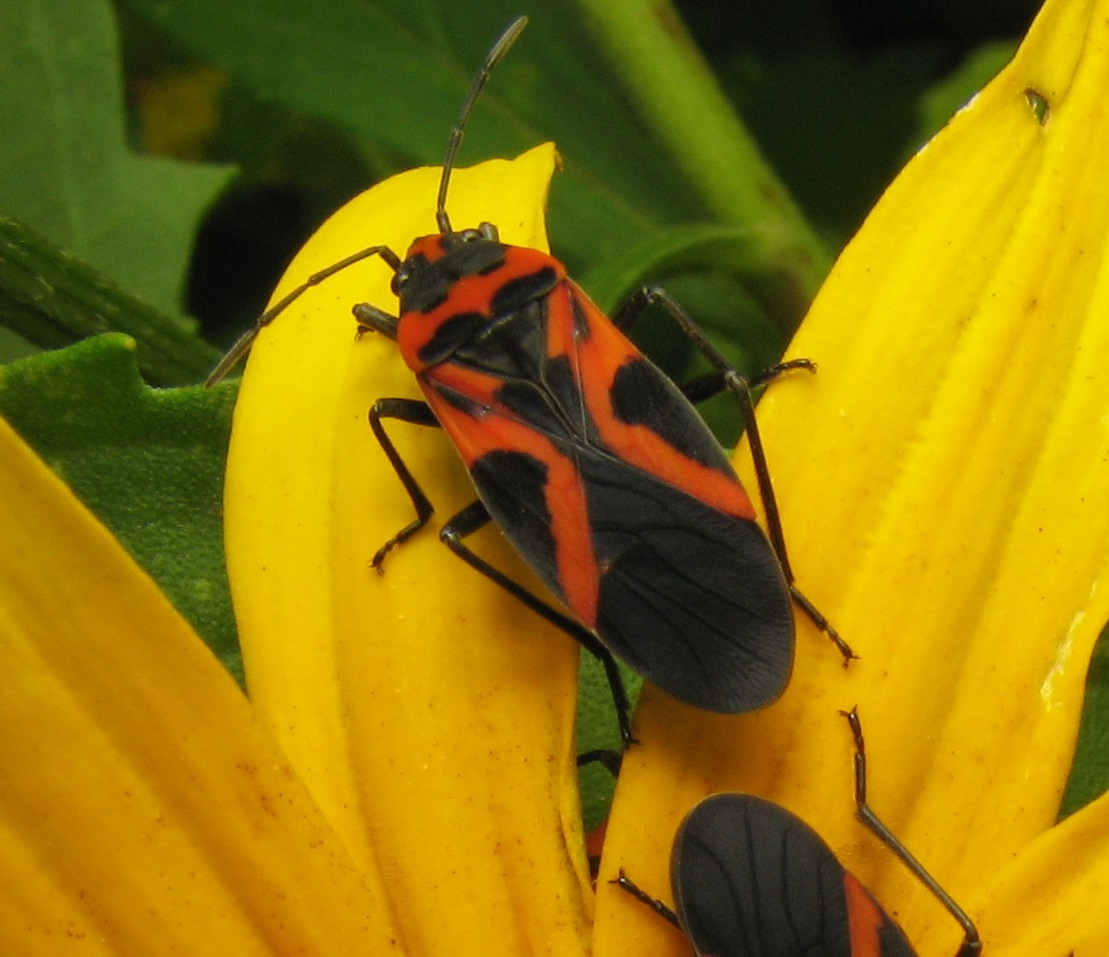
False milkweed bug, Lygaeus turcicus, on Asteraceae flower

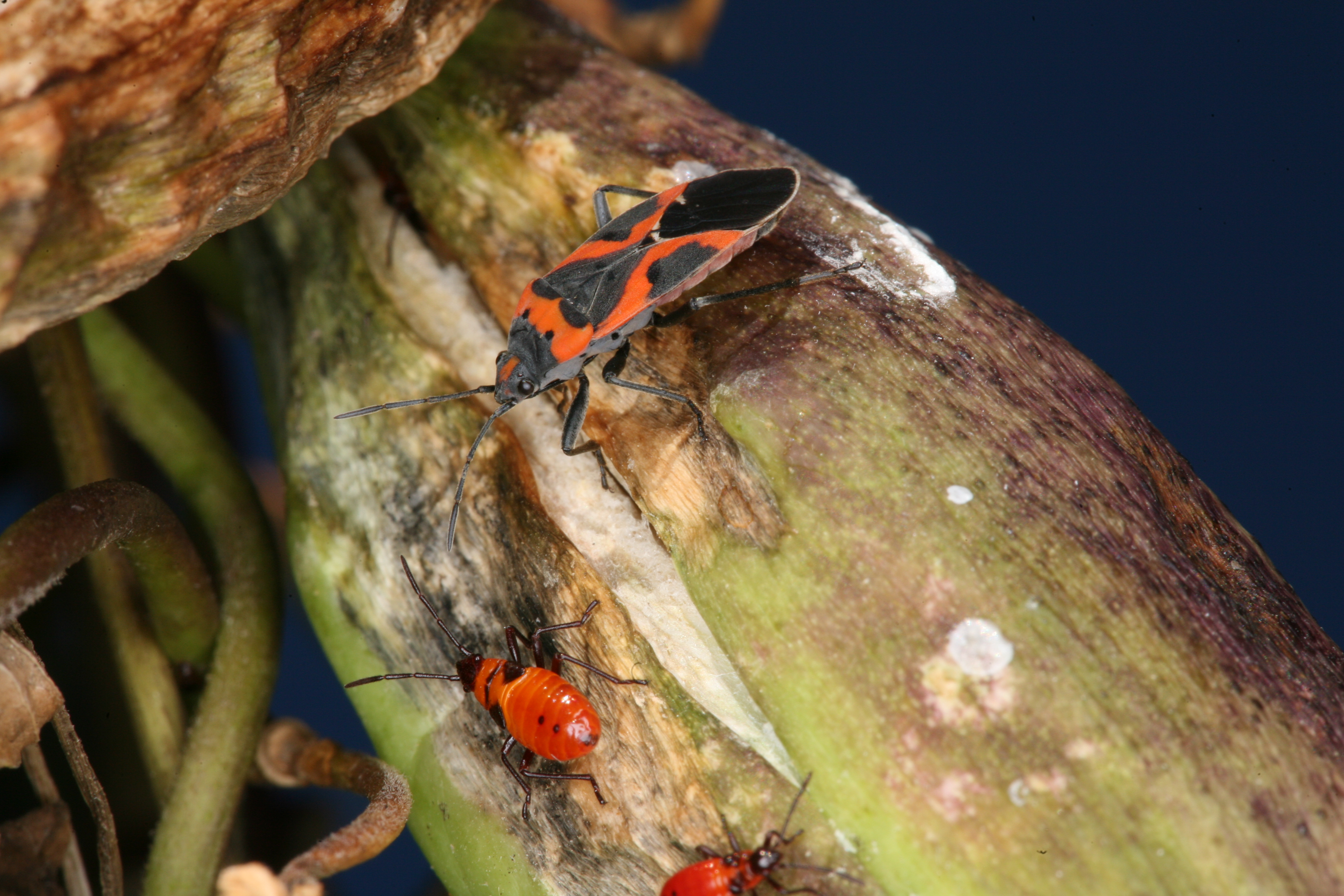
Small milkweed bug, Lygaeus kalmii), nymph (bottom) and mature (top)

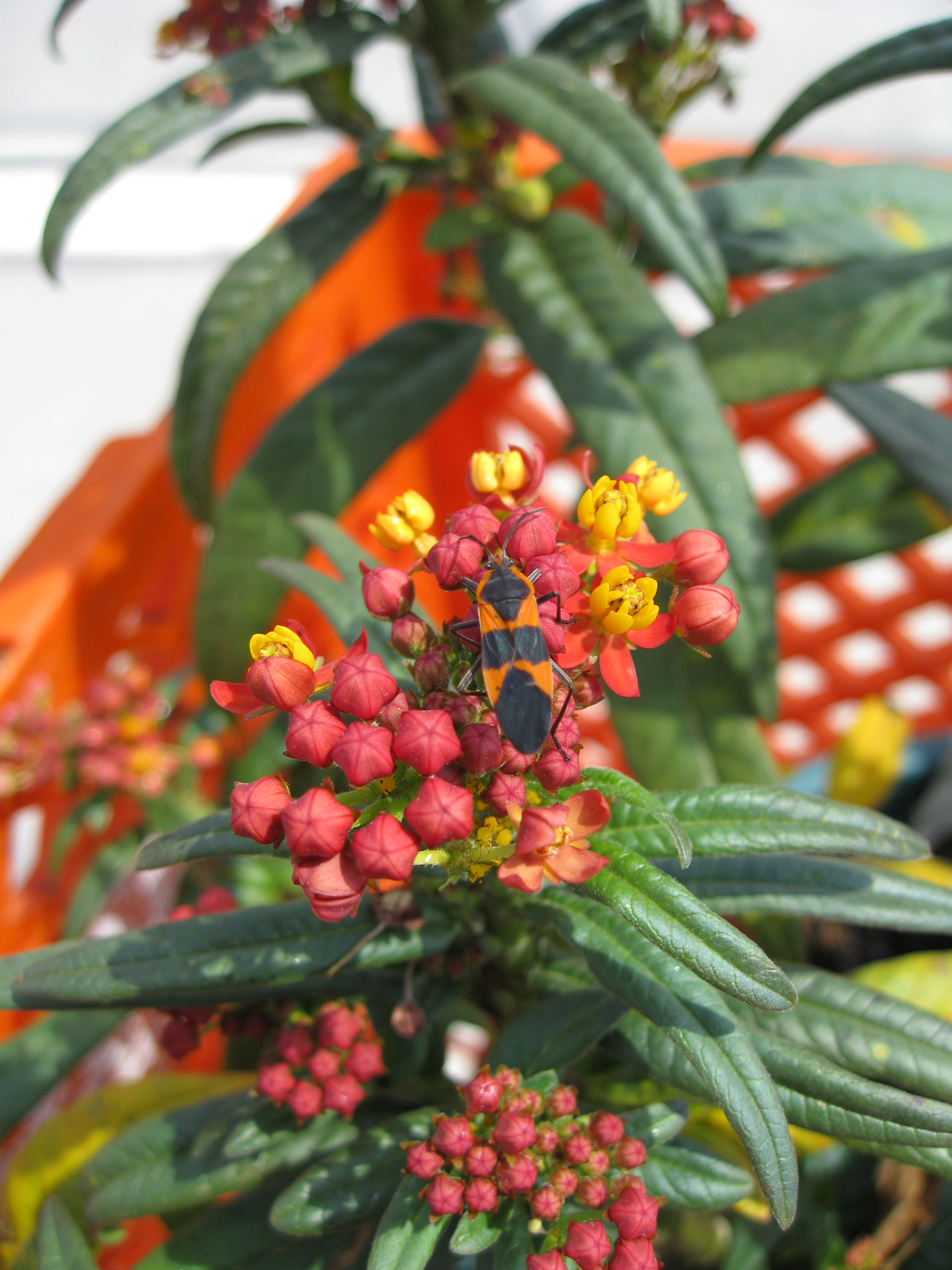
Large milkweed bug, Oncopeltus fasciatus, on a butterfly weed

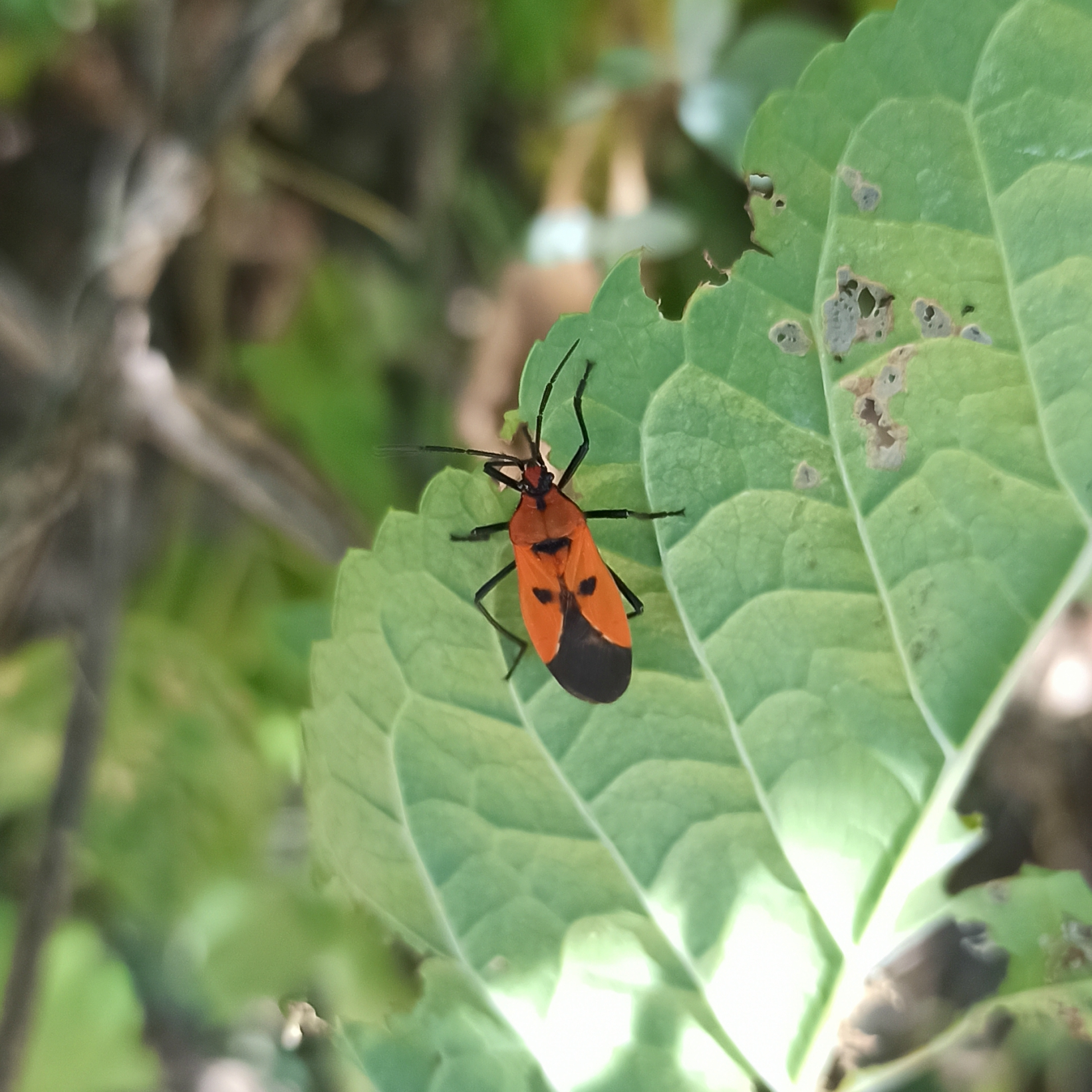
Oncopeltus varicolor ssp. stalii

Large milkweed bug nymph feeding on milkweed before extracting its stylet, sheathing it again in its rostrum
