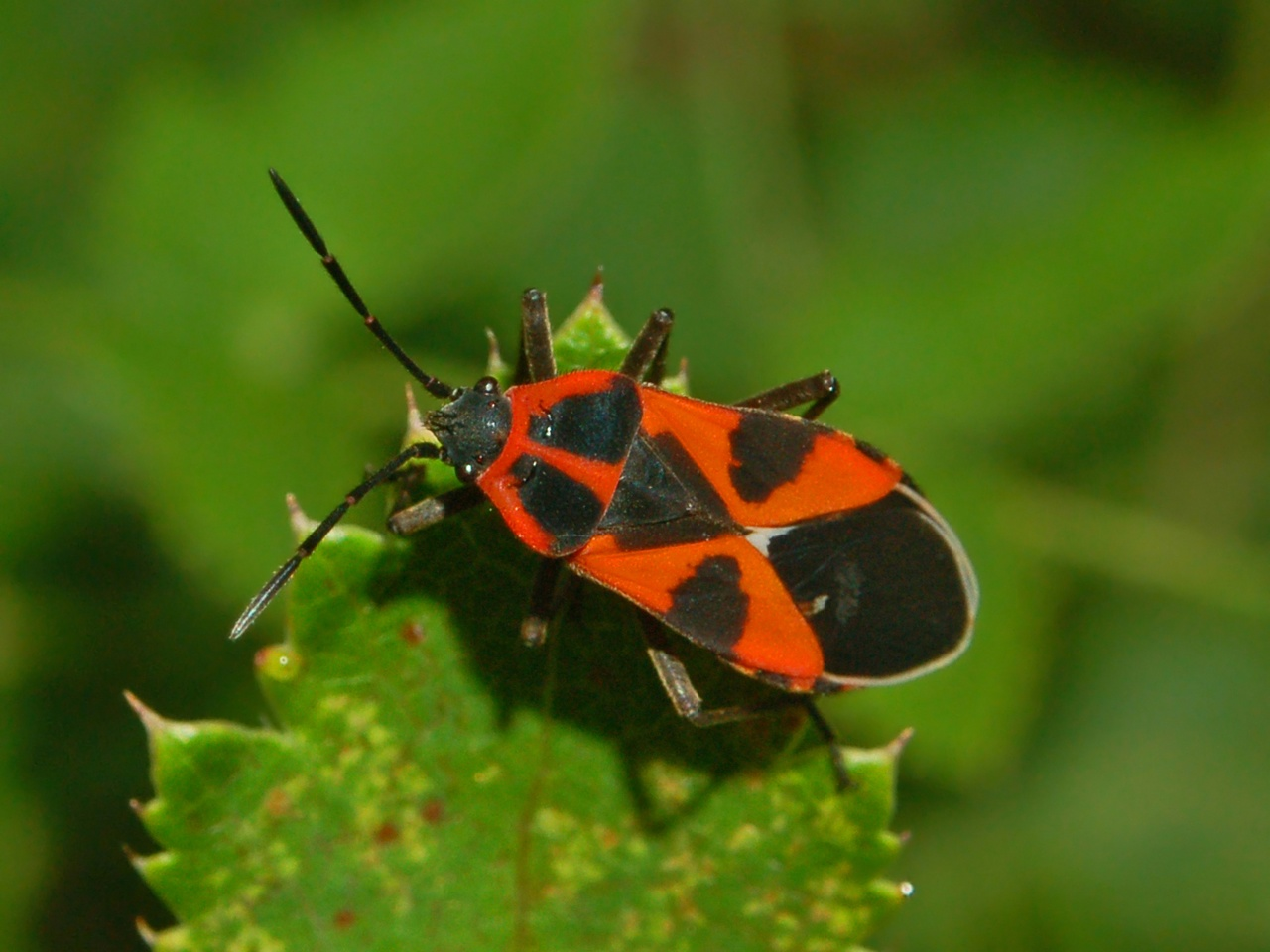
- Upperside

Scientific classification
- Domain: Eukaryota
- Kingdom: Animalia
- Phylum: Arthropoda
- Class: Insecta
- Order: Hemiptera
- Suborder: Heteroptera
- Family: Lygaeidae
- Genus: Tropidothorax
- Species: T. leucopterus

Binomial name
- Tropidothorax leucopterus (Goeze, 1778)

Synonyms
- Cimex leucopterus Goeze, 1778; Lygaeus simla Distant, 1909

= Tropidothorax leucopterus =

Species of true bug

Tropidothorax leucopterus is a species of ground bugs belonging to the family Lygaeidae, subfamily Lygaeinae.

== Description ==
Tropidothorax leucopterus can reach a length of 9–10 millimetres (0.35–0.39 in). Bodies of these bugs are oval-elongated, with a striking red-black warning color. The head is black, with a small red spot in the middle.

The pronotum is basically black, with black lateral margins, a black middle stripe and a red stripe at the front edge. Pronotum has a middle keel running from the front edge to the posterior margin. The scutellum and clavus of the hemielytra are black. Corium is predominantly red. The membrane is matt black, with a white spot at the inner angle. Connexivum is alternately black and red spotted. The abdomen is red with black spots. Both the antennae as well as the legs are black.

== Distribution and habitat ==
This species can be found in most of central and southern Europe, North Africa, Turkey, the Caucasus, Iran and in Central Asia.

In Europe these bugs are present in Albania, Austria, Belgium, Bosnia and Herzegovina, Bulgaria, Croatia, Czech Republic, France, Germany, Greece, Hungary, Italy, Lithuania, Moldova, Russia, Poland, Portugal, Romania, Slovakia, Slovenia, Spain, Switzerland and Yugoslavia),

== Biology ==
These bugs mainly feed on white swallow-wort (Vincetoxicum hirundinaria) and broadleaf milkweed (Asclepias syriaca).

The red-black coloring is a warning (aposematism), as they are poisonous by storing substances from their poisonous host plants. The birds learn to avoid these prey.

== Gallery ==
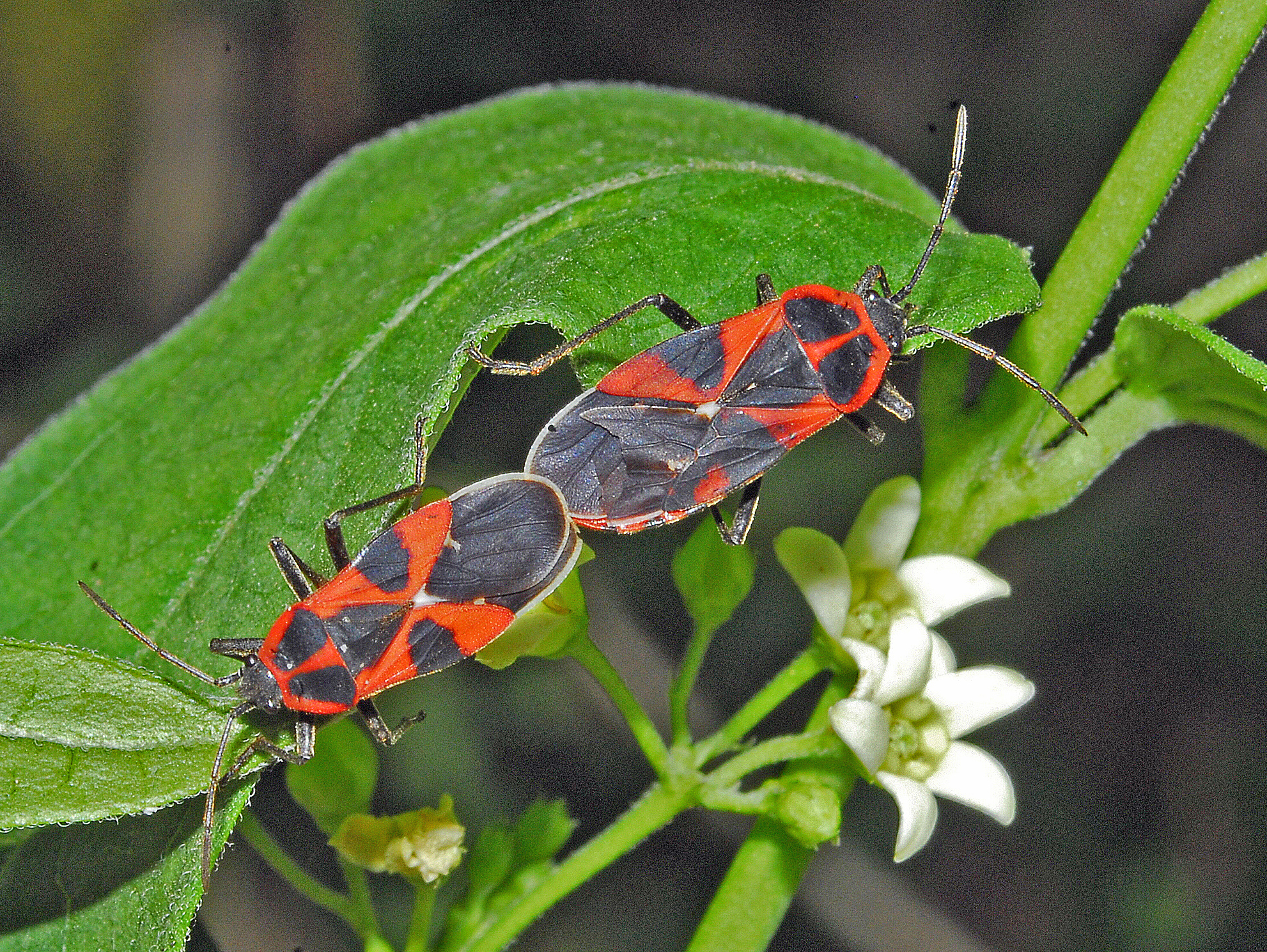
Mating on the host plant Vincetoxicum hirundinaria

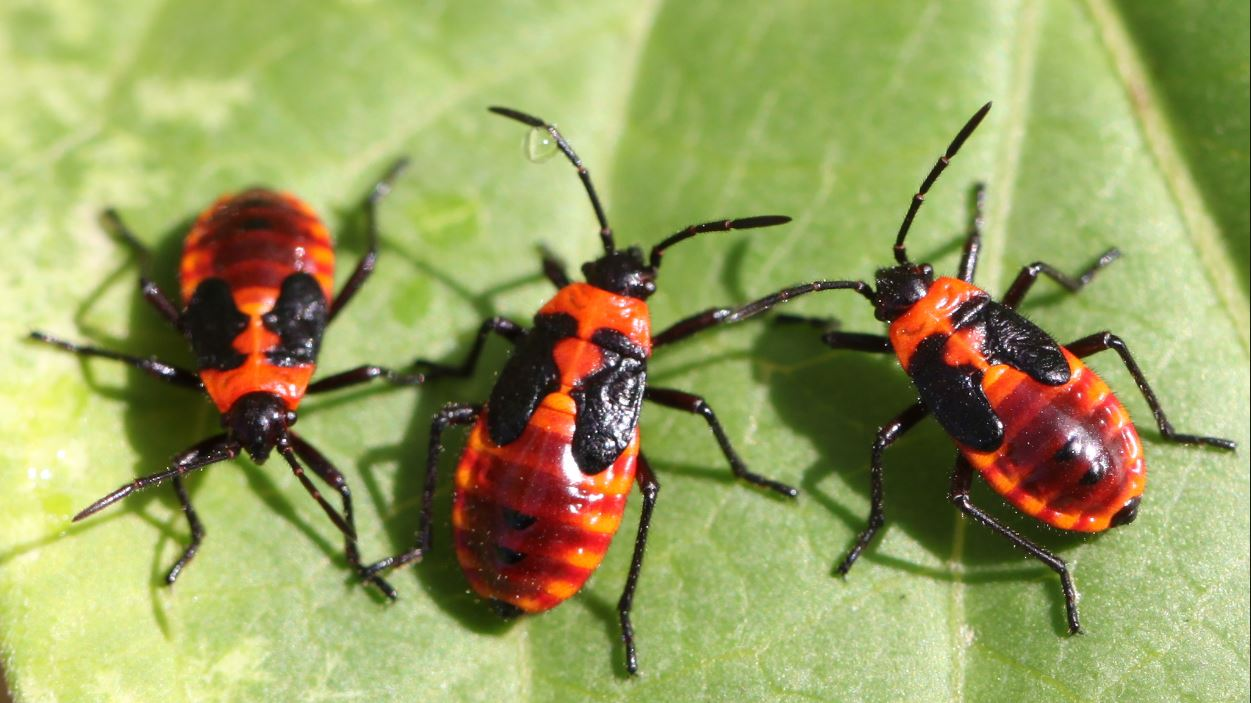
Nymphs

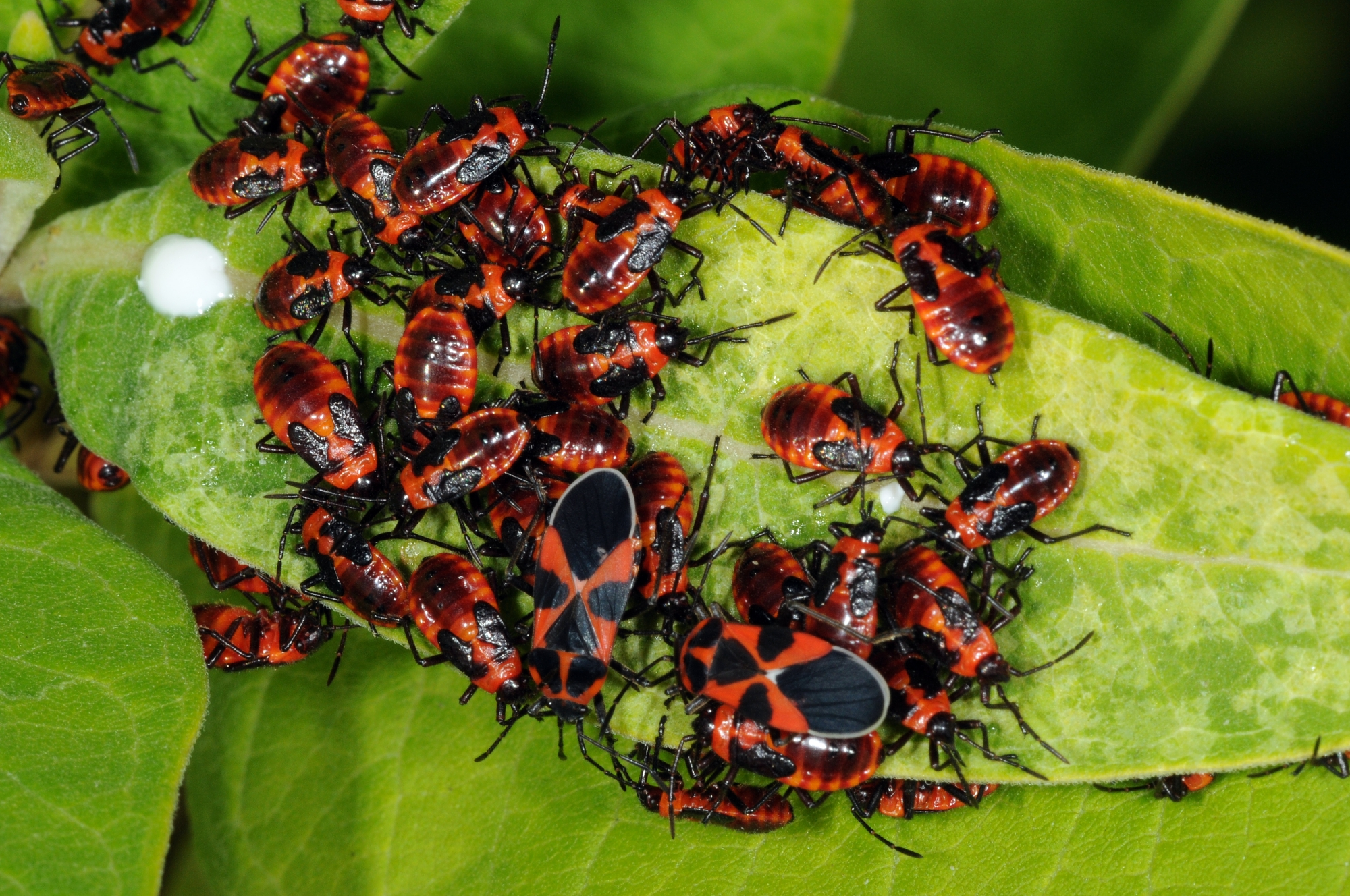
Aggregation of nymphs and adults
