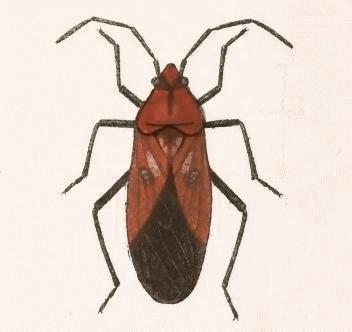

Scientific classification
- Domain: Eukaryota
- Kingdom: Animalia
- Phylum: Arthropoda
- Class: Insecta
- Order: Hemiptera
- Suborder: Heteroptera
- Family: Lygaeidae
- Subfamily: Lygaeinae
- Genus: Oncopeltus
- Species: O. varicolor

Binomial name
- Oncopeltus varicolor (Fabricius, 1794)

= Oncopeltus varicolor =

Species of true bug

Oncopeltus varicolor is a species of seed bug in the family Lygaeidae, found in North, Central, and South America.

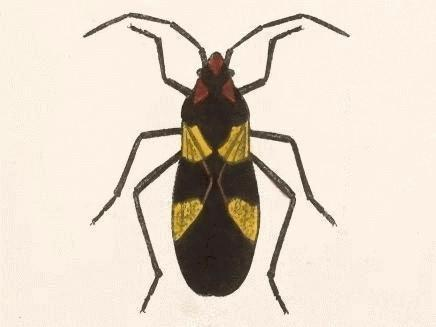
Oncopeltus varicolor

== Subspecies ==
These two subspecies belong to the species Oncopeltus varicolor:

- Oncopeltus varicolor stalii Distant, 1882
- Oncopeltus varicolor varicolor (Fabricius, 1794)
