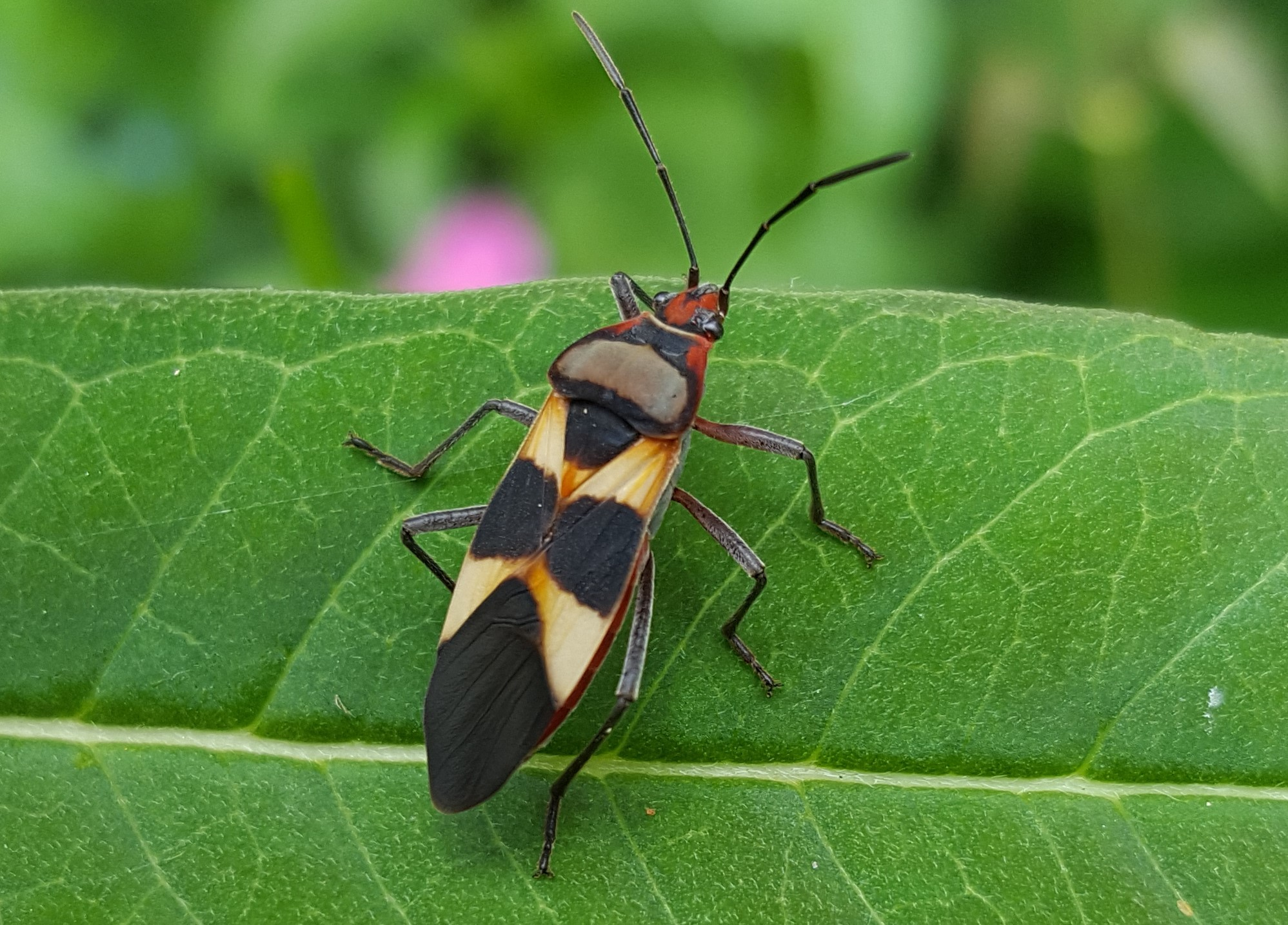
- Oncopeltus unifasciatellus, Brazil

Scientific classification
- Kingdom: Animalia
- Phylum: Arthropoda
- Clade: Pancrustacea
- Class: Insecta
- Order: Hemiptera
- Suborder: Heteroptera
- Family: Lygaeidae
- Subfamily: Lygaeinae
- Genus: Oncopeltus
- Species: O. unifasciatellus

Binomial name
- Oncopeltus unifasciatellus Slater, 1964

= Oncopeltus unifasciatellus =

Species of seed bug

Oncopeltus unifasciatellus is a species of seed bug in the family Lygaeidae, found in the Neotropics.
