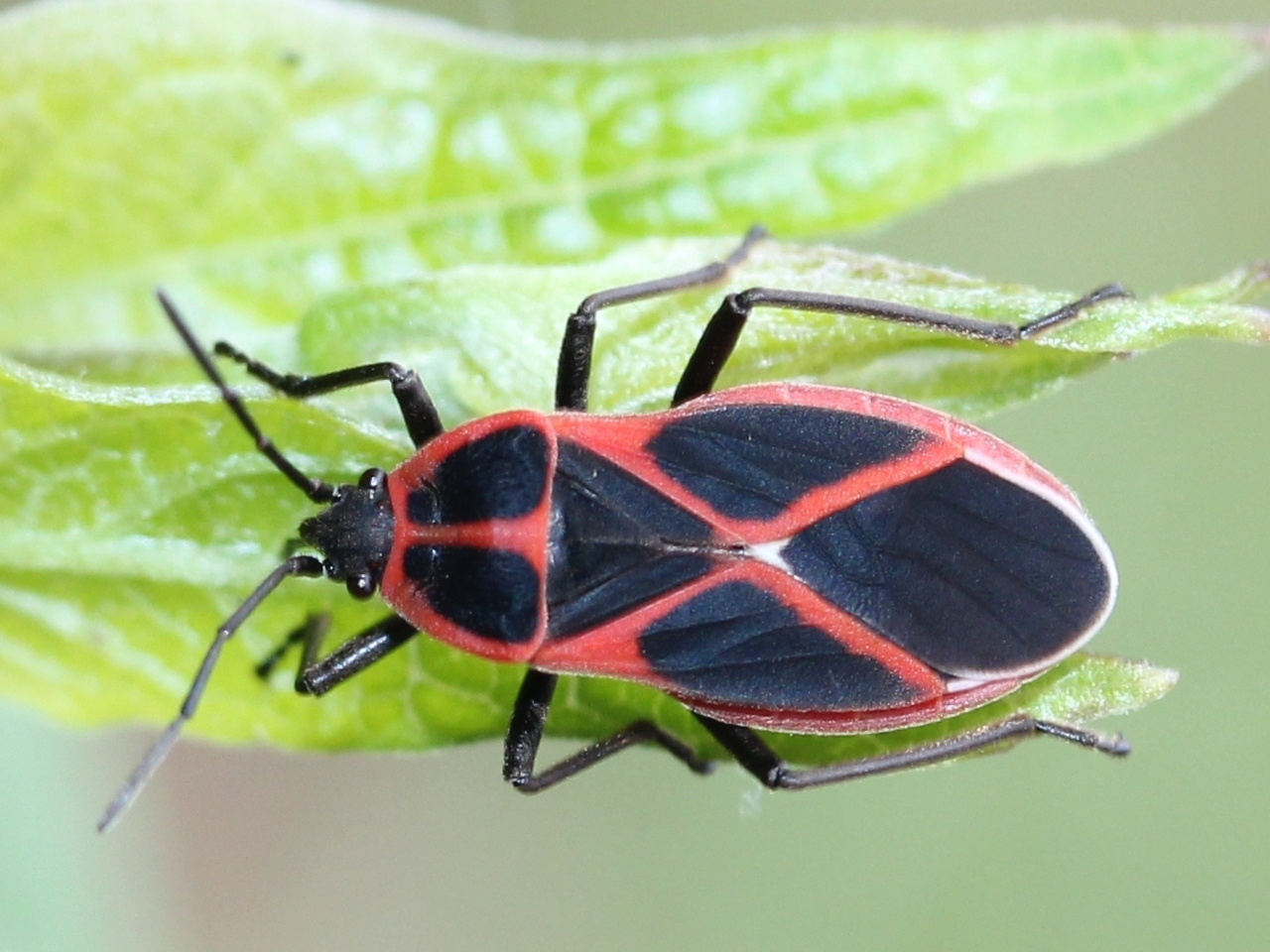

Scientific classification
- Domain: Eukaryota
- Kingdom: Animalia
- Phylum: Arthropoda
- Class: Insecta
- Order: Hemiptera
- Suborder: Heteroptera
- Family: Lygaeidae
- Subfamily: Lygaeinae
- Genus: Tropidothorax
- Species: T. cruciger

Binomial name
- Tropidothorax cruciger (Motschulsky, 1859)

= Tropidothorax cruciger =

Species of true bug

Tropidothorax cruciger is a species of seed bug in the family Lygaeidae found in Asia.

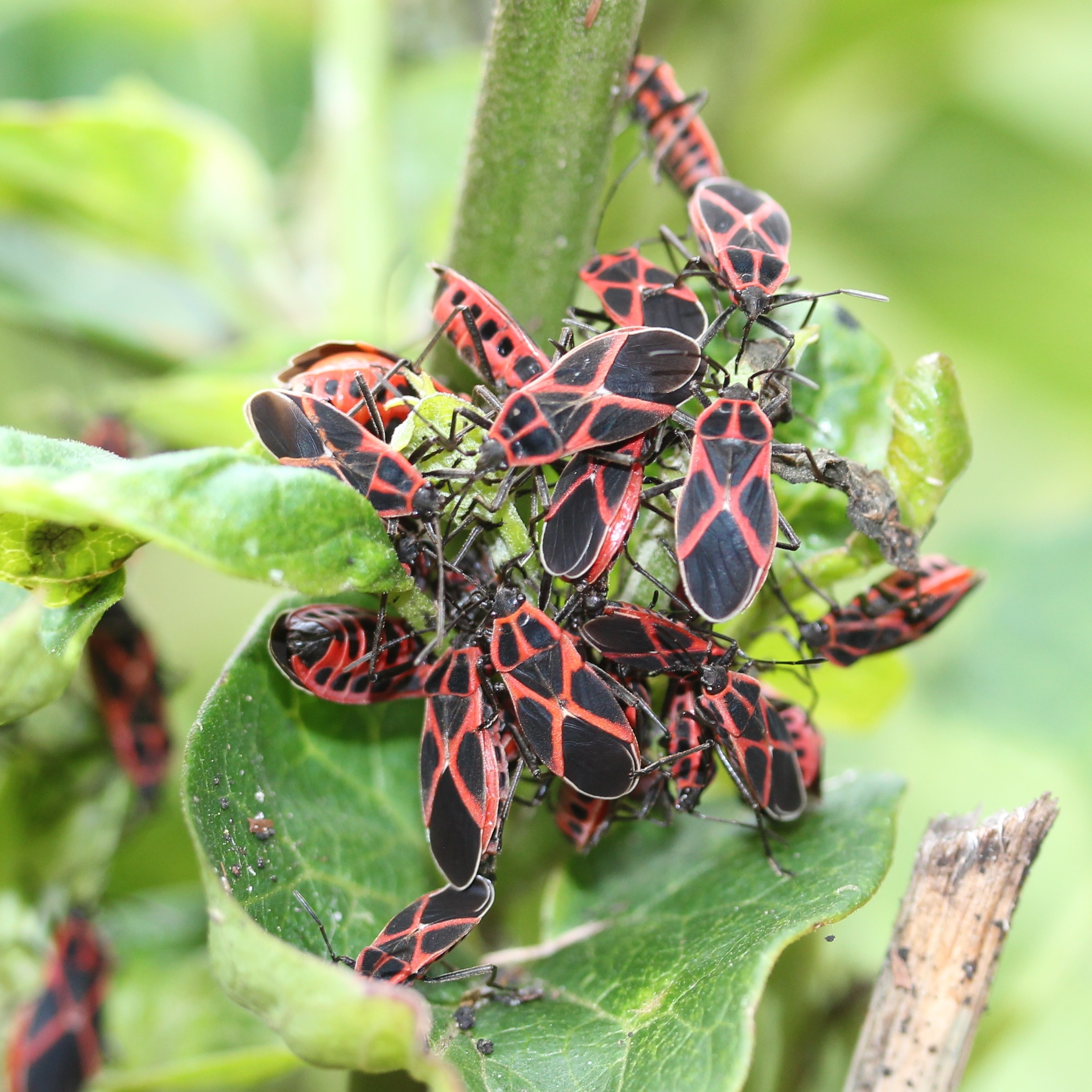
Tropidothorax cruciger
