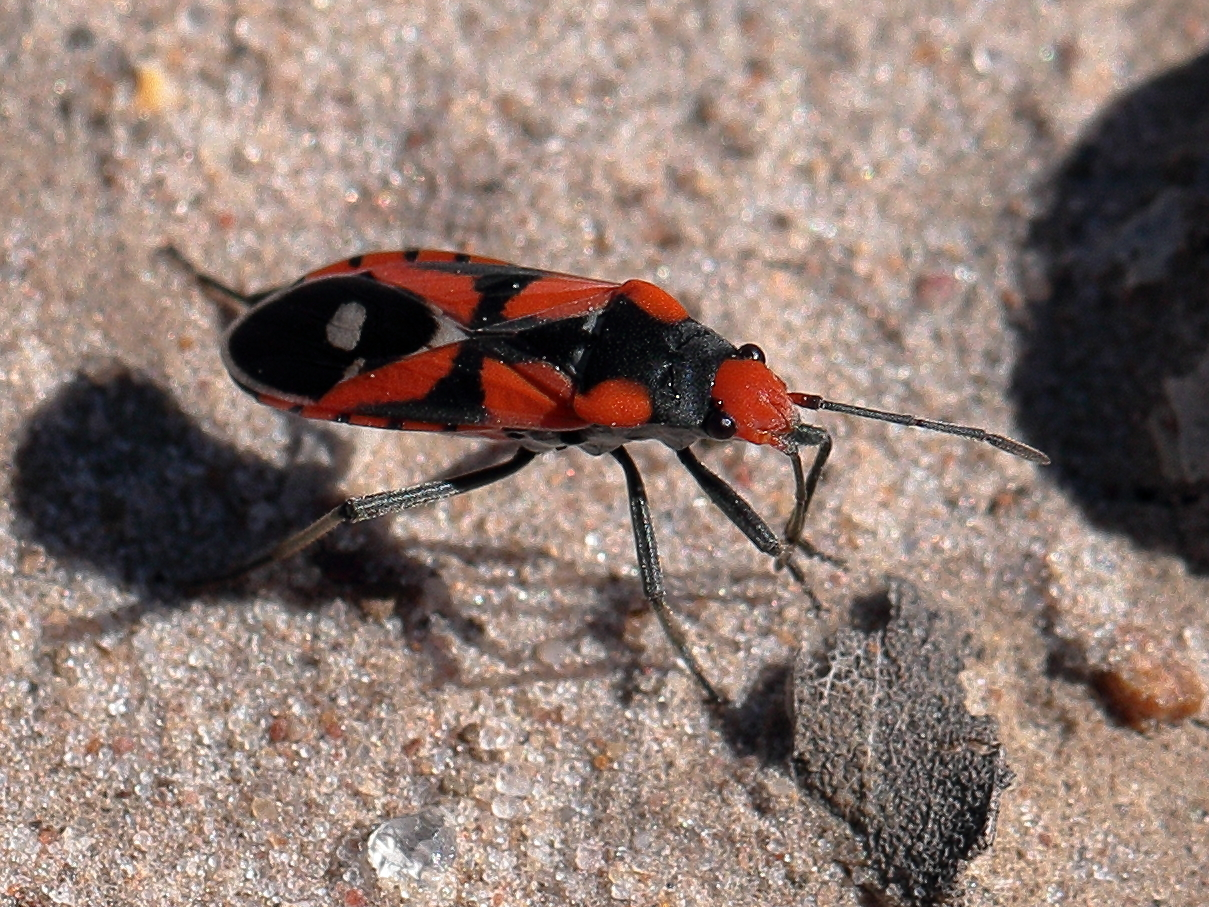
- In Australia

Scientific classification
- Domain: Eukaryota
- Kingdom: Animalia
- Phylum: Arthropoda
- Class: Insecta
- Order: Hemiptera
- Suborder: Heteroptera
- Family: Lygaeidae
- Subfamily: Lygaeinae
- Genus: Melanerythrus
- Species: M. mactans

Binomial name
- Melanerythrus mactans (Stål, 1867)

= Melanerythrus mactans =

Species of seed bug

Melanerythrus mactans is a species of seed bug in the family Lygaeidae, found in Australia and Pacific Islands.
