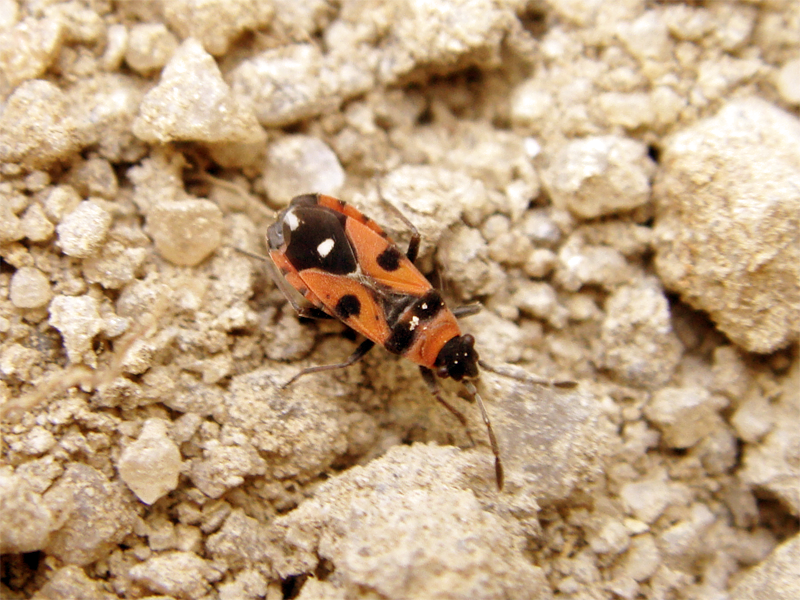
- Horvathiolus superbus, Portugal

Scientific classification
- Domain: Eukaryota
- Kingdom: Animalia
- Phylum: Arthropoda
- Class: Insecta
- Order: Hemiptera
- Suborder: Heteroptera
- Family: Lygaeidae
- Subfamily: Lygaeinae
- Genus: Horvathiolus
- Species: H. superbus

Binomial name
- Horvathiolus superbus (Pollich, 1783)

= Horvathiolus superbus =

Species of seed bug

Horvathiolus superbus is a species of seed bug in the family Lygaeidae, found in the Palearctic.

== Subspecies ==
These seven subspecies belong to the species Horvathiolus superbus:

- Horvathiolus superbus beieri (Wagner, 1956)
- Horvathiolus superbus confluens (Horvath, 1916)
- Horvathiolus superbus conjunctus (Mancini, 1952)
- Horvathiolus superbus erythropus (Horvath, 1916)
- Horvathiolus superbus kolenatii (Horvath, 1916)
- Horvathiolus superbus romanus (Stichel, 1957)
- Horvathiolus superbus superbus (Pollich, 1783)
