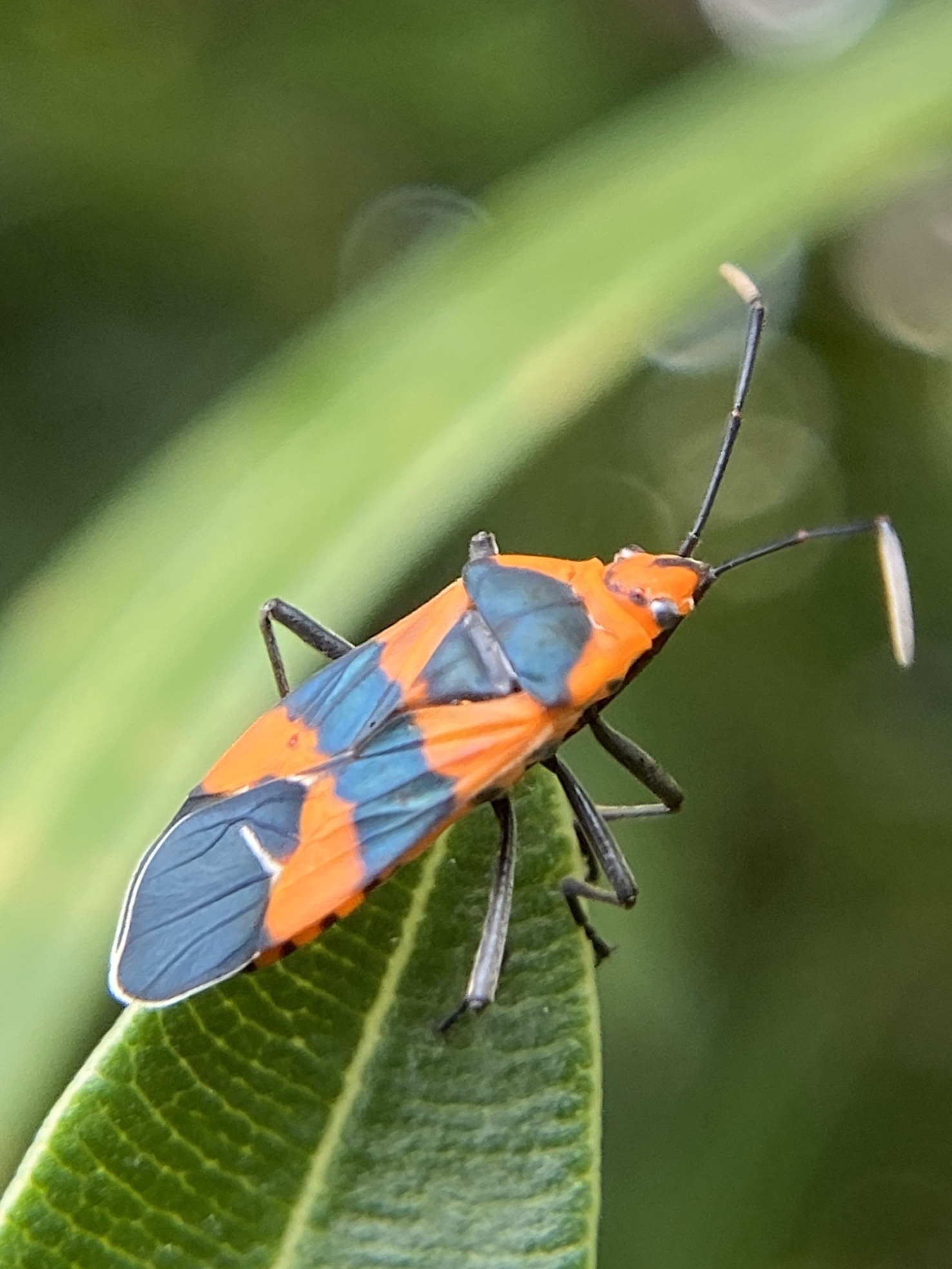

Scientific classification
- Domain: Eukaryota
- Kingdom: Animalia
- Phylum: Arthropoda
- Class: Insecta
- Order: Hemiptera
- Suborder: Heteroptera
- Family: Lygaeidae
- Subfamily: Lygaeinae
- Genus: Oncopeltus
- Species: O. aulicus

Binomial name
- Oncopeltus aulicus Fabricius, 1775

= Oncopeltus aulicus =

Species of seed bug

Oncopeltus aulicus is a species of seed bug in the family Lygaeidae, found in Florida and the Caribbean.
