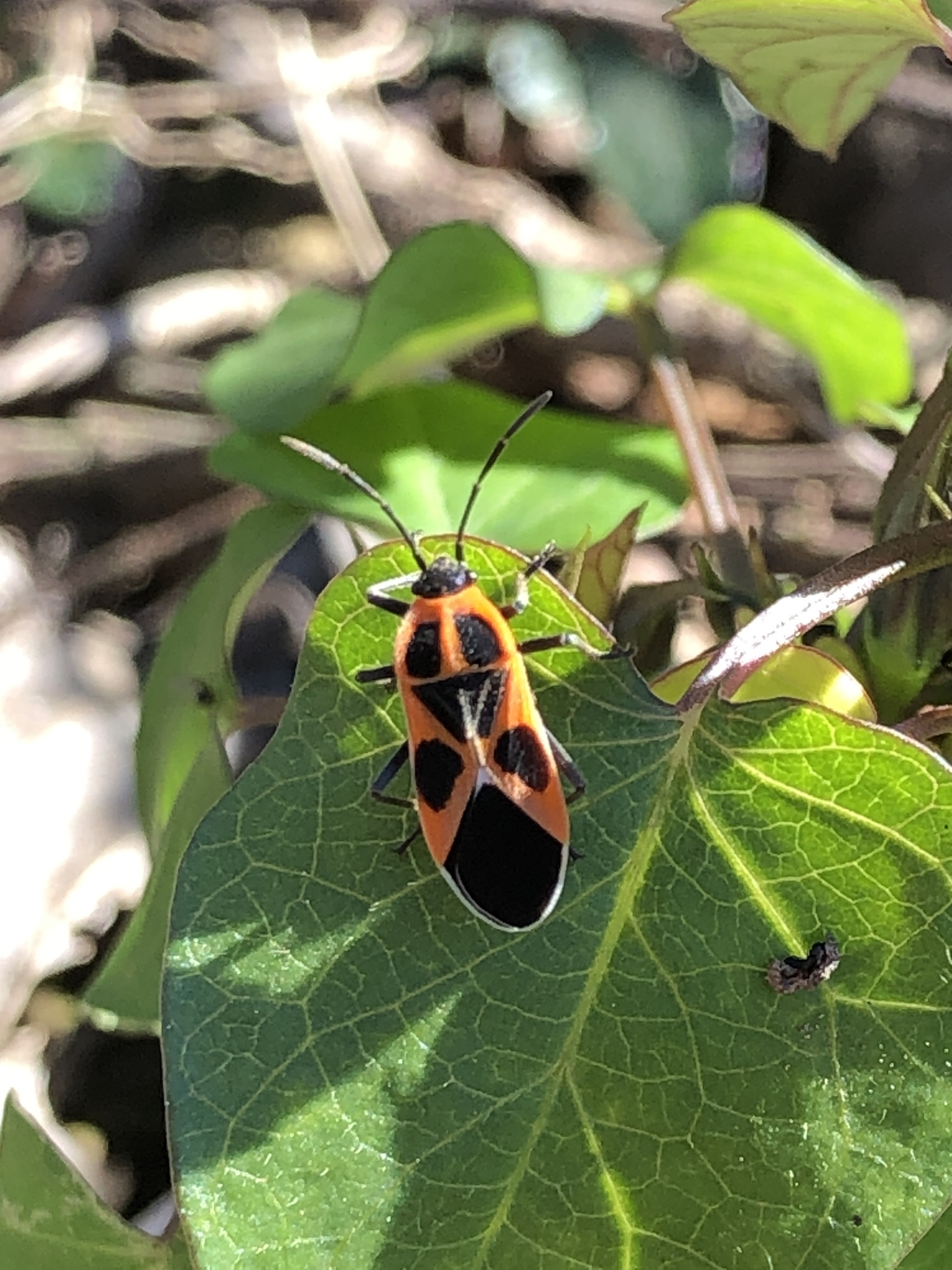
- Tropidothorax sinensis, South Korea

Scientific classification
- Domain: Eukaryota
- Kingdom: Animalia
- Phylum: Arthropoda
- Class: Insecta
- Order: Hemiptera
- Suborder: Heteroptera
- Family: Lygaeidae
- Subfamily: Lygaeinae
- Genus: Tropidothorax
- Species: T. sinensis

Binomial name
- Tropidothorax sinensis (Reuter, 1888)

= Tropidothorax sinensis =

Species of true bug

Tropidothorax sinensis is a species of seed bug in the family Lygaeidae, found in eastern Asia.
