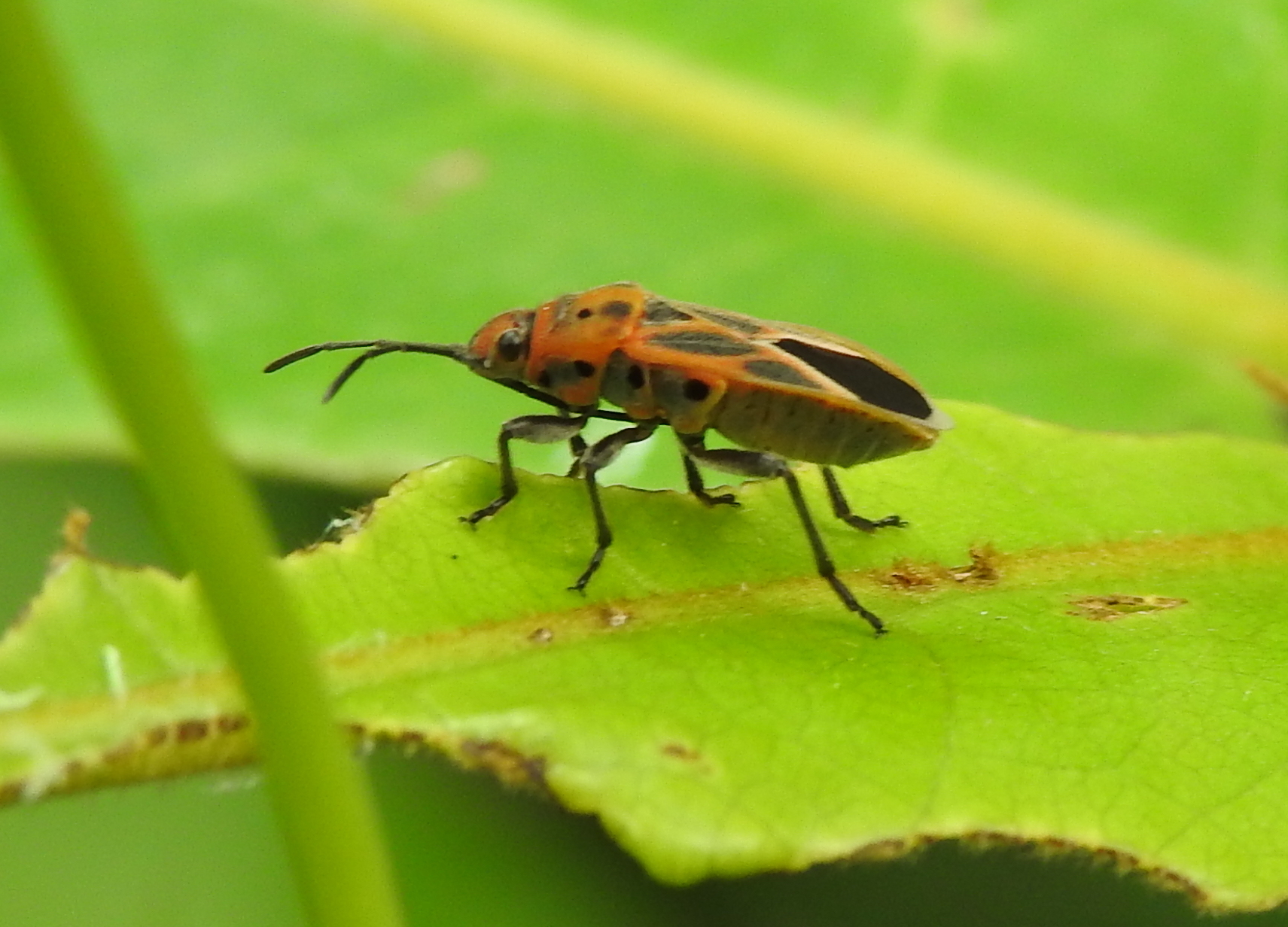
- Graptostethus servus, Malaysia

Scientific classification
- Kingdom: Animalia
- Phylum: Arthropoda
- Class: Insecta
- Order: Hemiptera
- Suborder: Heteroptera
- Family: Lygaeidae
- Subfamily: Lygaeinae
- Genus: Graptostethus
- Species: G. servus

Binomial name
- Graptostethus servus Fabricius, 1787

= Graptostethus servus =

Species of seed bug

Graptostethus servus is a species of seed bug in the family Lygaeidae. It is found in Europe, Asia, Australia, and in the Pacific region. Larvae are grey and are prey items for chickens.

== Subspecies ==
These six subspecies belong to the species Graptostethus servus:

- Graptostethus servus conjunctus Stichel, 1958
- Graptostethus servus insularis Stichel, 1958
- Graptostethus servus maculicollis (Herrich-Schaeffer, 1850)
- Graptostethus servus pacificus Stichel, 1958
- Graptostethus servus servus (Fabricius, 1787)
- Graptostethus servus stali Stichel, 1958
