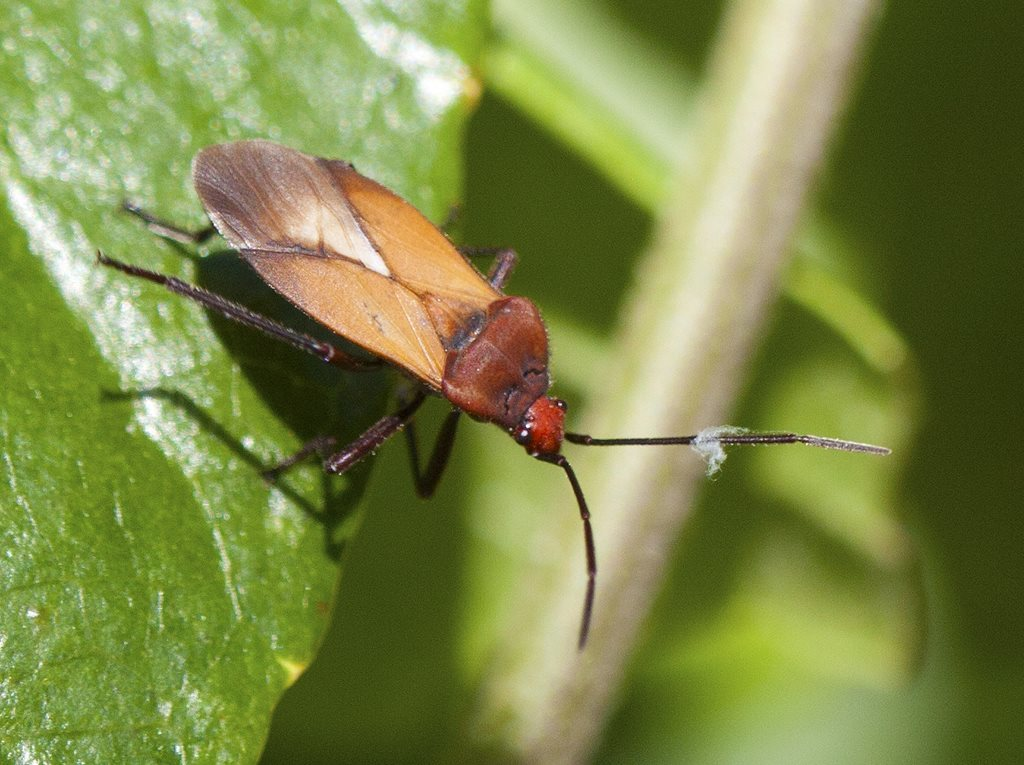
- Oncopeltus sordidus, Australia

Scientific classification
- Domain: Eukaryota
- Kingdom: Animalia
- Phylum: Arthropoda
- Class: Insecta
- Order: Hemiptera
- Suborder: Heteroptera
- Family: Lygaeidae
- Subfamily: Lygaeinae
- Genus: Oncopeltus
- Species: O. sordidus

Binomial name
- Oncopeltus sordidus (Dallas, 1852)

= Oncopeltus sordidus =

Species of true bug

Oncopeltus sordidus is a species of seed bug in the family Lygaeidae, found in Australia.
