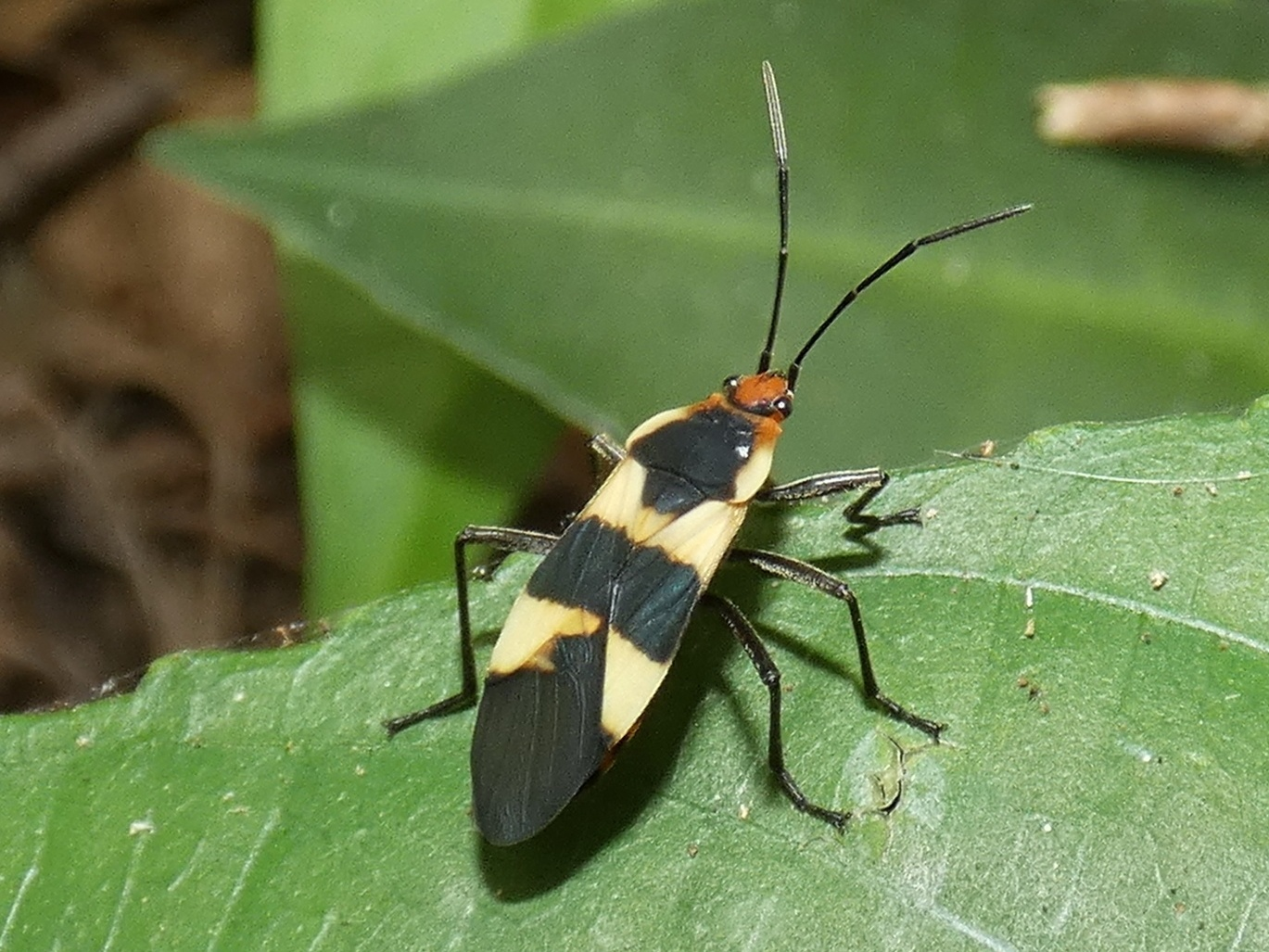

Scientific classification
- Kingdom: Animalia
- Phylum: Arthropoda
- Clade: Pancrustacea
- Class: Insecta
- Order: Hemiptera
- Suborder: Heteroptera
- Family: Lygaeidae
- Subfamily: Lygaeinae
- Genus: Oncopeltus
- Species: O. sandarachatus

Binomial name
- Oncopeltus sandarachatus (Say, 1831)

= Oncopeltus sandarachatus =

Species of seed bug

Oncopeltus sandarachatus is a species of seed bug in the family Lygaeidae, found in North, Central, and South America.
