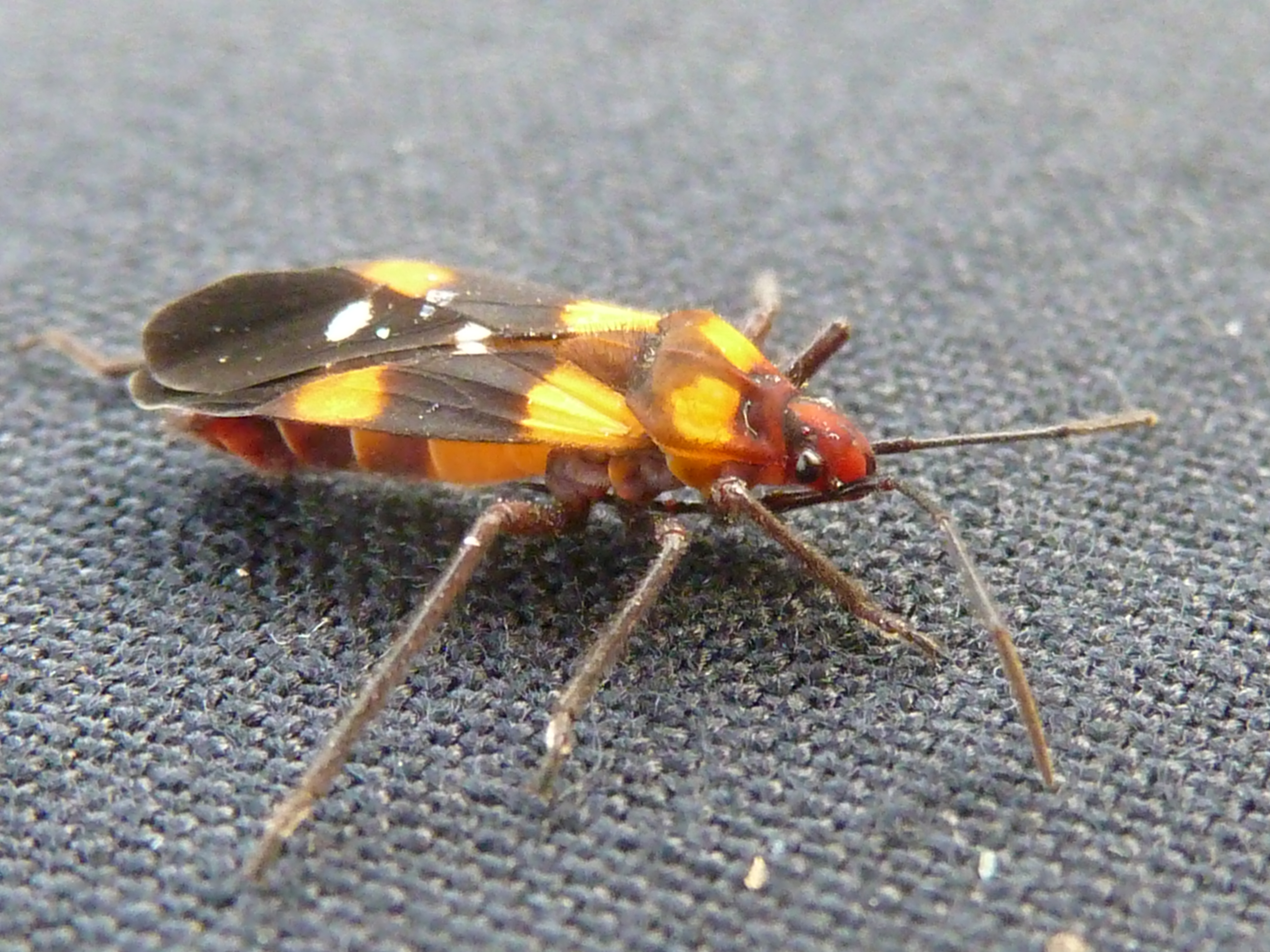
- Oncopeltus famelicus, South Africa

Scientific classification
- Domain: Eukaryota
- Kingdom: Animalia
- Phylum: Arthropoda
- Class: Insecta
- Order: Hemiptera
- Suborder: Heteroptera
- Family: Lygaeidae
- Subfamily: Lygaeinae
- Genus: Oncopeltus
- Species: O. famelicus

Binomial name
- Oncopeltus famelicus (Fabricius, 1781)

= Oncopeltus famelicus =

Species of seed bug

Oncopeltus famelicus is a species of seed bug in the family Lygaeidae, found in sub-Saharan Africa.

== Subspecies ==
These two subspecies belong to the species Oncopeltus famelicus:

- Oncopeltus famelicus famelicus (Fabricius, 1781)
- Oncopeltus famelicus jucundus (Dallas, 1852)
