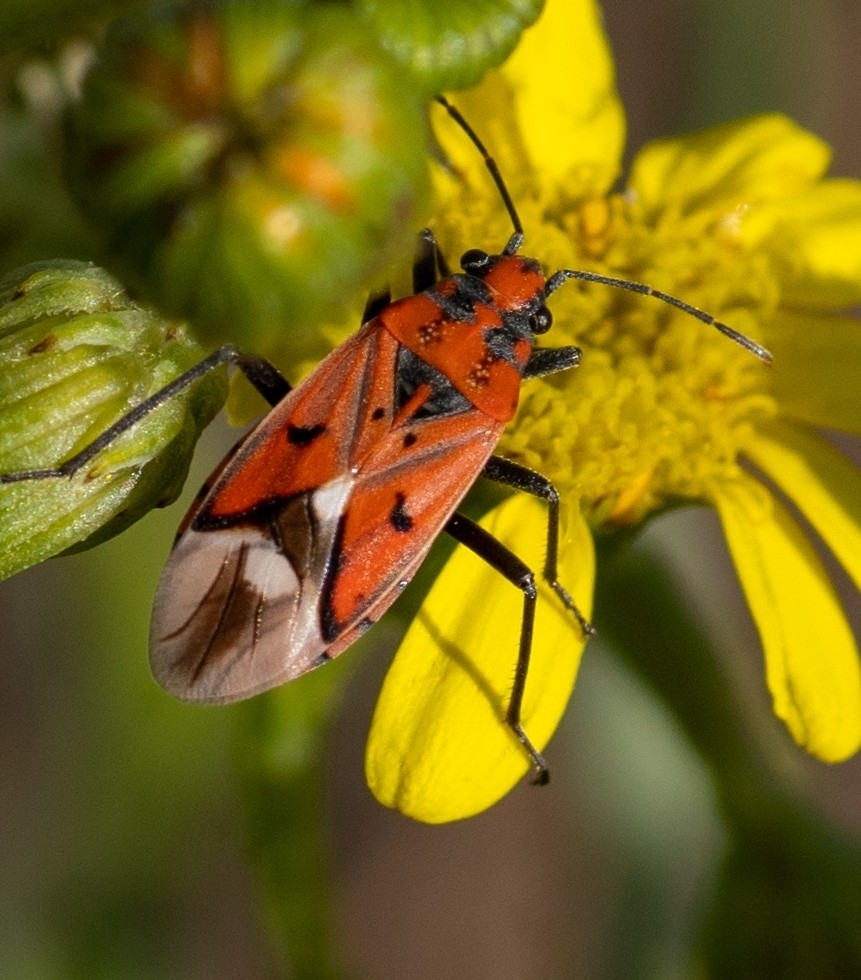
- Haemobaphus concinnus, South Africa

Scientific classification
- Kingdom: Animalia
- Phylum: Arthropoda
- Class: Insecta
- Order: Hemiptera
- Suborder: Heteroptera
- Family: Lygaeidae
- Subfamily: Lygaeinae
- Genus: Haemobaphus
- Species: H. concinnus

Binomial name
- Haemobaphus concinnus (Dallas, 1852)

= Haemobaphus concinnus =

Species of true bug

Haemobaphus concinnus is a species of seed bug in the family Lygaeidae, found in southern Africa.
