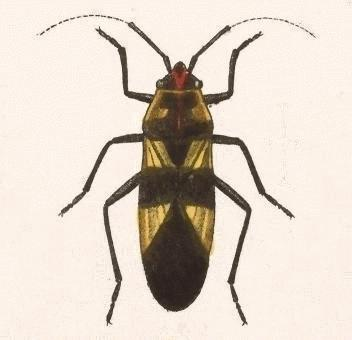
- Oncopeltus cingulifer

Scientific classification
- Domain: Eukaryota
- Kingdom: Animalia
- Phylum: Arthropoda
- Class: Insecta
- Order: Hemiptera
- Suborder: Heteroptera
- Family: Lygaeidae
- Subfamily: Lygaeinae
- Genus: Oncopeltus
- Species: O. cingulifer

Binomial name
- Oncopeltus cingulifer Stål, 1874

= Oncopeltus cingulifer =

Species of seed bug

Oncopeltus cingulifer is a species of seed bug in the family Lygaeidae. It is found in North, Central, and South America.
