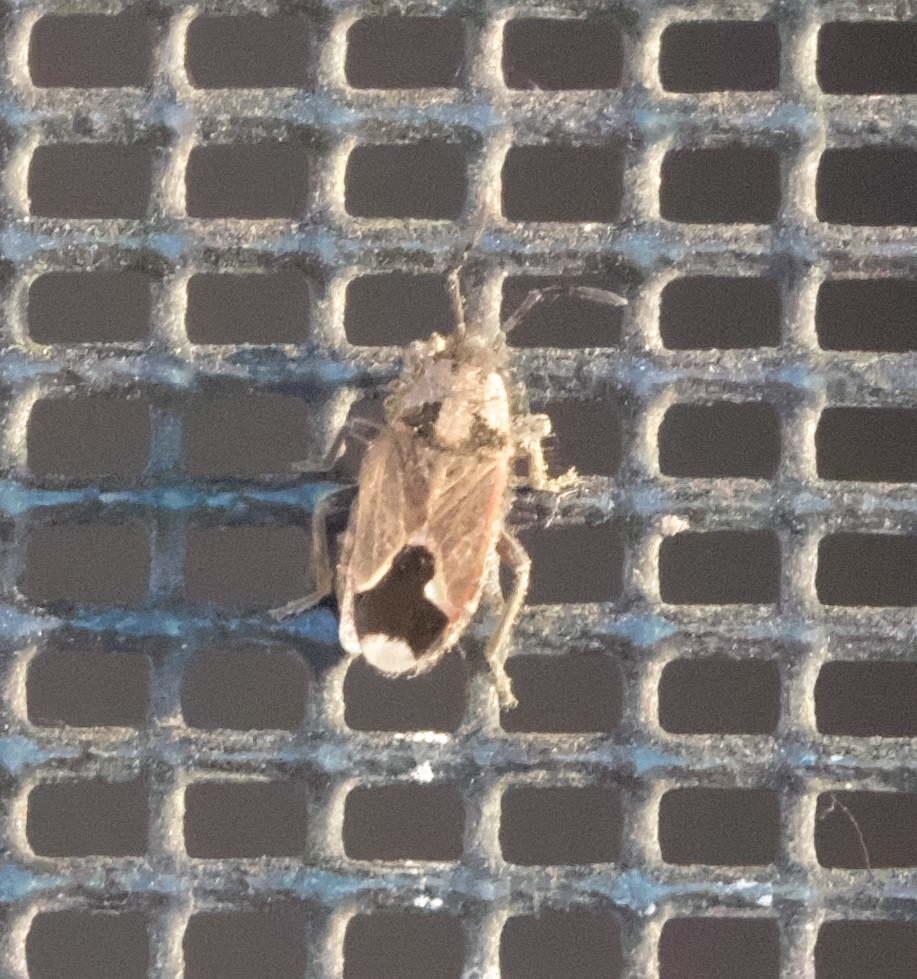
- Melanotelus villosulus, Botswana

Scientific classification
- Kingdom: Animalia
- Phylum: Arthropoda
- Clade: Pancrustacea
- Class: Insecta
- Order: Hemiptera
- Suborder: Heteroptera
- Family: Lygaeidae
- Subfamily: Lygaeinae
- Genus: Melanotelus
- Species: M. villosulus

Binomial name
- Melanotelus villosulus (Stål, 1855)

Synonyms
- Lygaeosoma villosulus (Stal, 1855); Lygaeus villosulus Stal, 1855

= Melanotelus villosulus =

Species of true bugs

Melanotelus villosulus is a species of seed bug in the family Lygaeidae, found in Africa, southern Europe, and southern Asia.
