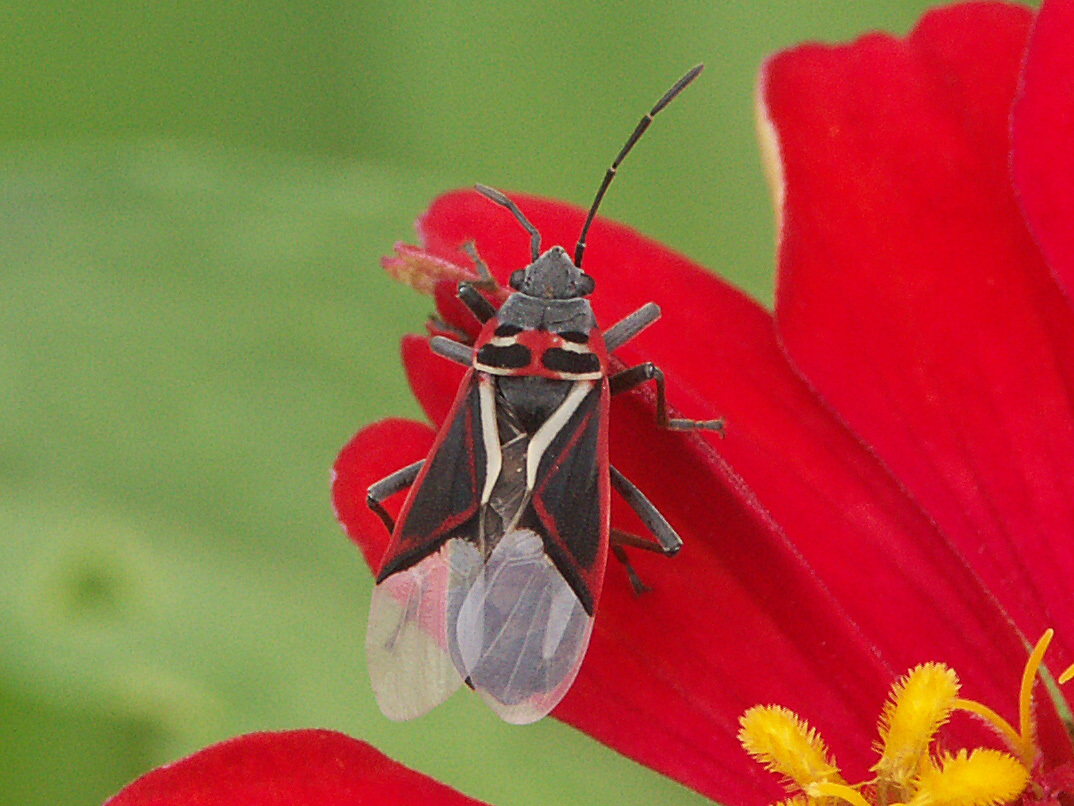
- Anochrostomus formosus, Brasil

Scientific classification
- Domain: Eukaryota
- Kingdom: Animalia
- Phylum: Arthropoda
- Class: Insecta
- Order: Hemiptera
- Suborder: Heteroptera
- Family: Lygaeidae
- Subfamily: Lygaeinae
- Genus: Anochrostomus
- Species: A. formosus

Binomial name
- Anochrostomus formosus (Blanchard, 1840)

= Anochrostomus formosus =

Species of seed bug

Anochrostomus formosus is a species of seed bug in the family Lygaeidae. It is found in southern North America, Central America, and South America.
