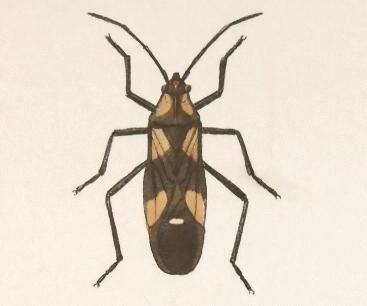

Scientific classification
- Domain: Eukaryota
- Kingdom: Animalia
- Phylum: Arthropoda
- Class: Insecta
- Order: Hemiptera
- Suborder: Heteroptera
- Family: Lygaeidae
- Genus: Oncopeltus
- Species: O. sexmaculatus

Binomial name
- Oncopeltus sexmaculatus Stal, 1874

= Oncopeltus sexmaculatus =

Species of true bug

Oncopeltus sexmaculatus, the six-spotted milkweed bug, is a species of seed bug in the family Lygaeidae. It is found on islands in the Caribbean Sea, Central America, and North America.
