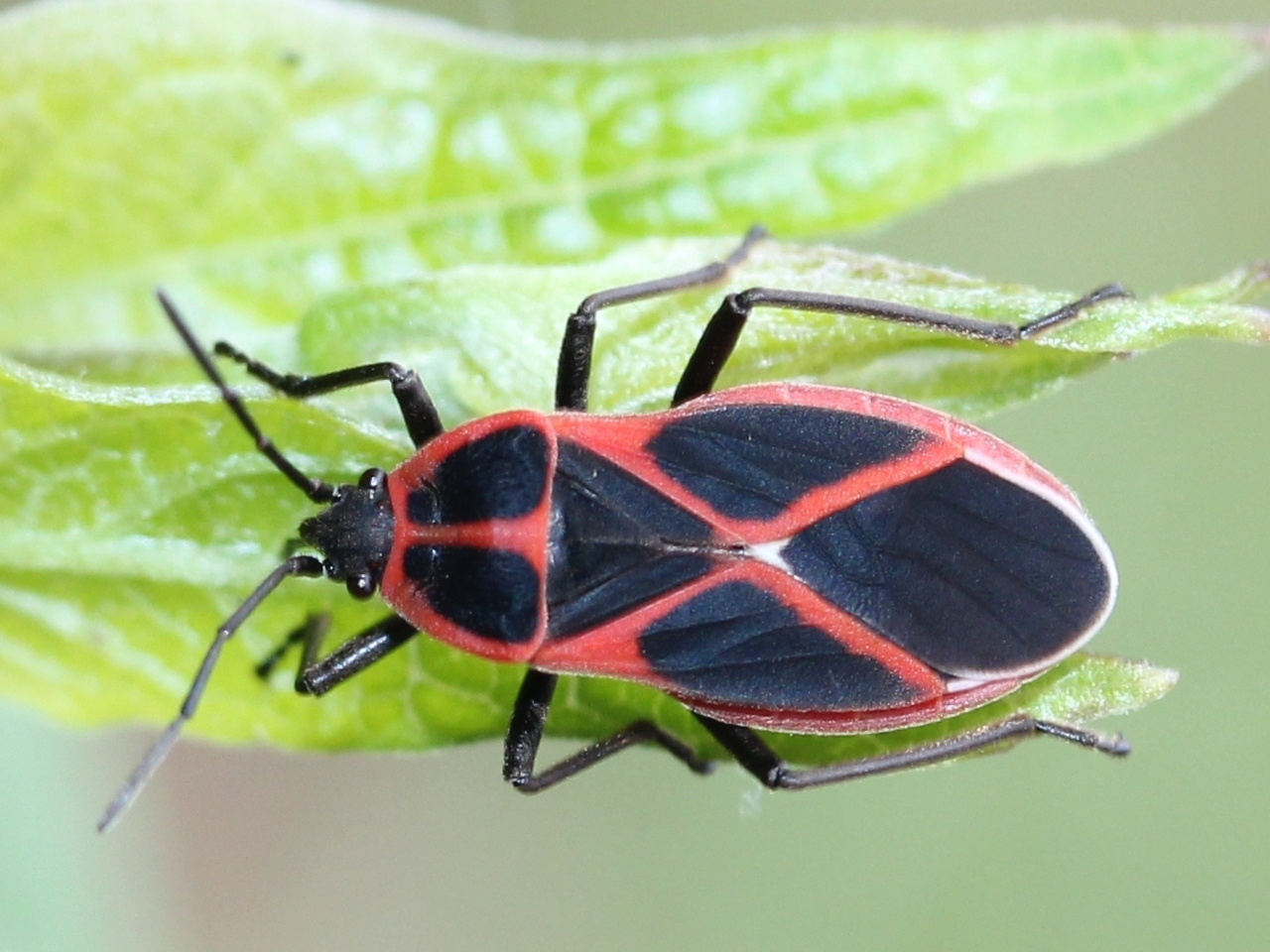
- Tropidothorax cruciger

Scientific classification
- Kingdom: Animalia
- Phylum: Arthropoda
- Class: Insecta
- Order: Hemiptera
- Suborder: Heteroptera
- Family: Lygaeidae
- Subfamily: Lygaeinae
- Genus: Tropidothorax; Bergroth, 1894

= Tropidothorax =

Genus of true bugs

Tropidothorax is a genus of seed bugs or ground bugs belonging to the family Lygaeidae, subfamily Lygaeinae. There are about 11 described species in Tropidothorax.

== Species ==
These species belong to the genus Tropidothorax:

Tropidothorax autolycus (Distant, 1904)
Tropidothorax cruciger (Motschulsky, 1859)
Tropidothorax elegans (Distant, 1883)
Tropidothorax fimbriatus (Dallas, 1852)
Tropidothorax leucopterus (Goeze, 1778)
Tropidothorax maculatus (Dallas, 1852)
Tropidothorax neocaledonicus Bergroth, 1909
Tropidothorax sinensis (Reuter, 1888)
Tropidothorax sternalis (Dallas, 1852)
Tropidothorax villersi Slater & Wilcox, 1973
Tropidothorax wittmeri Hamid & Hamid, 1985
