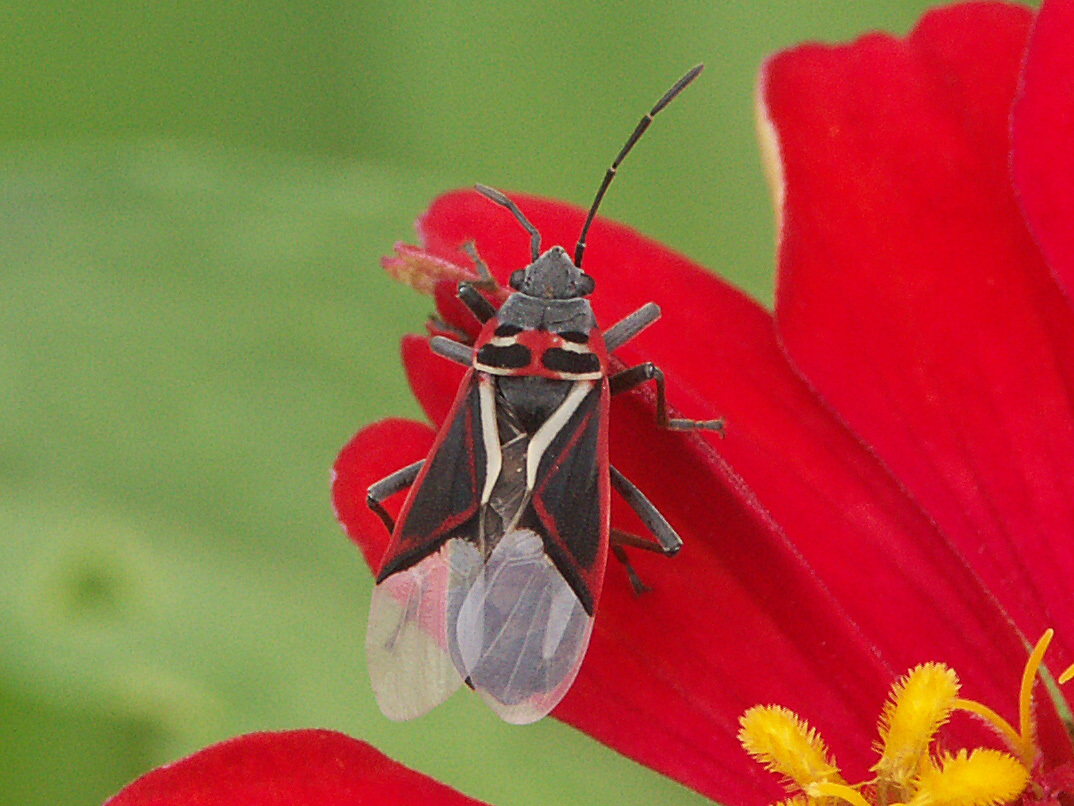
- Anochrostomus formosus, Brasil

Scientific classification
- Domain: Eukaryota
- Kingdom: Animalia
- Phylum: Arthropoda
- Class: Insecta
- Order: Hemiptera
- Suborder: Heteroptera
- Family: Lygaeidae
- Subfamily: Lygaeinae
- Genus: Anochrostomus; Slater Alex, 1992

= Anochrostomus =

Genus of insects

Anochrostomus is a genus of seed bugs in the family Lygaeidae. There are at least two described species in Anochrostomus.

== Species ==
These two species belong to the genus Anochrostomus:

- Anochrostomus formosoides Baranowski, 2005
- Anochrostomus formosus (Blanchard, 1840)
