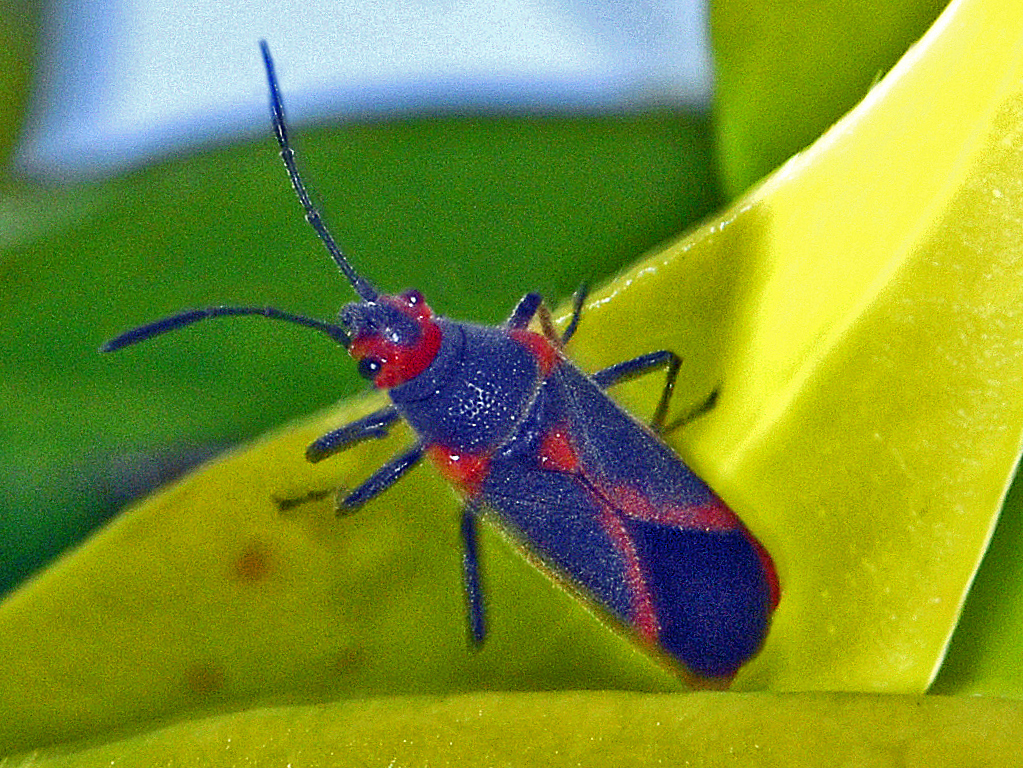
- Caenocoris nerii

Scientific classification
- Domain: Eukaryota
- Kingdom: Animalia
- Phylum: Arthropoda
- Class: Insecta
- Order: Hemiptera
- Suborder: Heteroptera
- Family: Lygaeidae
- Subfamily: Lygaeinae
- Genus: Caenocoris; Fieber, 1860

= Caenocoris =

Genus of true bugs

Caenocoris is a genus of ground bugs in the insect family Lygaeidae.

== Species ==
Species within this genus include:

- Caenocoris botoltobagensis Esaki, 1931
- Caenocoris croceosignatus Breddin, 1901
- Caenocoris fuscipennis (Guerin, 1838)
- Caenocoris nerii (Germar, 1847) - oleander bug
- Caenocoris pilosulus (Germar, 1837)
- Caenocoris simillimus Horvath, 1924
