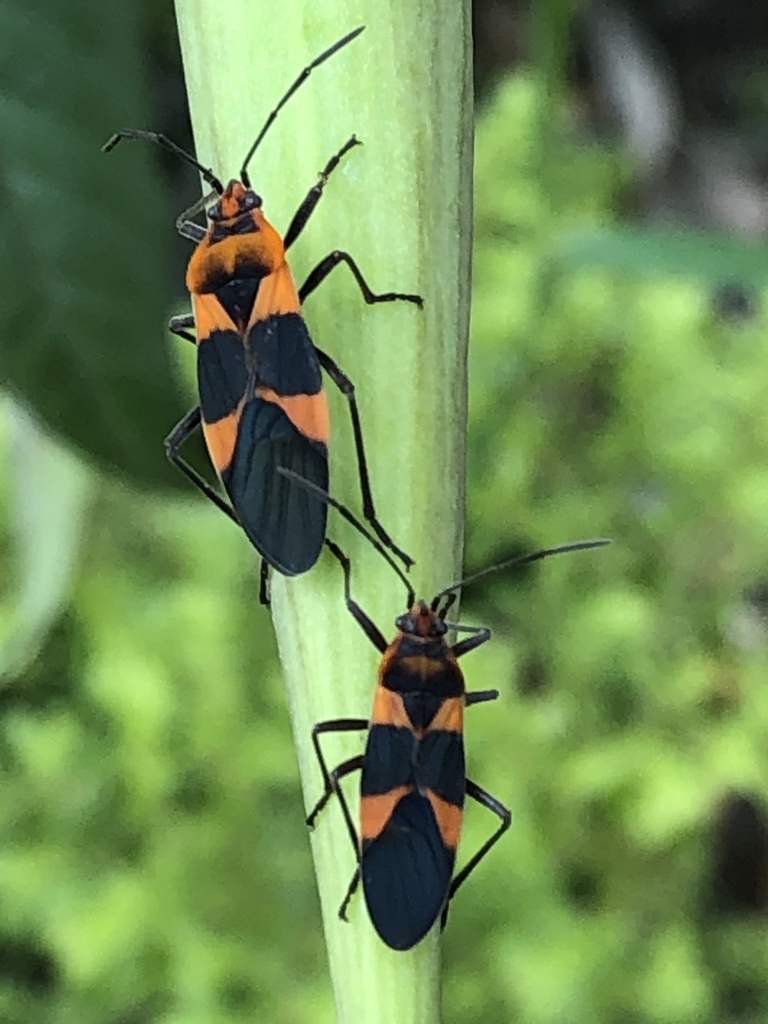

Scientific classification
- Domain: Eukaryota
- Kingdom: Animalia
- Phylum: Arthropoda
- Class: Insecta
- Order: Hemiptera
- Suborder: Heteroptera
- Family: Lygaeidae
- Genus: Oncopeltus
- Species: O. zonatus

Binomial name
- Oncopeltus zonatus (Erichson, 1848)

Synonyms
- Lygaeus zonatus Erichson, 1848

= Oncopeltus zonatus =

Species of seed bug

Oncopeltus zonatus is a species of seed bug in the family Lygaeidae, found in the Neotropics in Guiana, Peru, and Chile. Oncopeltus zonatus is a terrestrial species. Its known host plants are Asclepias curassavica, Funastrum clausum, and Nerium oleander.
