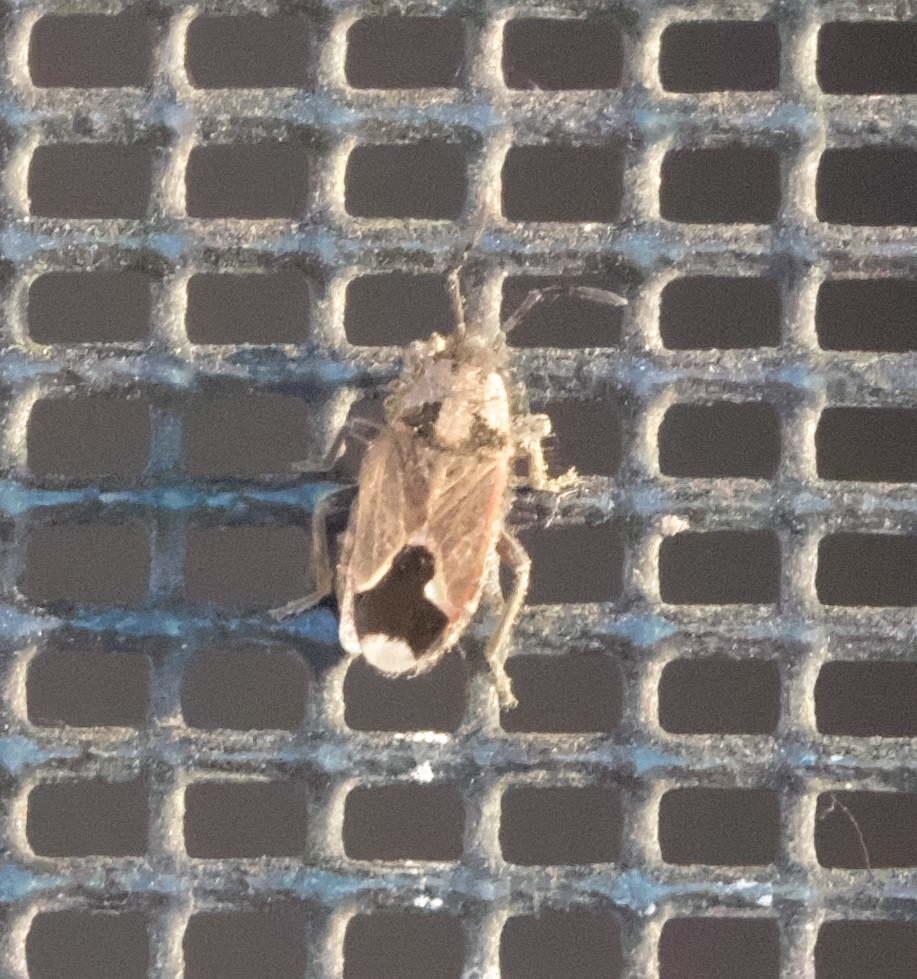
- Melanotelus villosulus, Botswana

Scientific classification
- Kingdom: Animalia
- Phylum: Arthropoda
- Class: Insecta
- Order: Hemiptera
- Suborder: Heteroptera
- Family: Lygaeidae
- Subfamily: Lygaeinae
- Genus: Melanotelus; Reuter, 1885

= Melanotelus =

Genus of true bugs

Melanotelus is a genus of seed bugs in the family Lygaeidae. There are about six described species in Melanotelus.

== Species ==
These six species belong to the genus Melanotelus:

- Melanotelus argillaceus Reuter, 1885
- Melanotelus bipunctatus (Dallas, 1852)
- Melanotelus geriae Slater Alex, 1985
- Melanotelus timorensis Distant, 1903
- Melanotelus villiersi Hoberlandt, 1954
- Melanotelus villosulus (Stål, 1855)
