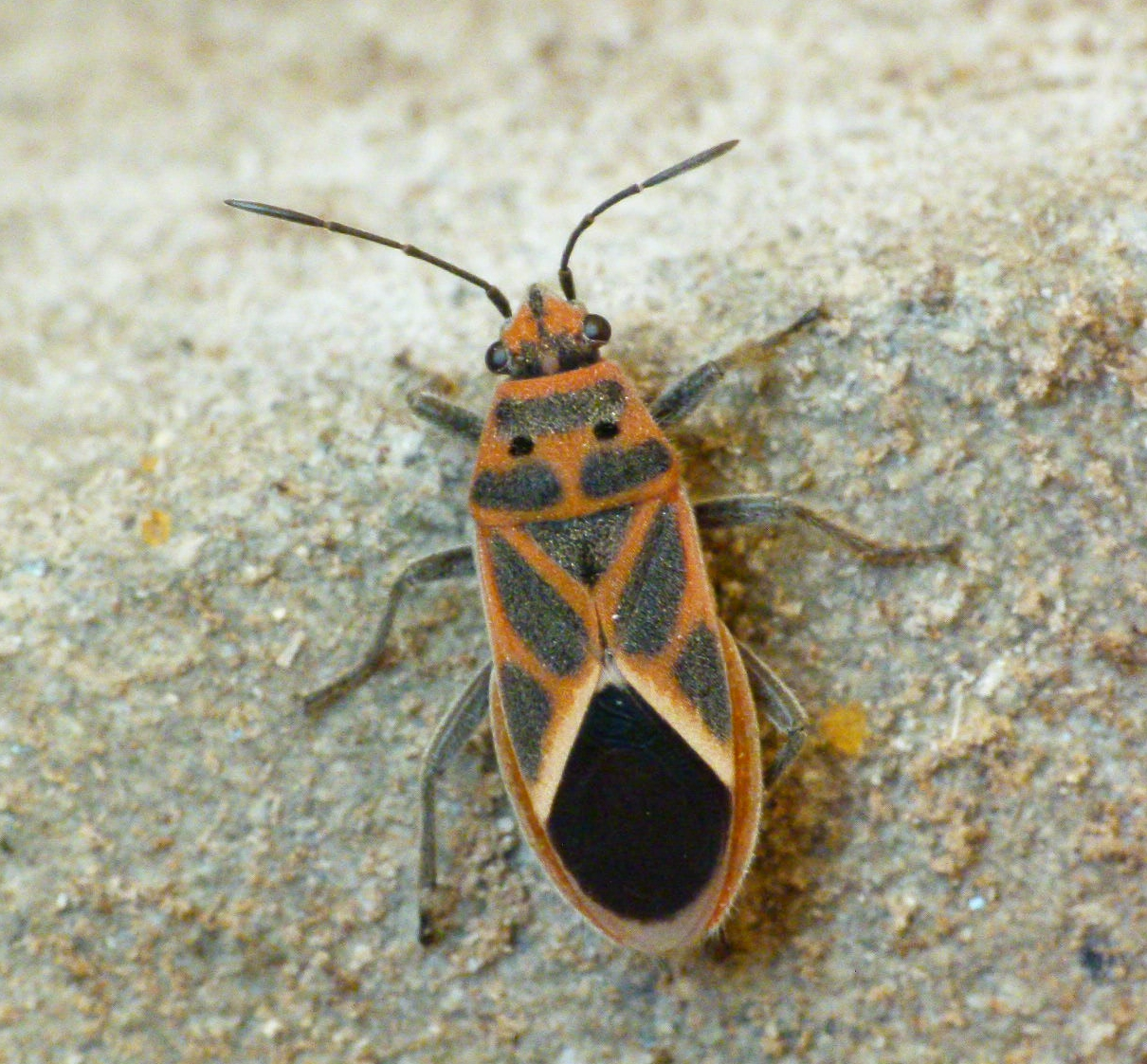
- Graptostethus cf. servus

Scientific classification
- Kingdom: Animalia
- Phylum: Arthropoda
- Clade: Pancrustacea
- Class: Insecta
- Order: Hemiptera
- Suborder: Heteroptera
- Family: Lygaeidae
- Subfamily: Lygaeinae
- Genus: Graptostethus; Stål, 1868

= Graptostethus =

Genus of true bugs

Graptostethus is a genus in the insect family Lygaeidae (seed bugs). Although originally restricted to the Old World (Palaearctic, Ethiopian, and Oriental Regions) some species like G. servus have spread to parts of the New World.

Species in the genus include:

Graptostethus apicalis (Dallas, 1852)
Graptostethus argentatus (Fabricius, 1803)
Graptostethus cardinalis (Stal, 1867)
Graptostethus carpenteri Distant, 1918
Graptostethus dissidens Montandon, 1893
Graptostethus distanti Reuter, 1887
Graptostethus electus Distant, 1918
Graptostethus flammatus Distant, 1918
Graptostethus grandis Distant, 1901
Graptostethus guigliai Mancini, 1953
Graptostethus imperialis Mancini, 1939
Graptostethus incertus (Walker, 1872)
Graptostethus incomptus (Herrich-Schaeffer, 1850)
Graptostethus izzardi Slater, 1964
Graptostethus nigriceps Stal, 1874
Graptostethus ocellatus (Montrouzier, 1865)
Graptostethus parvinotatus Distant, 1918
Graptostethus pubescens Slater Alex, 1985
Graptostethus quadrisignatus Distant, 1879
Graptostethus rufifemoratus (Dallas, 1852)
Graptostethus rufus Distant, 1918
Graptostethus septus (Germar, 1837)
Graptostethus servus Fabricius, 1787
Graptostethus sternalis (Distant, 1918)
Graptostethus swynnertoni (Distant, 1915)
Graptostethus varipictus Slater Alex, 1985
Graptostethus verticalis (Dallas, 1852)
