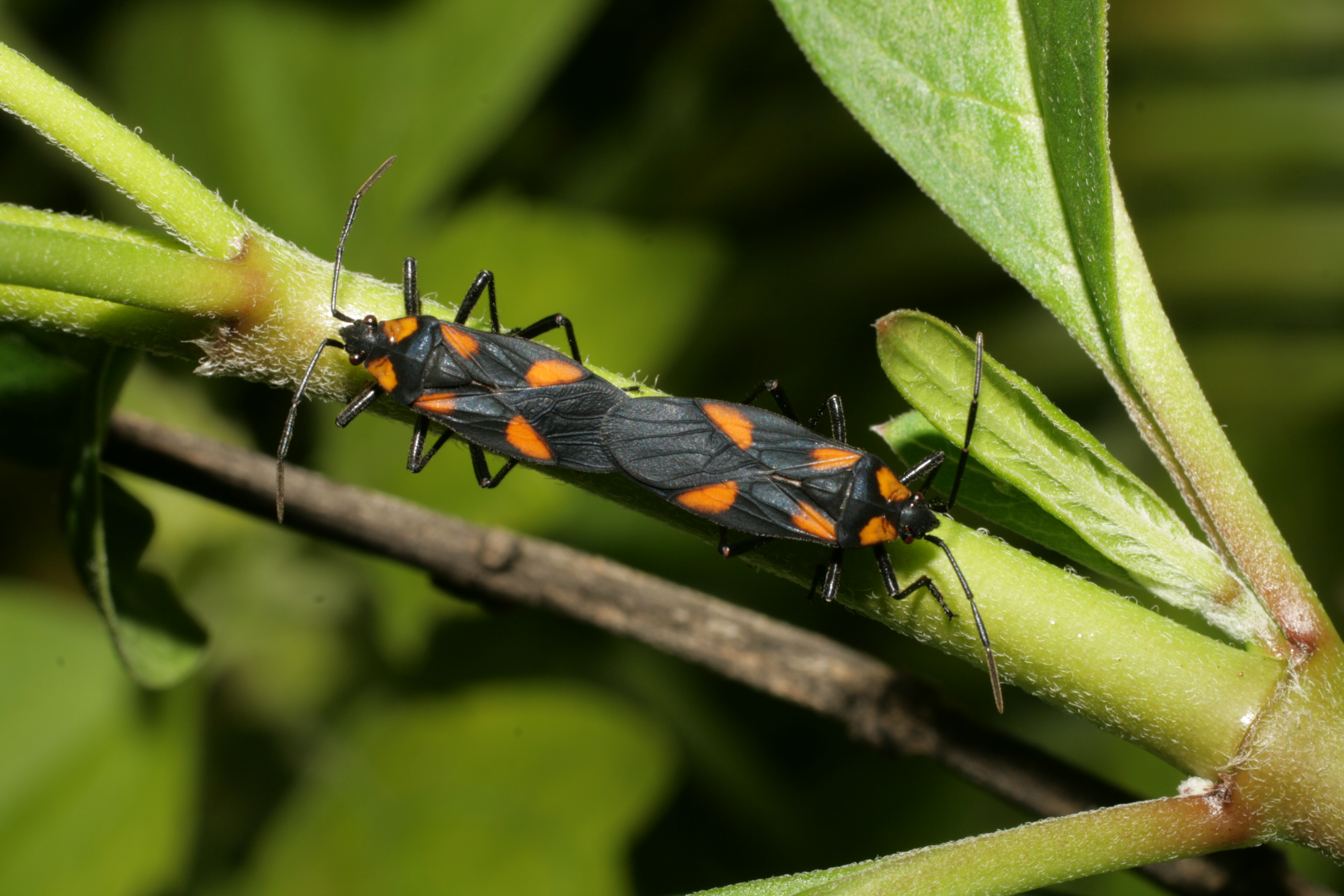

Scientific classification
- Domain: Eukaryota
- Kingdom: Animalia
- Phylum: Arthropoda
- Class: Insecta
- Order: Hemiptera
- Suborder: Heteroptera
- Family: Lygaeidae
- Genus: Oncopeltus
- Species: O. cayensis

Binomial name
- Oncopeltus cayensis Torre-Bueno, 1944

= Oncopeltus cayensis =

Species of true bug

Oncopeltus cayensis is a species of seed bug in the family Lygaeidae. It is found in the Caribbean Sea and North America.
