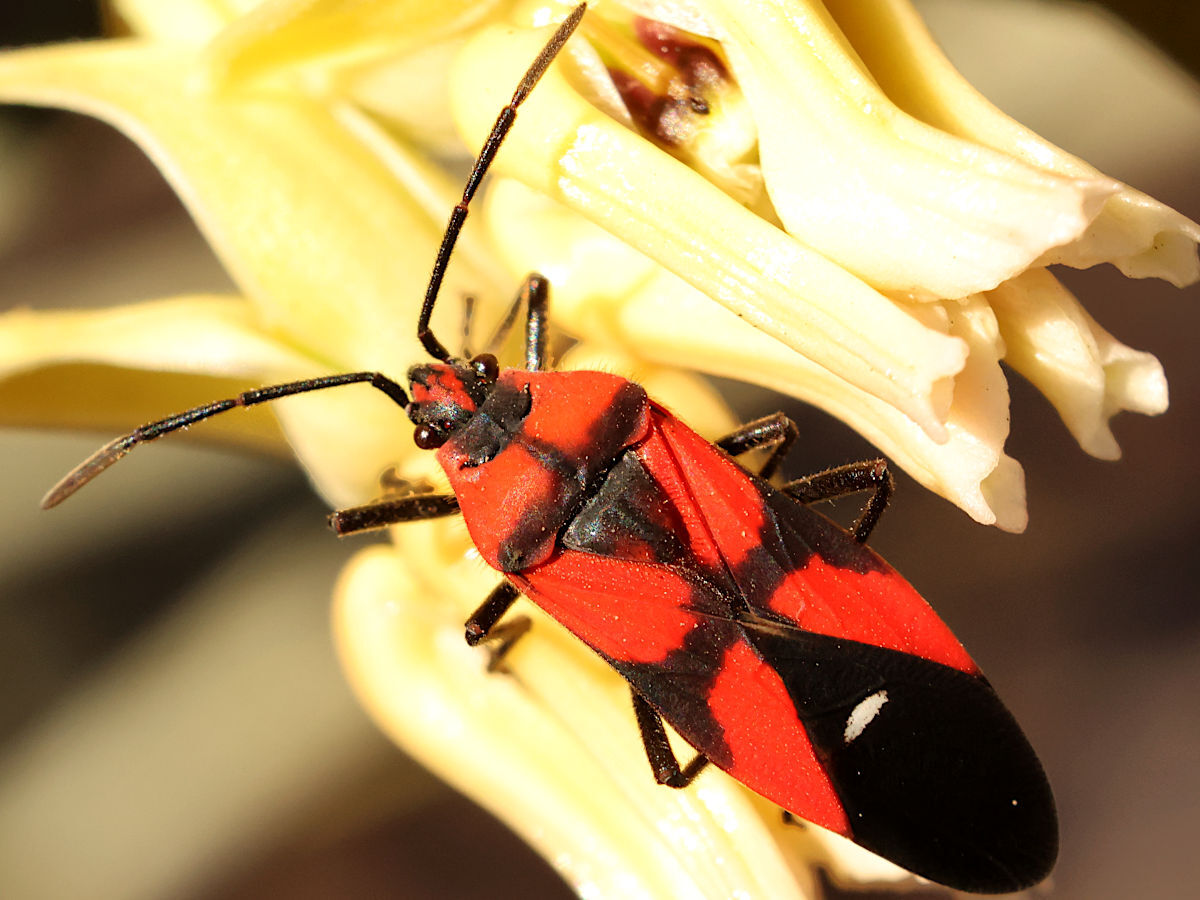
- dorsal view
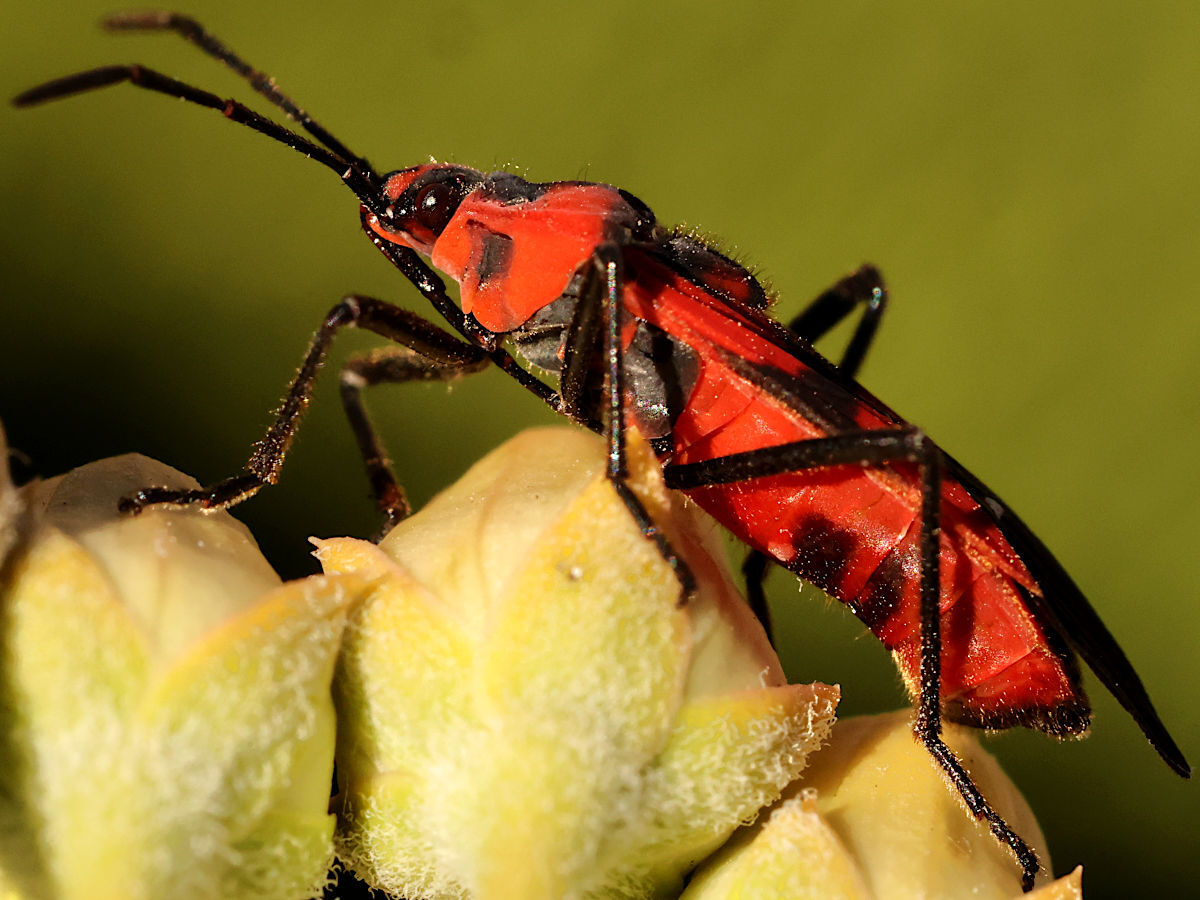
- profile view

Scientific classification
- Kingdom: Animalia
- Phylum: Arthropoda
- Class: Insecta
- Order: Hemiptera
- Suborder: Heteroptera
- Family: Lygaeidae
- Genus: Oncopeltus
- Species: O. sanguinolentus

Binomial name
- Oncopeltus sanguinolentus Van Duzee, 1914

Synonyms
- Oncopeltus sanguineolentus Van Duzee, 1914

= Oncopeltus sanguinolentus =

Species of true bug

Oncopeltus sanguinolentus, the blood-colored milkweed bug, is a species of seed bug in the family Lygaeidae. It is found in Central America and North America. Like several other members in the genus Oncopeltus, it preferentially feeds on milkweed plants, particularly Asclepias subulata.
