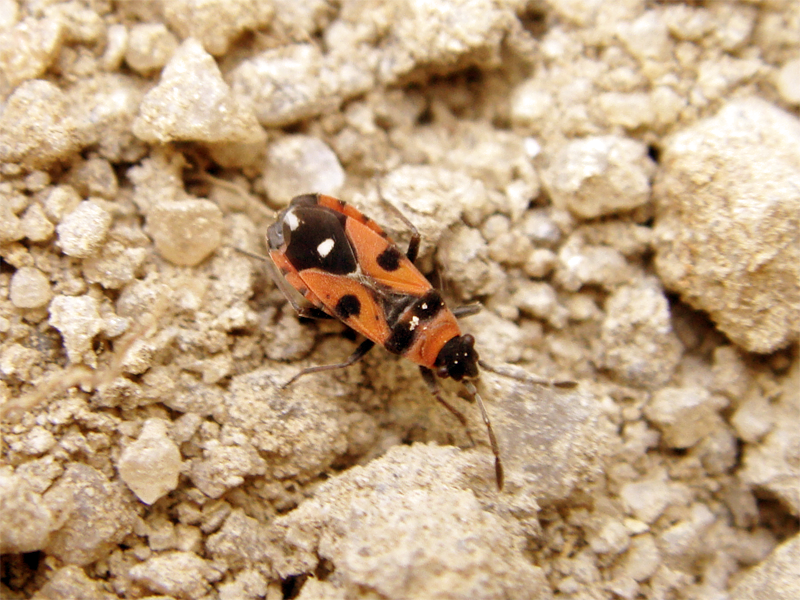
- Horvathiolus superbus

Scientific classification
- Kingdom: Animalia
- Phylum: Arthropoda
- Class: Insecta
- Order: Hemiptera
- Suborder: Heteroptera
- Family: Lygaeidae
- Subfamily: Lygaeinae
- Genus: Horvathiolus; Josifov, 1965

= Horvathiolus =

Genus of seed bugs

Horvathiolus is a genus of seed bugs in the family Lygaeidae. There are at least 20 described species in Horvathiolus.

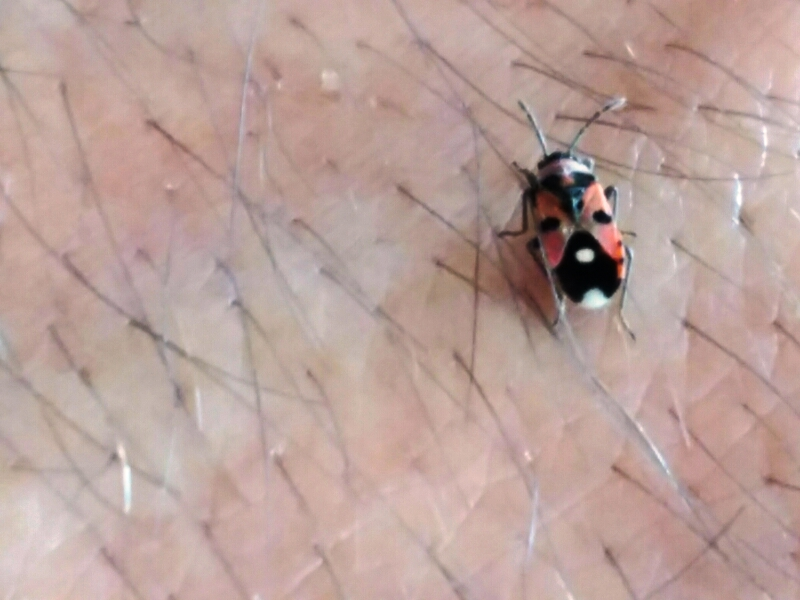
Horvathiolus syriacus

== Species ==
These 20 species belong to the genus Horvathiolus:

- Horvathiolus adonis Linnavuori, 1978
- Horvathiolus albomaculus (Lindberg, 1960)
- Horvathiolus amoenulus (Gerstaecker, 1873)
- Horvathiolus canariensis (Wagner, 1954)
- Horvathiolus contaminatus Linnavuori, 1978
- Horvathiolus delicatulus (Stal, 1855)
- Horvathiolus fulvescens (Puton, 1874)
- Horvathiolus gibbicollis (Costa, 1882)
- Horvathiolus guttatus (Rambur, 1839)
- Horvathiolus heydeni (Puton, 1892)
- Horvathiolus kiritshenkoi Josifov, 1965
- Horvathiolus longipilosus Slater & Sperry, 1973
- Horvathiolus mendosus (Horvath, 1916)
- Horvathiolus najranus Linnavuori, 1978
- Horvathiolus obscurus Linnavuori, 1978
- Horvathiolus rex Slater & Sperry, 1973
- Horvathiolus rhea Linnavuori, 1993
- Horvathiolus sudd Linnavuori, 1978
- Horvathiolus superbus (Pollich, 1783)
- Horvathiolus syriacus (Reuter, 1885)
