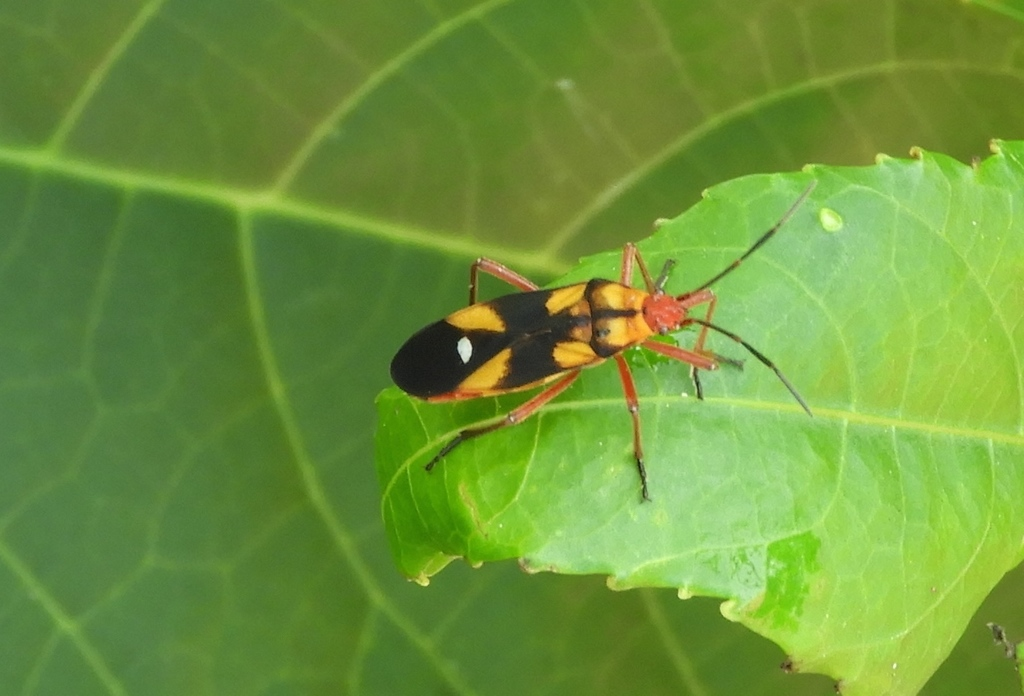
- Oncopeltus guttaloides

Scientific classification
- Domain: Eukaryota
- Kingdom: Animalia
- Phylum: Arthropoda
- Class: Insecta
- Order: Hemiptera
- Suborder: Heteroptera
- Family: Lygaeidae
- Genus: Oncopeltus
- Species: O. guttaloides

Binomial name
- Oncopeltus guttaloides Slater, 1964

= Oncopeltus guttaloides =

Species of seed bug

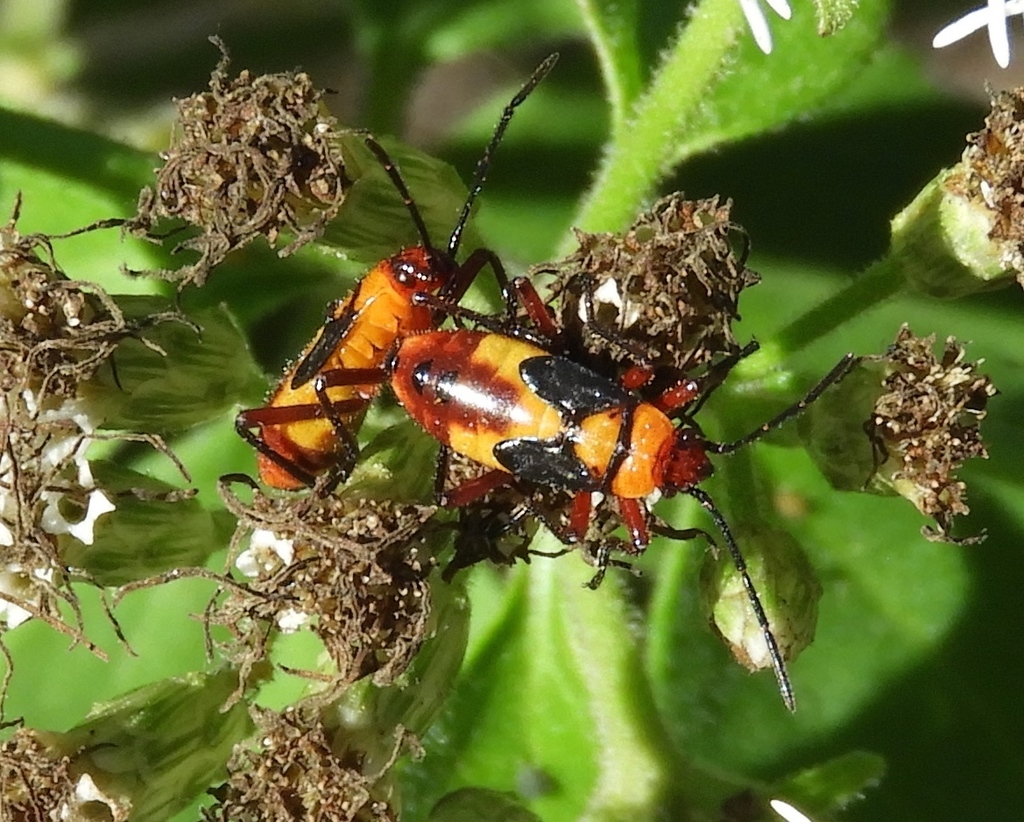
Oncopeltus guttaloides nymphs

Oncopeltus guttaloides is a species of seed bug in the family Lygaeidae. It is found in the southern Central America and the southern United States. Like other species of Oncopeltus, their nymphs are gregarious and can be found in large clusters on host plants.

== Distribution ==
Oncopeltus guttaloides is found in the southern US, Cuba, Guatemala, Honduras, Jamaica, Mexico, and Santo Domingo
