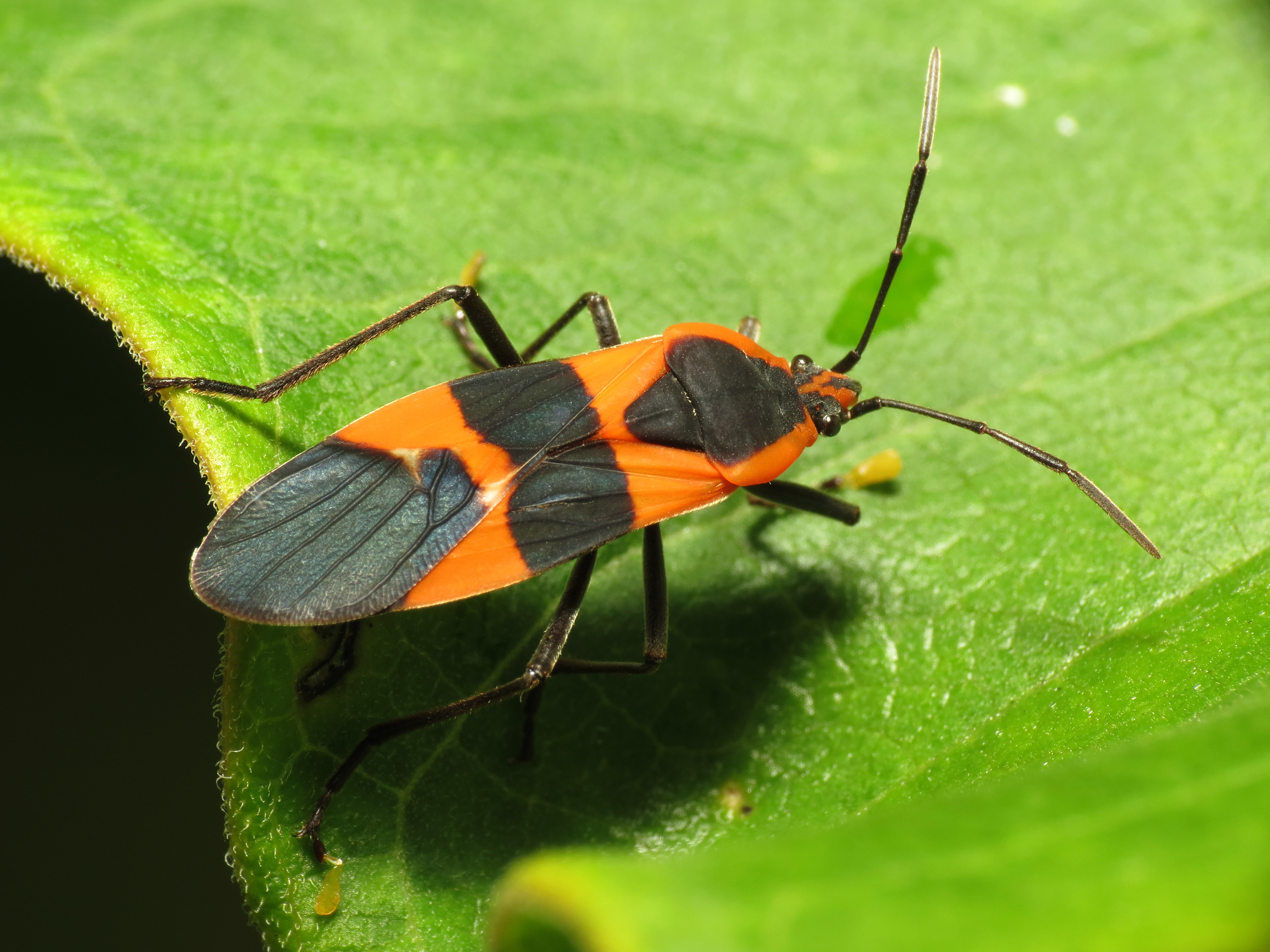
- Oncopeltus fasciatus

Scientific classification
- Domain: Eukaryota
- Kingdom: Animalia
- Phylum: Arthropoda
- Class: Insecta
- Order: Hemiptera
- Suborder: Heteroptera
- Family: Lygaeidae
- Subfamily: Lygaeinae
- Genus: Oncopeltus; Stål, 1868

= Oncopeltus =

Genus of true bugs

Oncopeltus is a genus of seed bugs in the family Lygaeidae, which has at least 40 described species.

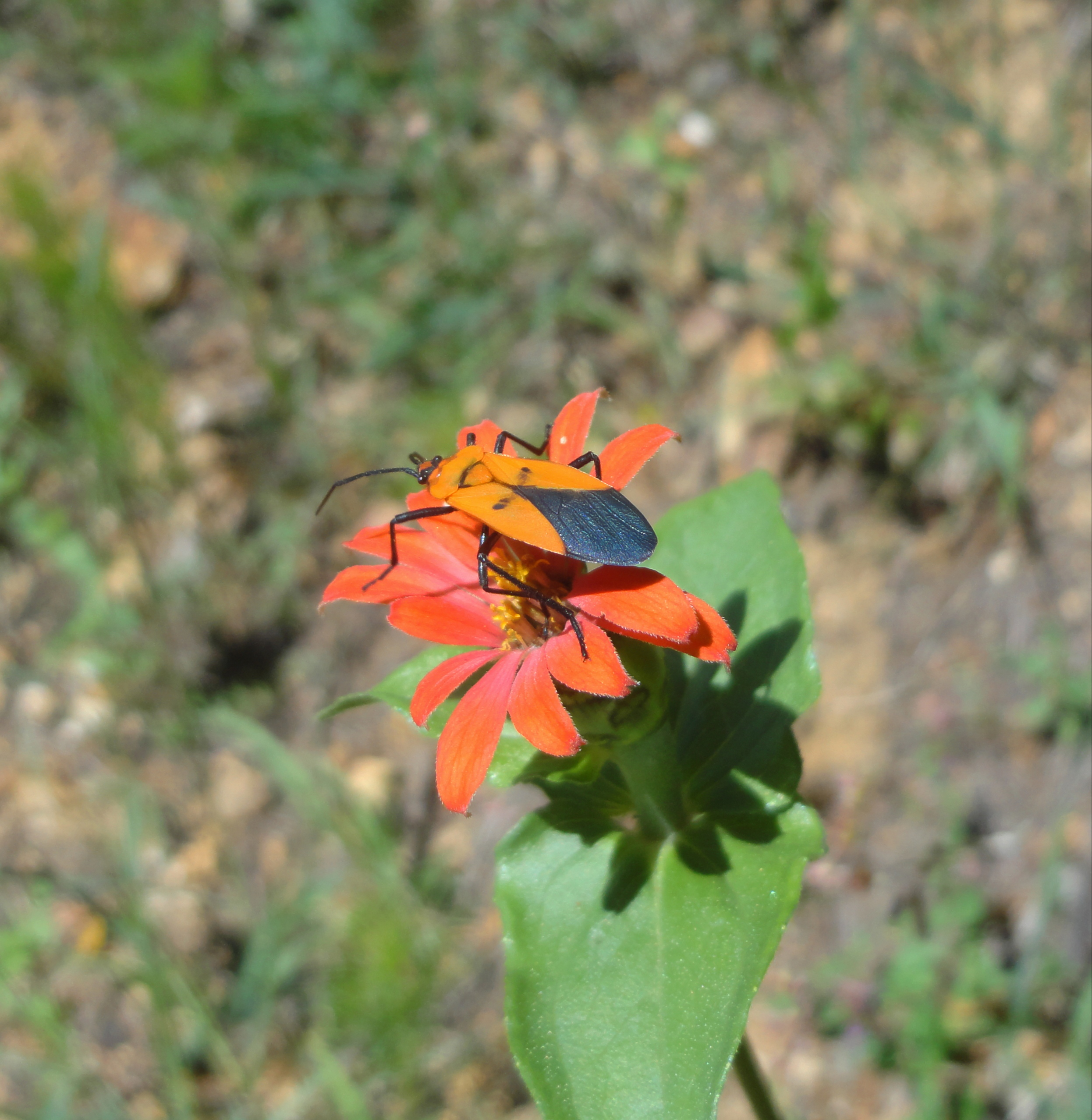
Oncopeltus varicolor

Large milkweed bug molting from third to fourth instar. Scenes of the molting followed by the entire molt at fifteen times speed. Last is superposition before to just after molt showing the increased size already.

== Species ==
These 40 species belong to the genus Oncopeltus:

- Oncopeltus atrorufus (Guerin, 1838)
- Oncopeltus aulicus Fabricius, 1775
- Oncopeltus bergianus Kirkaldy, 1909
- Oncopeltus bicinctus (Montrouzier, 1861)
- Oncopeltus bueanus Karsch, 1892
- Oncopeltus cayensis Torre-Bueno, 1944
- Oncopeltus cingulifer Stal, 1874
- Oncopeltus confusus Horvath, 1914
- Oncopeltus erebus Distant, 1918
- Oncopeltus famelicus Fabricius, 1781
- Oncopeltus fasciatus (Dallas, 1852) (large milkweed bug)
- Oncopeltus femoralis Stal, 1874
- Oncopeltus guttaloides Slater, 1964
- Oncopeltus jacobsoni Horvath, 1914
- Oncopeltus limbicollis Horvath, 1914
- Oncopeltus longicornis Horvath, 1914
- Oncopeltus longirostris Stal, 1874
- Oncopeltus luctuosus (Stal, 1867)
- Oncopeltus maoricus (Walker, 1872)
- Oncopeltus mayri Slater, 1964
- Oncopeltus microps Horvath, 1914
- Oncopeltus miles (Blanchard, 1852)
- Oncopeltus nigriceps (Dallas, 1852)
- Oncopeltus nigripennis Horvath, 1914
- Oncopeltus nigroflavatus Distant, 1918
- Oncopeltus niloticus Distant, 1918
- Oncopeltus orourkeae Faúndez & Rocca, 2017
- Oncopeltus peringueyi (Distant, 1911)
- Oncopeltus pictus Van Duzee, 1907
- Oncopeltus purpurascens Distant, 1901
- Oncopeltus quadriguttatus Fabricius, 1775
- Oncopeltus sandarachatus (Say, 1831)
- Oncopeltus sanguineolentus Van Duzee, 1914 (blood-colored milkweed bug)
- Oncopeltus semilimbatus Stal, 1874
- Oncopeltus sexmaculatus Stal, 1874 (six-spotted milkweed bug)
- Oncopeltus sordidus (Dallas, 1852)
- Oncopeltus spectabilis Van Duzee, 1909
- Oncopeltus unifasciatellus Slater, 1964
- Oncopeltus varicolor (Fabricius, 1794)
- Oncopeltus zonatus (Erichson, 1848)
