= Melanerythrus =

Scientific classification
- Kingdom: Animalia
- Phylum: Arthropoda
- Class: Insecta
- Order: Hemiptera
- Suborder: Heteroptera
- Family: Lygaeidae
- Subfamily: Lygaeinae
- Genus: Melanerythrus; Stahl, 1868

Genus of true bug

Melanerythrus is a genus of true bugs. It is found primarily on the Australian mainland, although some occurrences are also in Tasmania and Indonesia.

There are five species recognized in this genus:

- Melanerythrus biguttatus (Fabricius, 1775)
- Melanerythrus ignitus Slater Alex, 1985
- Melanerythrus mactans (Stal, 1867)
- Melanerythrus mutilatus (Erichson, 1842)
- Melanerythrus uptoni Slater
