= Ground bug =

Ground bug or groundbug is a term that has not been used with a great deal of precision. It has been used to refer to the following Pentatomomorpha:

- the lygaeoid bugs (Lygaeoidea):
  - Heterogastridae, for example Heterogaster urticae (Fabricius, 1775) - the "Nettle Ground Bug"
  - Lygaeidae
  - Piesmatidae
- Others:
  - Cydnidae more commonly known as the "burrowing bugs", and some as "ground pearls", but notably Microporus nigrita - "Black Ground Bug"
  - Dipsocoridae, known as the "jumping ground bugs"
