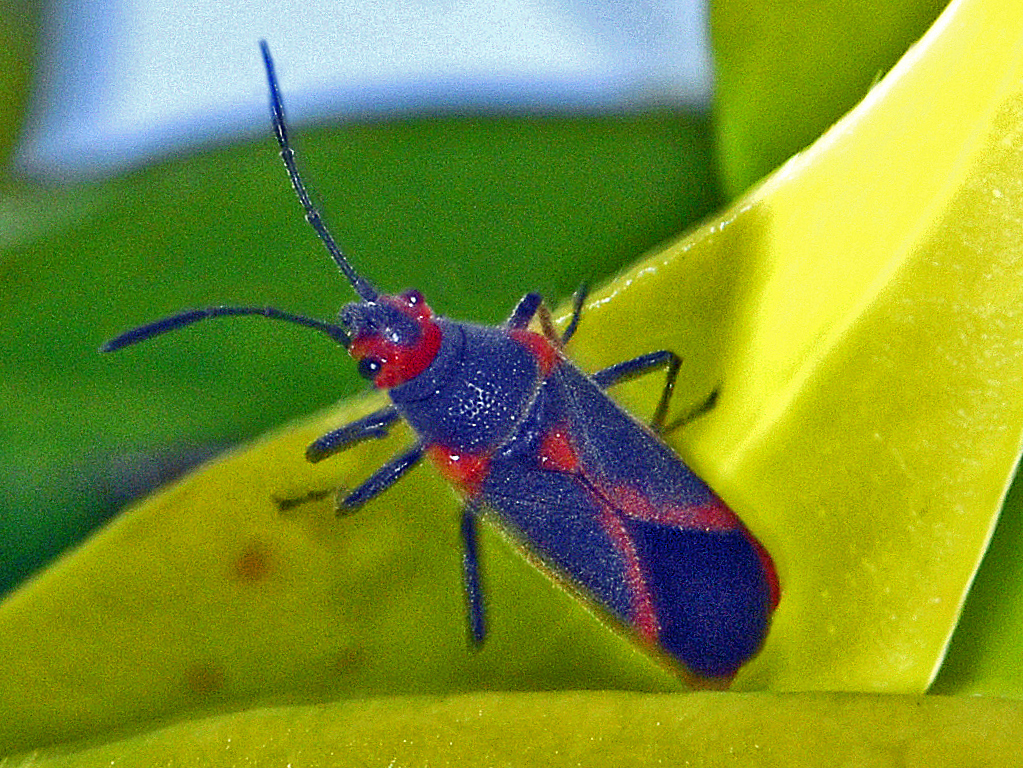
- Caenocoris nerii, upperside
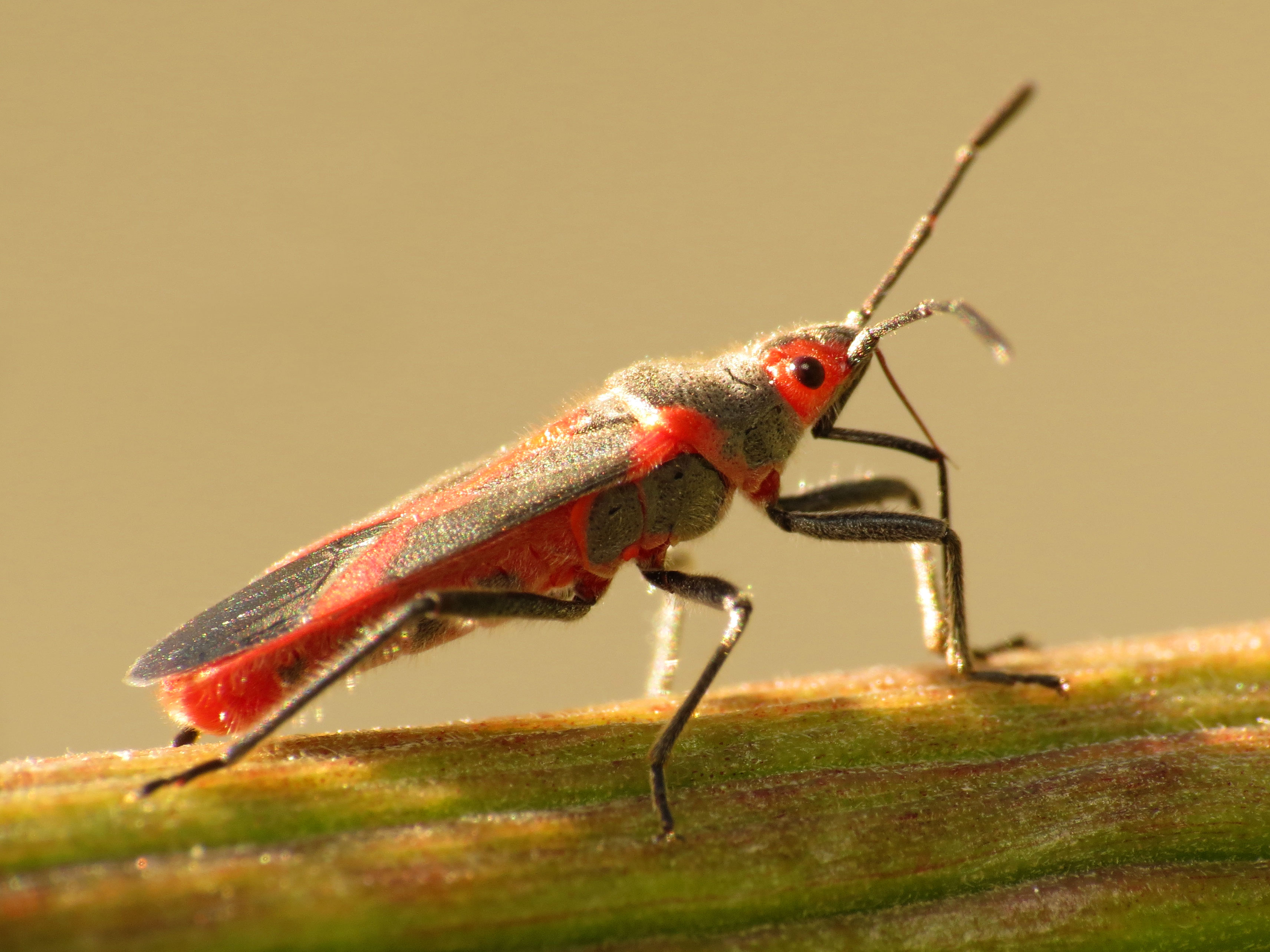
- Side view

Scientific classification
- Kingdom: Animalia
- Phylum: Arthropoda
- Class: Insecta
- Order: Hemiptera
- Suborder: Heteroptera
- Family: Lygaeidae
- Genus: Caenocoris
- Species: C. nerii

Binomial name
- Caenocoris nerii (Germar, 1847)

= Caenocoris nerii =

Species of true bug

Caenocoris nerii, common name oleander seedbug, is a species of ground bugs in the insect family Lygaeidae.

== Etymology ==
The species name nerii refers to the main host plant Nerium oleander.

== Distribution ==
This species is present in part of Europe (Albania, Bulgaria, Cyprus, France, Greece, Italy and Spain), in the Afrotropical realm and in the Indomalayan realm.

== Description ==
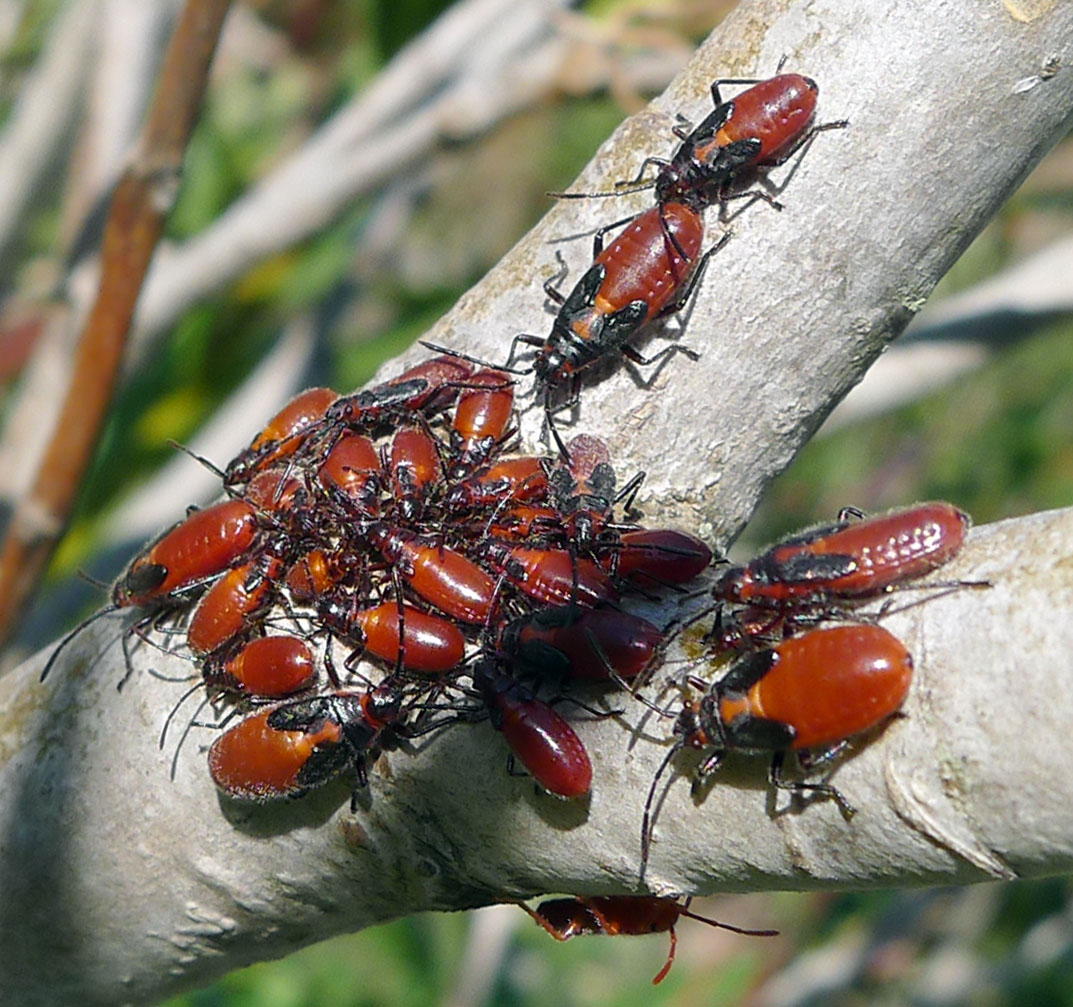
Aggregation of nymphs

Caenocoris nerii can reach a length of about 7.5–9.5 millimetres (0.30–0.37 in). The female is larger than the male. Bodies are elongated. The basic color of the body is black, with red markings. Two red quadrangular patches are present on the head. Two red markings appear on the shoulders of pronotum and at the inner margins of the hemielytra, which only partially cover the membranous blackish wings. Scutellum and abdomen are completely red.

== Biology ==
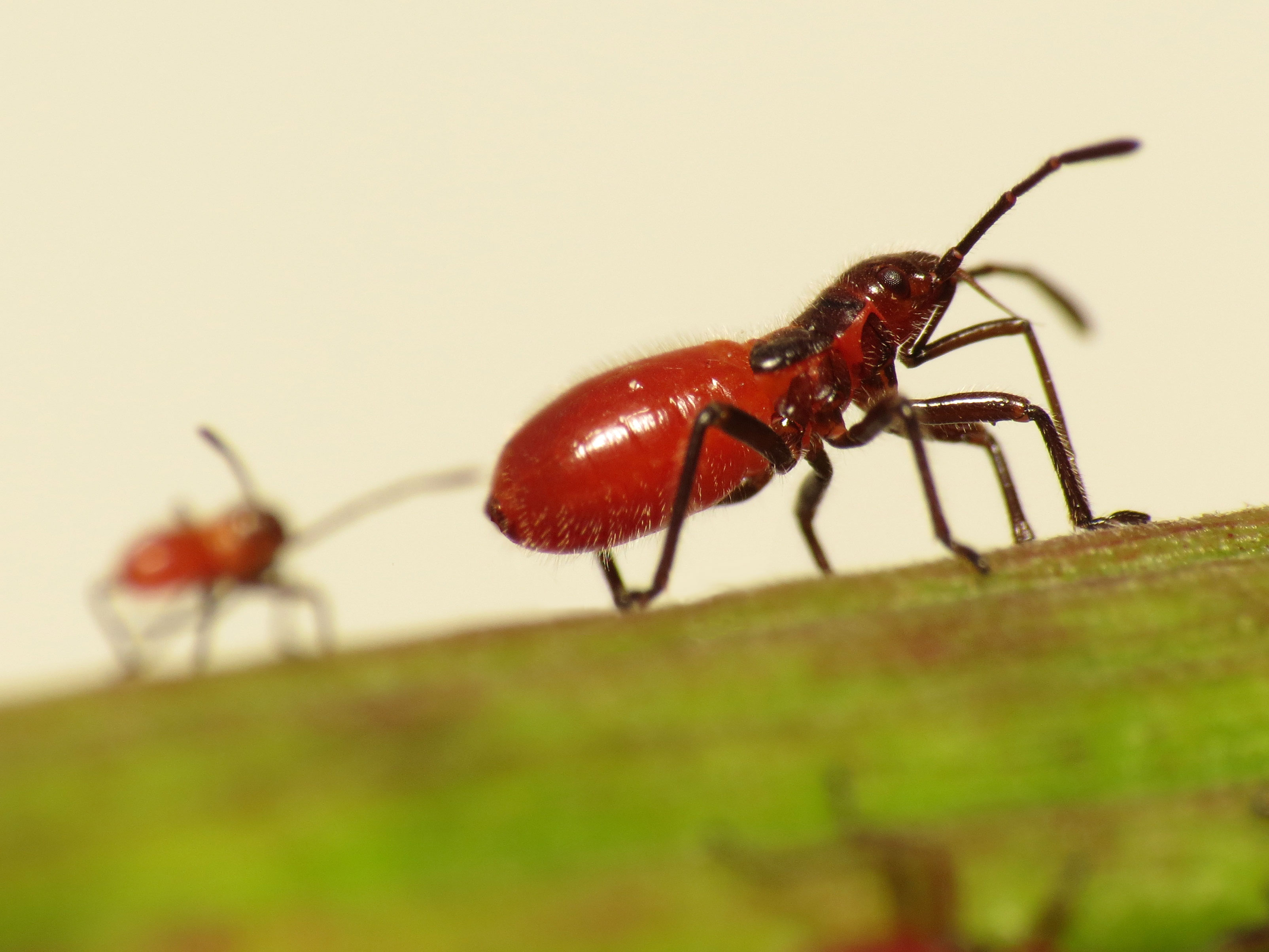
Nymph, side view

Females usually lay eggs on the leaves of Nerium oleander (hence the common name of the species). All stages of nymphs suck almost exclusively the milky juice of the main host plant (Nerium oleander), but they may also feed on Asclepiadaceae species. Nynphs overwinter. Adults normally feed on the Oleander's fruits and seed. These aposematic bugs are usually rejected by predators because of their toxins derived from the host plant.
