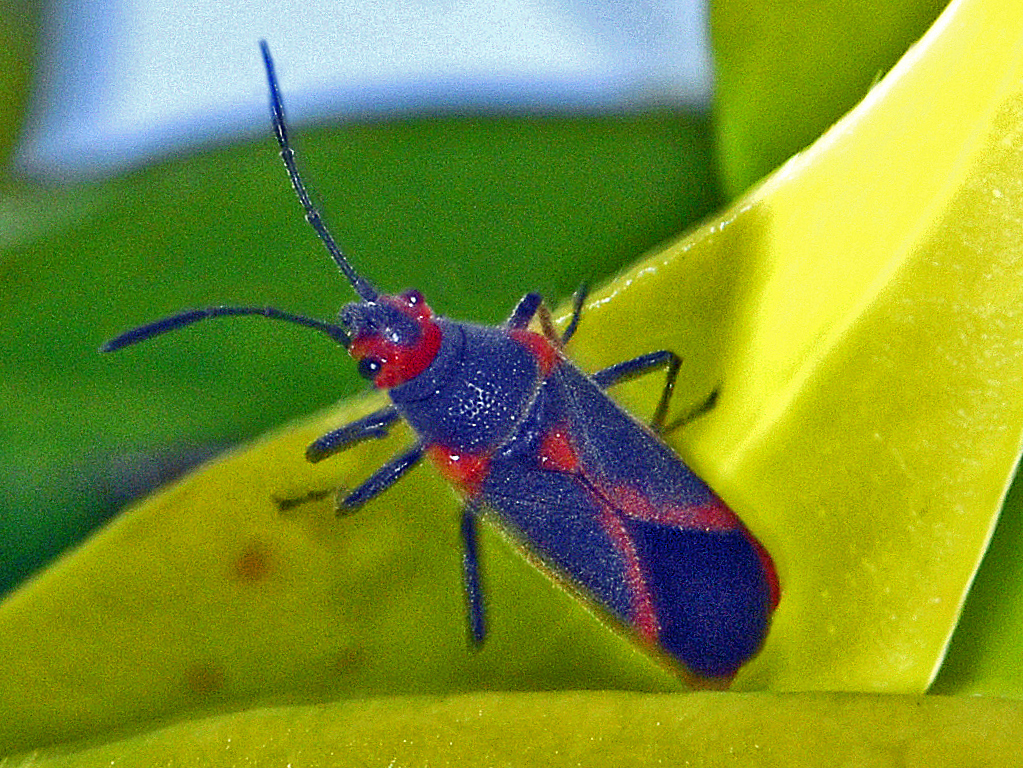
- Caenocoris nerii

Scientific classification
- Domain: Eukaryota
- Kingdom: Animalia
- Phylum: Arthropoda
- Class: Insecta
- Order: Hemiptera
- Suborder: Heteroptera
- Family: Lygaeidae
- Subfamily: Lygaeinae; Schilling, 1829

= Lygaeinae =

Subfamily of true bugs

Lygaeinae is a subfamily of ground bugs in the insect family Lygaeidae.

== Genera ==
Genera within this subfamily include:

1. Achlyosomus Slater Alex, 1992
2. Acrobrachys Horvath, 1914
3. Acroleucus Stal, 1874
4. Aethalotus Stal, 1874
5. Afraethalotus Scudder, 1963
6. Anochrostomus Slater Alex, 1992
7. Apterola Mulsant & Rey, 1866
8. Arocatus Spinola, 1837
9. Aspilocoryphus Stal, 1874
10. Aspilogeton Breddin, 1901
11. Astacops Boisduval, 1835
12. Aulacopeltus Stal, 1868
13. Biblochrimnus Brailovsky, 1982
14. Caenocoris Fieber, 1860
15. Cosmopleurus Stal, 1872
16. Craspeduchus Stal, 1874
17. Dalmochrimnus Brailovsky, 1982
18. Ektyphonotus Slater Alex, 1992
19. Emphanisis China, 1925
20. Gondarius Stys, 1972
21. Graptostethus Stal, 1868
22. Hadrosomus Slater Alex, 1992
23. Haematorrhytus Stal, 1874
24. Haemobaphus Stal, 1874
25. Hormopleurus Horvath, 1884
26. Horvathiolus Josifov, 1965
27. Karachicoris Stys, 1972
28. Latochrimnus Brailovsky, 1982
29. Lygaeodema Horvath, 1924
30. Lygaeosoma Spinola, 1837
31. Lygaeospilus Barber, 1921
32. Lygaeus Fabricius, 1794
33. Melacoryphus Slater Alex, 1988
34. Melanerythrus Stal, 1868
35. Melanocoryphus Stal, 1872
36. Melanopleuroides Slater & Baranowski, 2001
37. Melanopleurus Stal, 1874
38. Melanostethus Stal, 1868
39. Melanotelus Reuter, 1885
40. Microspilus Stal, 1868
41. Neacoryphus Scudder, 1965
42. Nesostethus Kirkaldy, 1908
43. Nicuesa Distant, 1893
44. Ochrimnus Stal, 1874
45. Ochrostomus Stal, 1874
46. Oncopeltus Stal, 1868
47. Orsillacis Barber, 1914
48. Oxygranulobaphus Brailovsky, 1982
49. Paranysius Horvath, 1895
50. Pseudoacroleucoides Brailovsky, 1982
51. Psileula Seidenstucker, 1964
52. Pyrrhobaphus Stal, 1868
53. Scopiastella Slater, 1957
54. Scopiastes Stal, 1874
55. Spilostethus Stal, 1868
56. Stalagmostethus Stal, 1868
57. Stenaptula Seidenstucker, 1964
58. Stictocricus Horvath, 1914
59. Thunbergia Horvath, 1914 (Thunberg seedbugs)
60. Torvochrimnus Brailovsky, 1982
61. Tropidothorax Bergroth, 1894
62. Woodwardiastes Slater Alex, 1985
63. Zygochrimnus Brailovsky, 2018
64. † Mesolygaeus Ping, 1928
