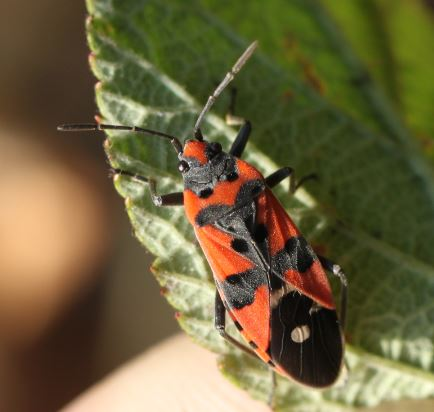
- Adult of Lygaeus equestris

Scientific classification
- Kingdom: Animalia
- Phylum: Arthropoda
- Clade: Pancrustacea
- Class: Insecta
- Order: Hemiptera
- Suborder: Heteroptera
- Family: Lygaeidae
- Genus: Lygaeus
- Species: L. equestris

Binomial name
- Lygaeus equestris (1758)

Synonyms
- Spilostethus equestris; Cimex equestris 1758

= Lygaeus equestris =

Species of true bug

Lygaeus equestris, common name black-and-red-bug, is a species of seed bugs belonging to the family Lygaeidae, subfamily Lygaeinae.

== Subspecies ==
Subspecies include:

- Lygaeus equestris equestris (Linnaeus, 1758)
- Lygaeus equestris sicilianus (Wagner, 1955)

== Description ==
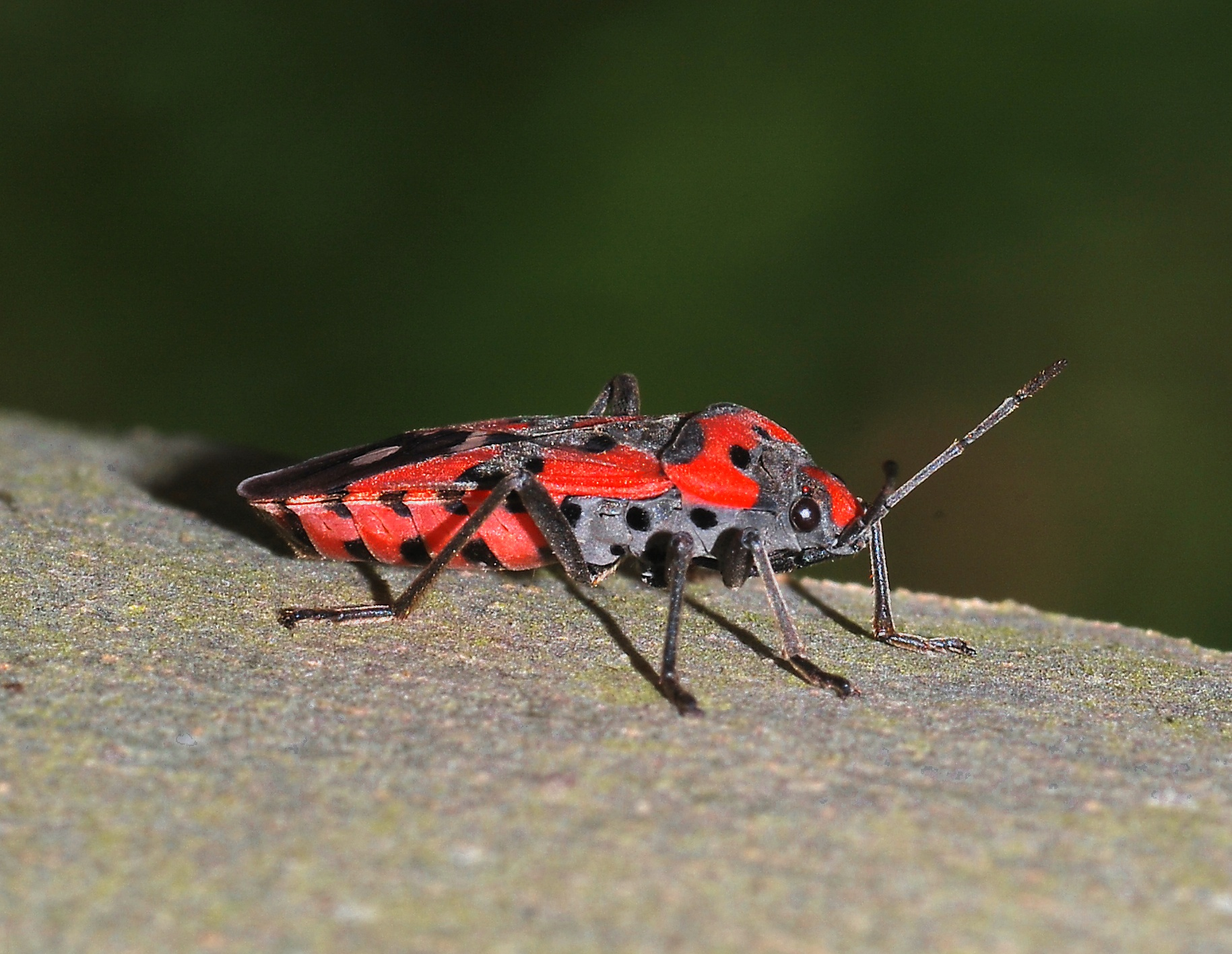
Side view

These bugs can reach about 11 to 12 millimetres (0.43 to 0.47 in) in length. They have a characteristic red-black pattern, fully developed wings and long, powerful legs. The hemelytra have two transverse bands that reach the margin and a round white spot on the membrane. Scutellum is without bristles but with tiny hairs. The black band close to the eye is wider than the same.

This species is very difficult to differentiate from Lygaeus simulans, that has a scutellum with long bristles, antennae with angulous tubercles and a larger red area on the head.

The red-black pattern has a deterrent effect and serves to protect the insect (Müllerian mimicry or Batesian mimicry). By storing the toxic ingredients of their food plants, they are unpalatable to potential predators.

== Biology ==
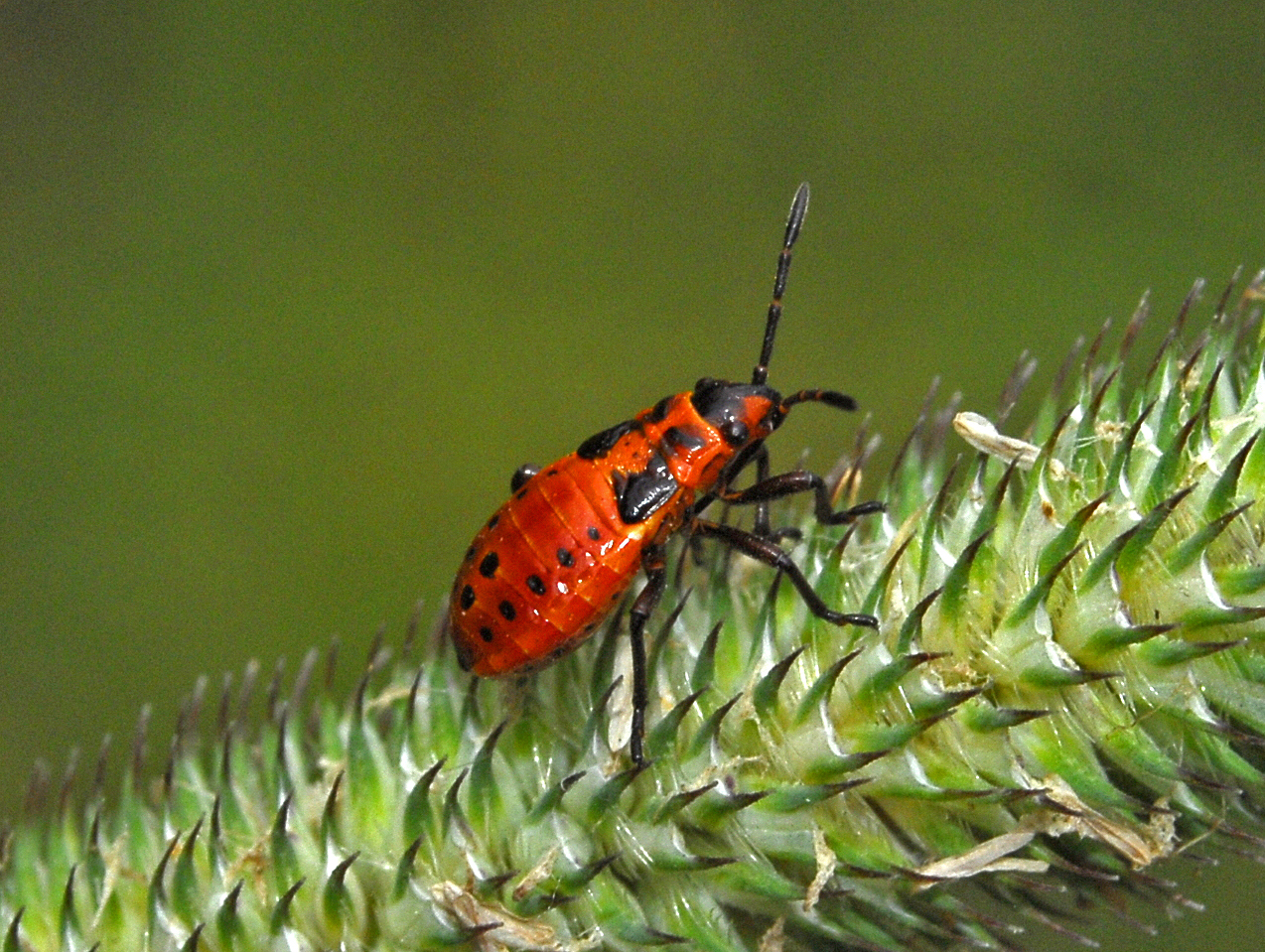
Nymph of Lygaeus equestris

The nymphs and the imagos feed on juices of various plants, particularly milkweed (Vincetoxicum hirundinaria), Taraxacum species, Spring pheasant's eye (Adonis vernalis) and sometimes also on dandelions. Adults overwinter.

== Distribution and habitat ==
It is mainly present in Albania, Austria, Belgium, Bosnia, Bulgaria, Brazil, Croatia, Czech Republic, Denmark, Finland, France, Germany, Gibraltar, Greece, Hungary, Italy, Montenegro, North Macedonia, Poland, Portugal, Romania, Russia, Serbia, Slovakia, Slovenia, Spain, Sweden and Switzerland. It inhabits lawns, forests clearings and scrubs, generally in warm calcareous areas.

== Bibliography ==
- O Kugelberg - 1977 - Distribution, feeding habits and dispersal of Lygaeus equestris. (Heteroptera) larvae in relation to food supply L. equestris
- T. J. Henry: Phylogenetic analysis of family groups within the infraorder Pentatomomorpha (Hemiptera: Heteroptera), with emphasis on the Lygaeoidea. Annals of the Entomological Society of America 90: 275–301, 1997.
- Pericart J. - Family Lygaeidae in Catalogue of the Heteroptera of the Palaearctic Region 4: 35-220. 2001
- Birgitta Sillén-Tullberg and Christer Solbreck Oikos - Population Dynamics of a Seed Feeding Bug, Lygaeus Equestris. 2. Temporal Dynamics -

Vol. 58, No. 2 (Jun., 1990), pp. 210–218
