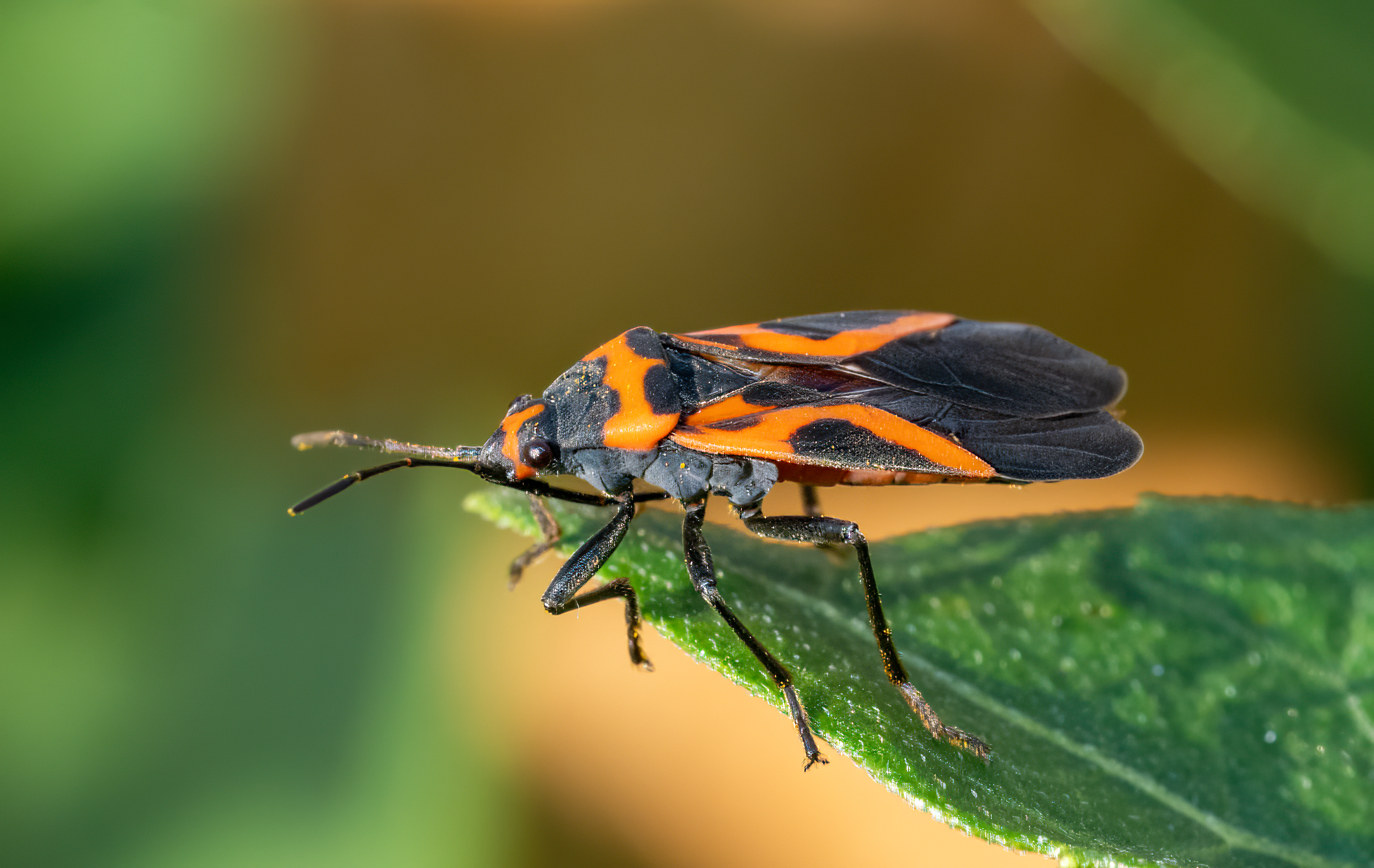

Scientific classification
- Kingdom: Animalia
- Phylum: Arthropoda
- Class: Insecta
- Order: Hemiptera
- Suborder: Heteroptera
- Family: Lygaeidae
- Genus: Lygaeus
- Species: L. turcicus

Binomial name
- Lygaeus turcicus Fabricius, 1803

= Lygaeus turcicus =

Species of true bug

Lygaeus turcicus, the false milkweed bug, is a species of seed bug in the family Lygaeidae. It is found in Eastern North America.

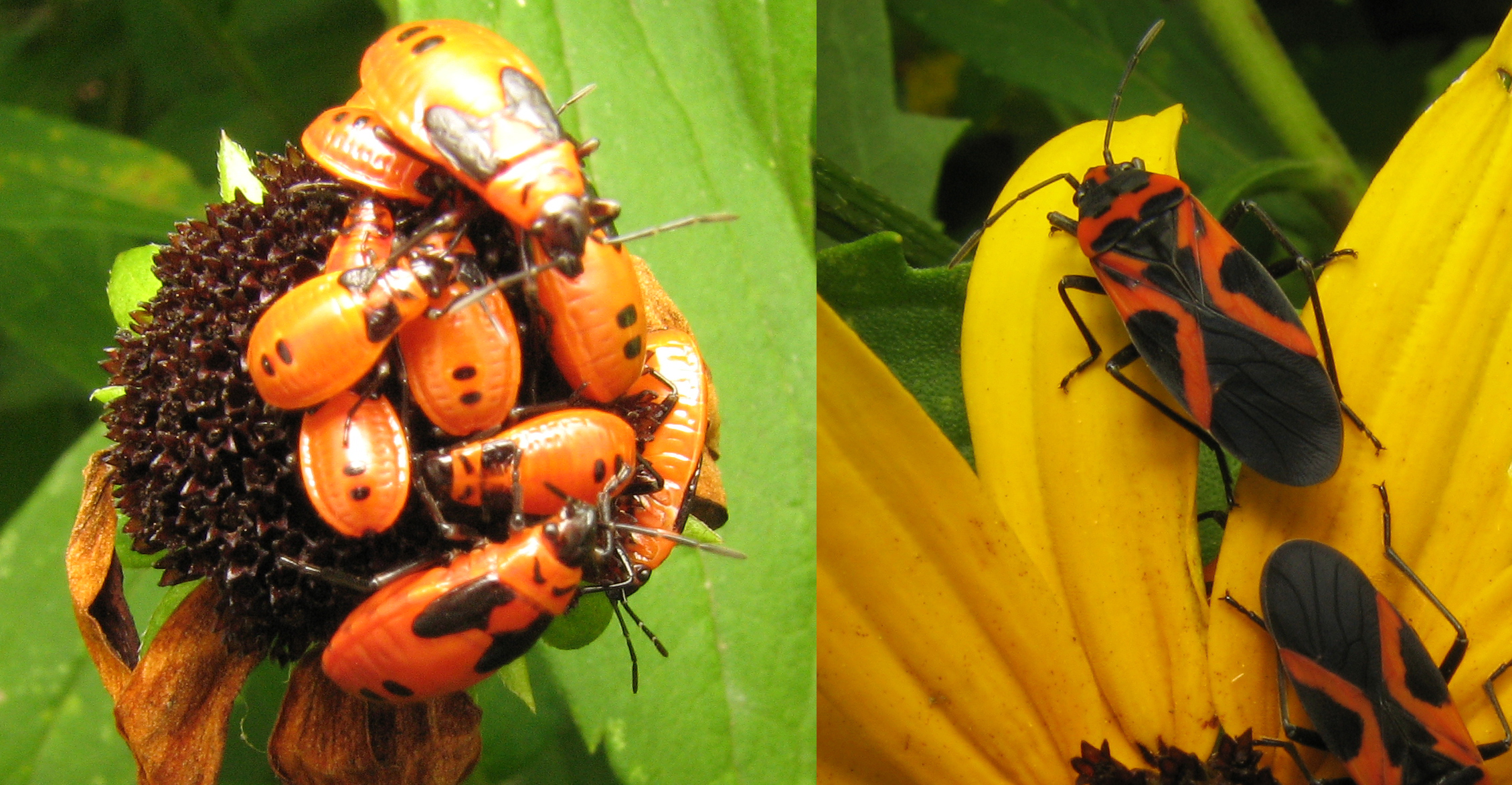
False milkweed bug, Lygaeus turcicus

== Description ==
The false milkweed bug is widely distributed across the eastern United States and Canada. It primarily feeds on the seeds of false sunflower, Heliopsis helianthoides. The false milkweed bug is commonly confused with other black and red or orange insects, including Oncopeltus fasciatus, Lygaeus kalmii, and Lygaeus reclivatus.
