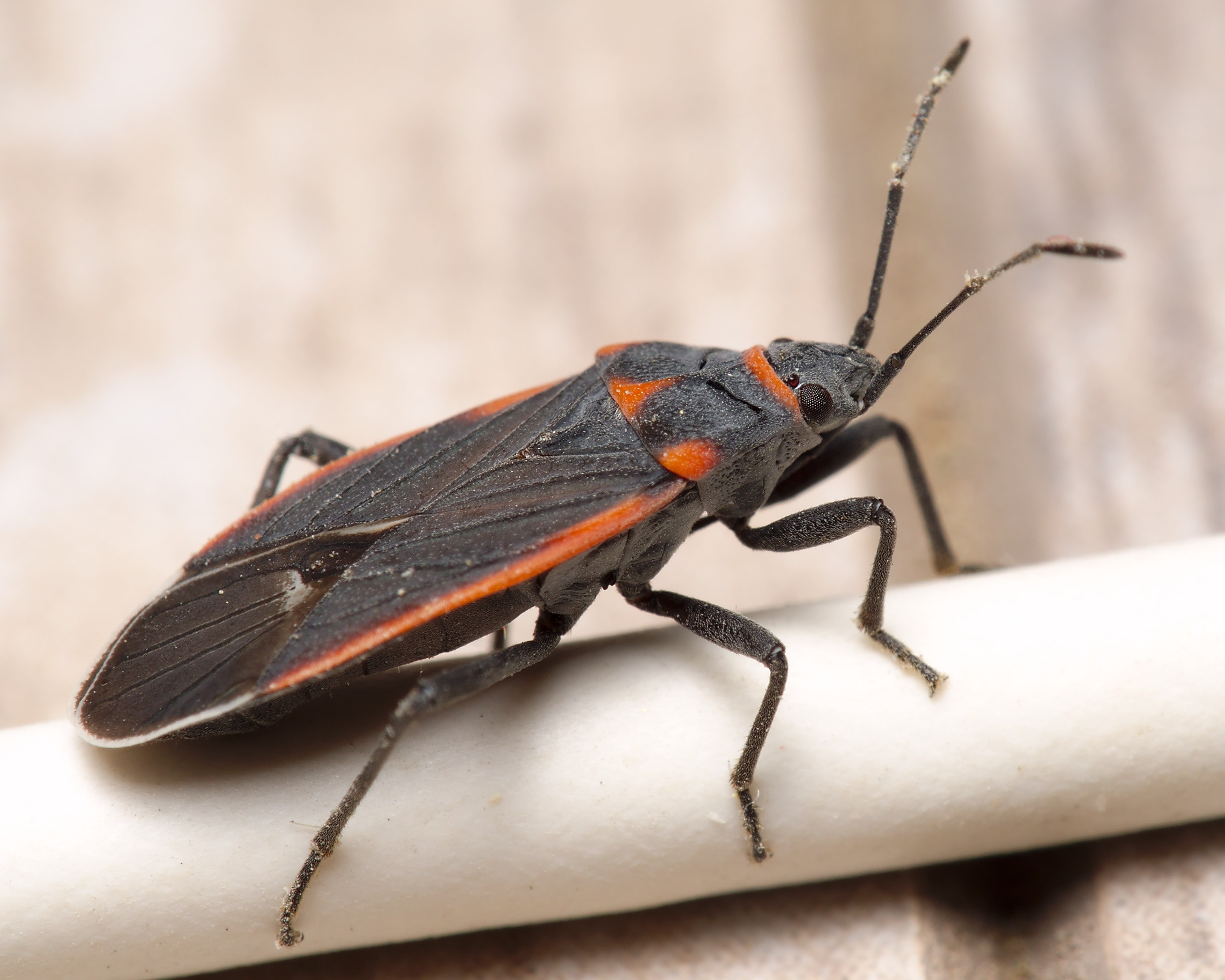

Scientific classification
- Kingdom: Animalia
- Phylum: Arthropoda
- Class: Insecta
- Order: Hemiptera
- Suborder: Heteroptera
- Family: Lygaeidae
- Genus: Melacoryphus
- Species: M. lateralis

Binomial name
- Melacoryphus lateralis Dallas, 1852

Synonyms
- Melanocoryphus lateralis; Neacoryphus lateralis

= Melacoryphus lateralis =

Species of true bug

Melacoryphus lateralis pronounced (mela-co-riff-is ladder-a-lis) a species of Hemiptera, or true bug one of several called black-and-red seed bug. Black and fringed with red and gray, some call it the charcoal seed bug, due to its resemblance to a dying ember. Native to the deserts of western North America, they have a tendency to appear in large numbers in the late summer. The Melacoryphus lateralis are close relatives of the small milkweed bug, another black-and-orange insect and are also very durable being able to survive being stomped on. Body sizes range from 0.06 inches (1.5 mm) up to 0.47 inches (12 mm).
