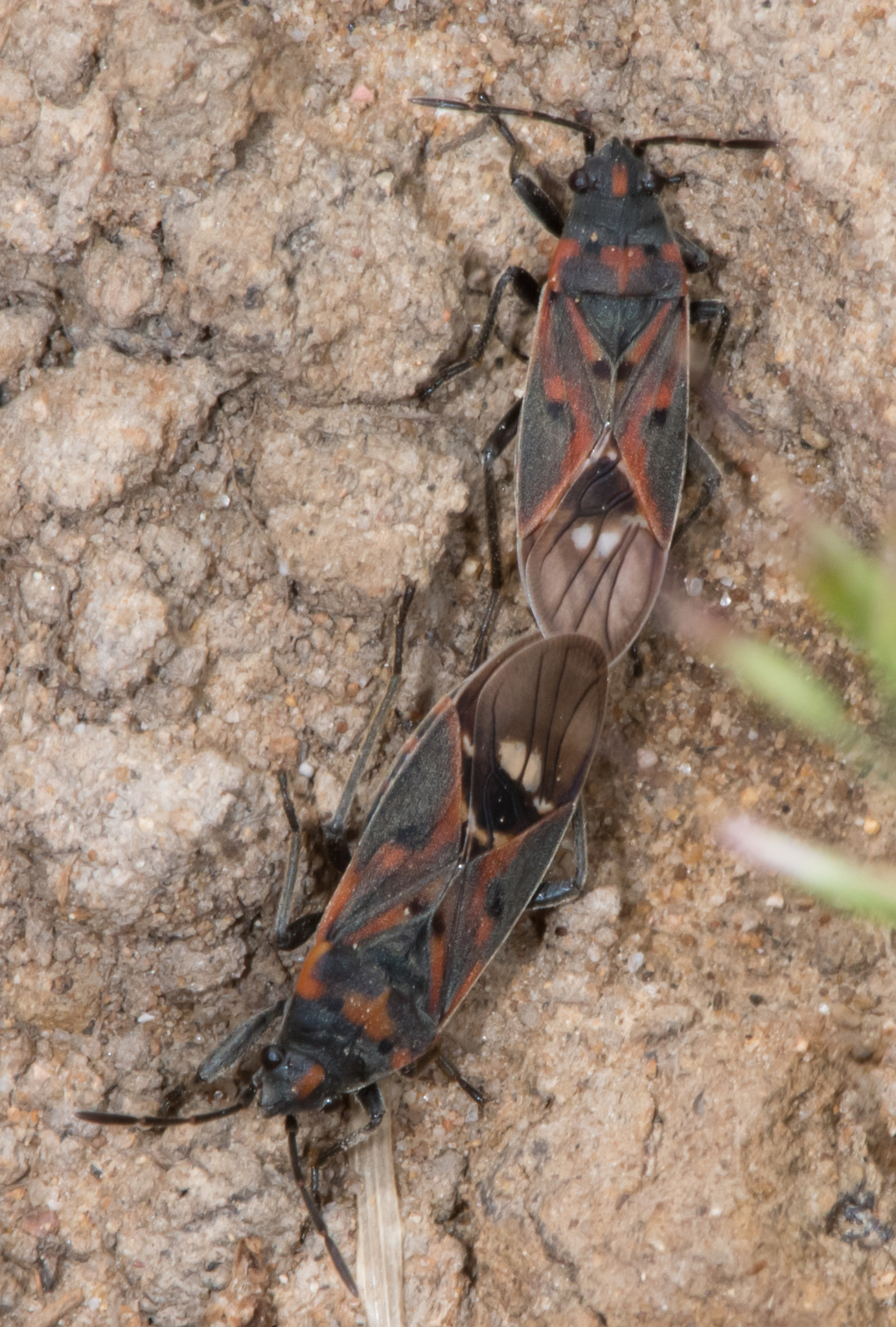
- Lygaeus truculentus

Scientific classification
- Kingdom: Animalia
- Phylum: Arthropoda
- Clade: Pancrustacea
- Class: Insecta
- Order: Hemiptera
- Suborder: Heteroptera
- Family: Lygaeidae
- Subfamily: Lygaeinae
- Genus: Lygaeus
- Species: L. truculentus

Binomial name
- Lygaeus truculentus Stål, 1862

= Lygaeus truculentus =

Species of seed bug

Lygaeus truculentus is a species of seed bug in the family Lygaeidae, found in California.
