= Lygaeus slateri =

Scientific classification
- Kingdom: Animalia
- Phylum: Arthropoda
- Class: Insecta
- Order: Hemiptera
- Suborder: Heteroptera
- Family: Lygaeidae
- Genus: Lygaeus
- Species: L. slateri

Binomial name
- Lygaeus slateri (Gorski, 1968)

Species of insect

Lygaeus slateri is a species of seed bug.
