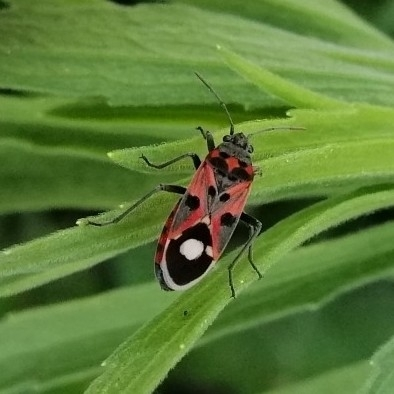
- Lygaeus alboornatus, Bolivia

Scientific classification
- Domain: Eukaryota
- Kingdom: Animalia
- Phylum: Arthropoda
- Class: Insecta
- Order: Hemiptera
- Suborder: Heteroptera
- Family: Lygaeidae
- Subfamily: Lygaeinae
- Genus: Lygaeus
- Species: L. alboornatus

Binomial name
- Lygaeus alboornatus Blanchard, 1852

= Lygaeus alboornatus =

Species of true bug

Lygaeus alboornatus is a species of seed bug in the family Lygaeidae, found mainly in South America.
