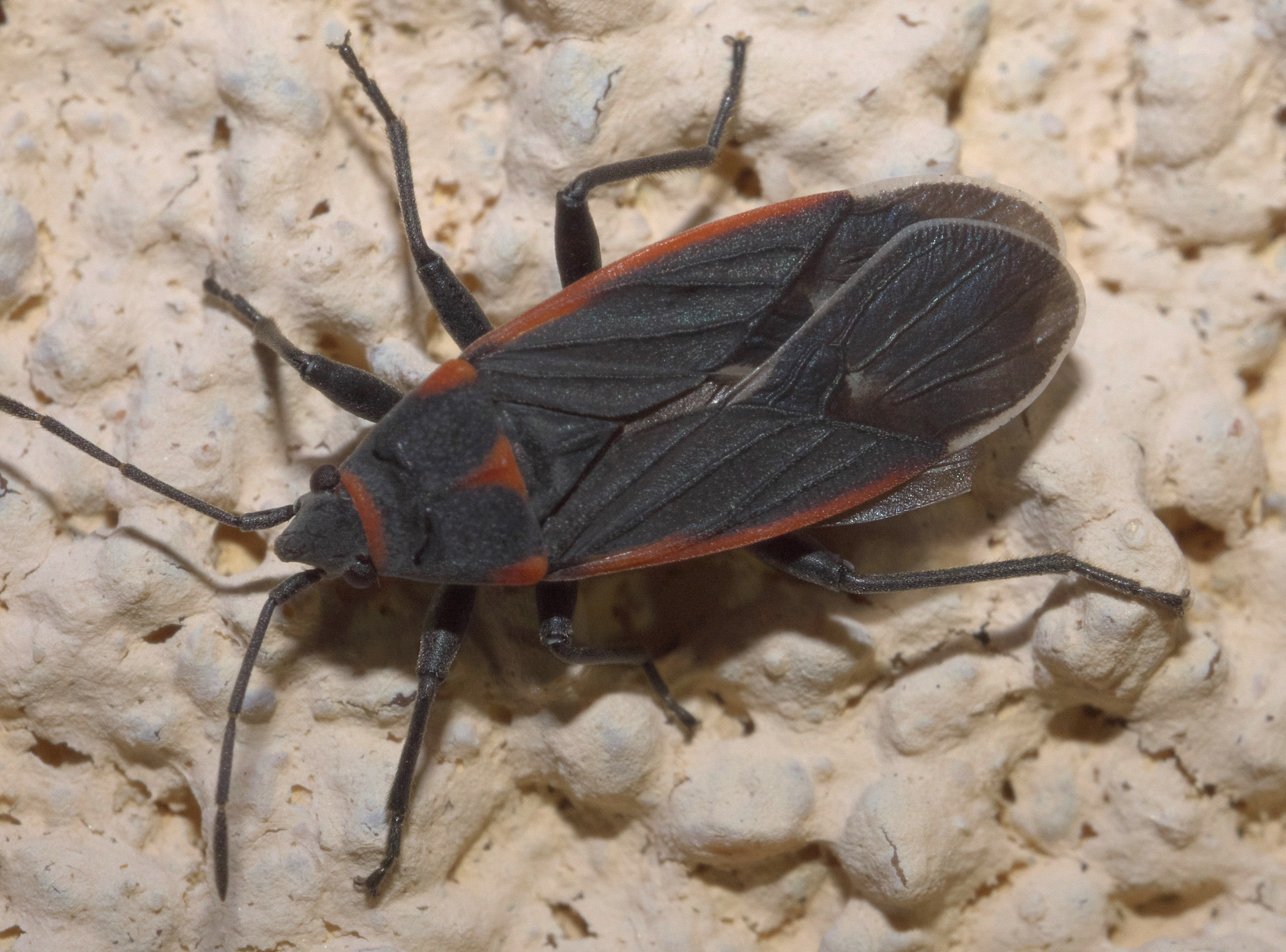
- Melacoryphus lateralis

Scientific classification
- Domain: Eukaryota
- Kingdom: Animalia
- Phylum: Arthropoda
- Class: Insecta
- Order: Hemiptera
- Suborder: Heteroptera
- Family: Lygaeidae
- Subfamily: Lygaeinae
- Genus: Melacoryphus; Alex Slater, 1988

= Melacoryphus =

Genus of true bugs

Melacoryphus is a genus of seed bugs in the family Lygaeidae. There are about 11 described species in Melacoryphus, found in Central and North America.

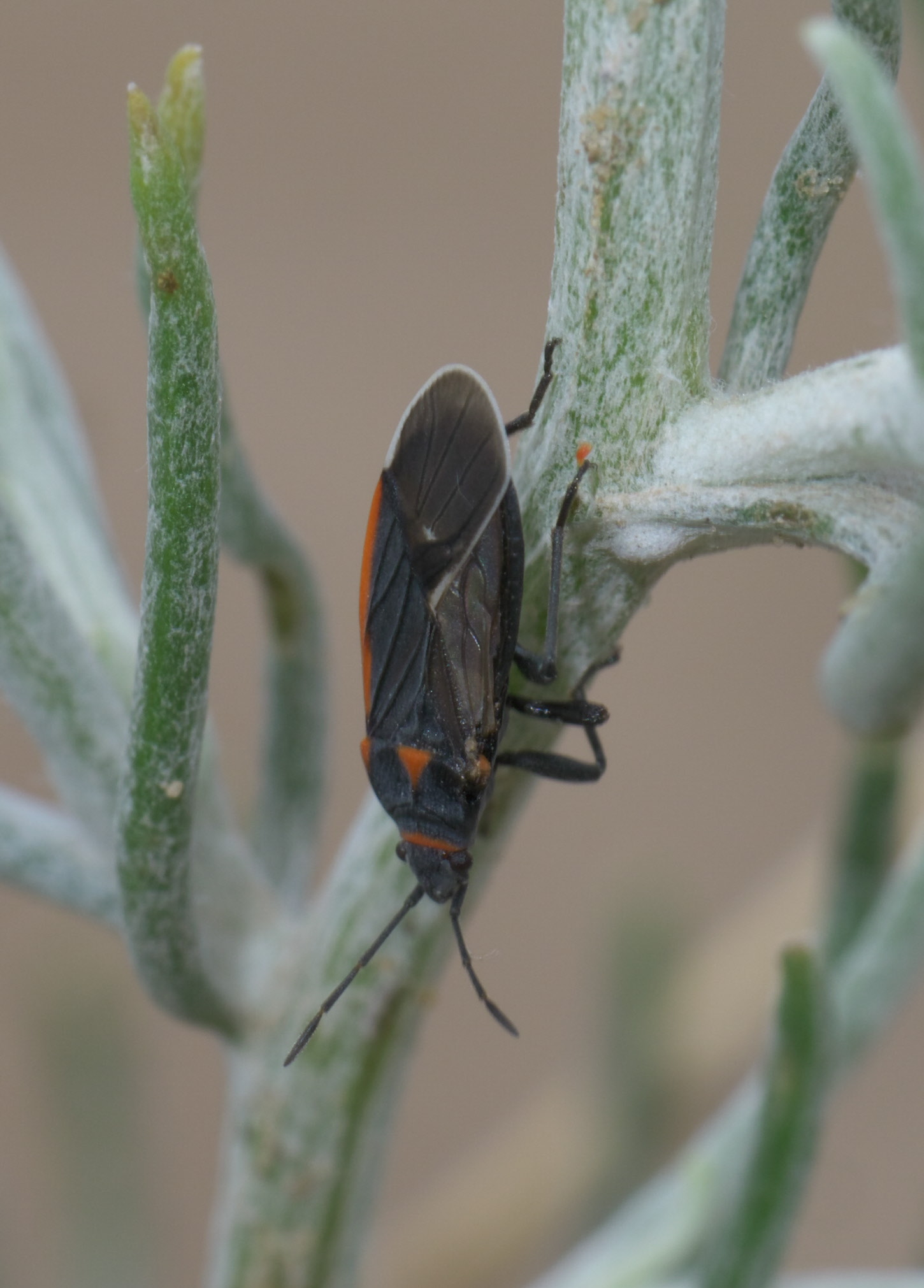
Melacoryphus lateralis

== Species ==
- Melacoryphus admirabilis (Uhler, 1872)
- Melacoryphus circumlitus (Stal, 1862)
- Melacoryphus facetus (Say, 1831)
- Melacoryphus lagunensis Cervantes & Brailovsky, 2014
- Melacoryphus lateralis (Dallas, 1852)
- Melacoryphus micropterus A. Slater, 1988
- Melacoryphus nigrinervis (Stal, 1874)
- Melacoryphus pedregalensis Brailovsky, 1977
- Melacoryphus rubicollis (Uhler, 1894)
- Melacoryphus rubriger (Stal, 1862)
- Melacoryphus rubrolimbatus A. Slater, 1988
