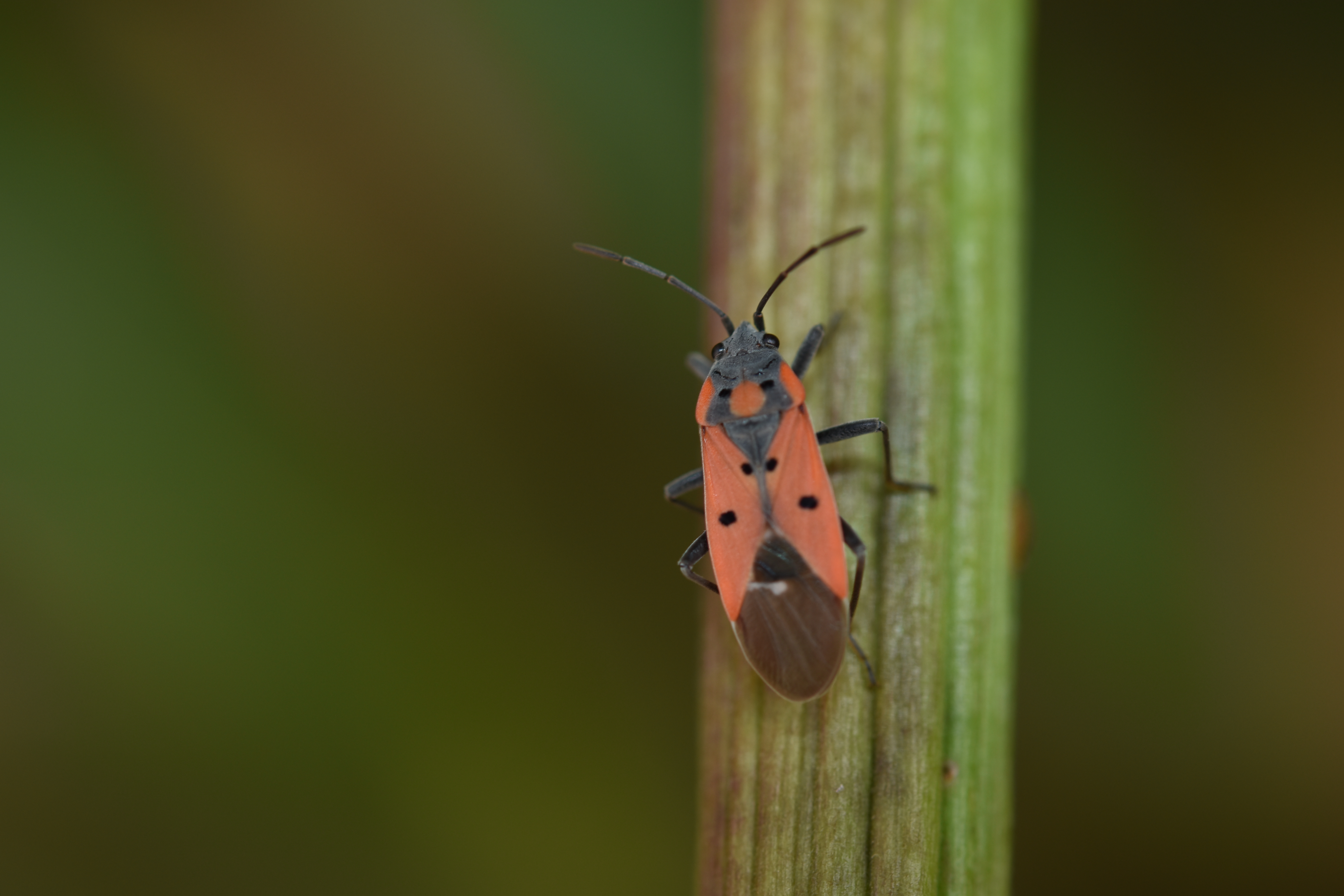

Scientific classification
- Kingdom: Animalia
- Phylum: Arthropoda
- Clade: Pancrustacea
- Class: Insecta
- Order: Hemiptera
- Suborder: Heteroptera
- Family: Lygaeidae
- Subfamily: Lygaeinae
- Genus: Lygaeus
- Species: L. creticus

Binomial name
- Lygaeus creticus Lucas, 1853

= Lygaeus creticus =

Species of seed bug in the family Lygaeidae

Lygaeus creticus is a species of seed bug in the family Lygaeidae. It is found in areas around the Mediterranean Sea.

== Taxonomy ==
Lygaeus creticus was first formally named in 1853 by French entomologist Hippolyte Lucas in Essai sur les animaux articulés qui habitent l'île de Crète.

== Description ==
Both nymphs (image) and adults (image) of Lygaeus creticus are aposematically colored.

== Reproduction ==
Egg mean clutch size has been noted as 20.7 ± 1.76 for once‐mated females. Males have been observed to harass female Lygaeus equestris.

== Diet ==
Lygaeus creticus is phytophagous on Nerium oleander and Sorbus cretica.
