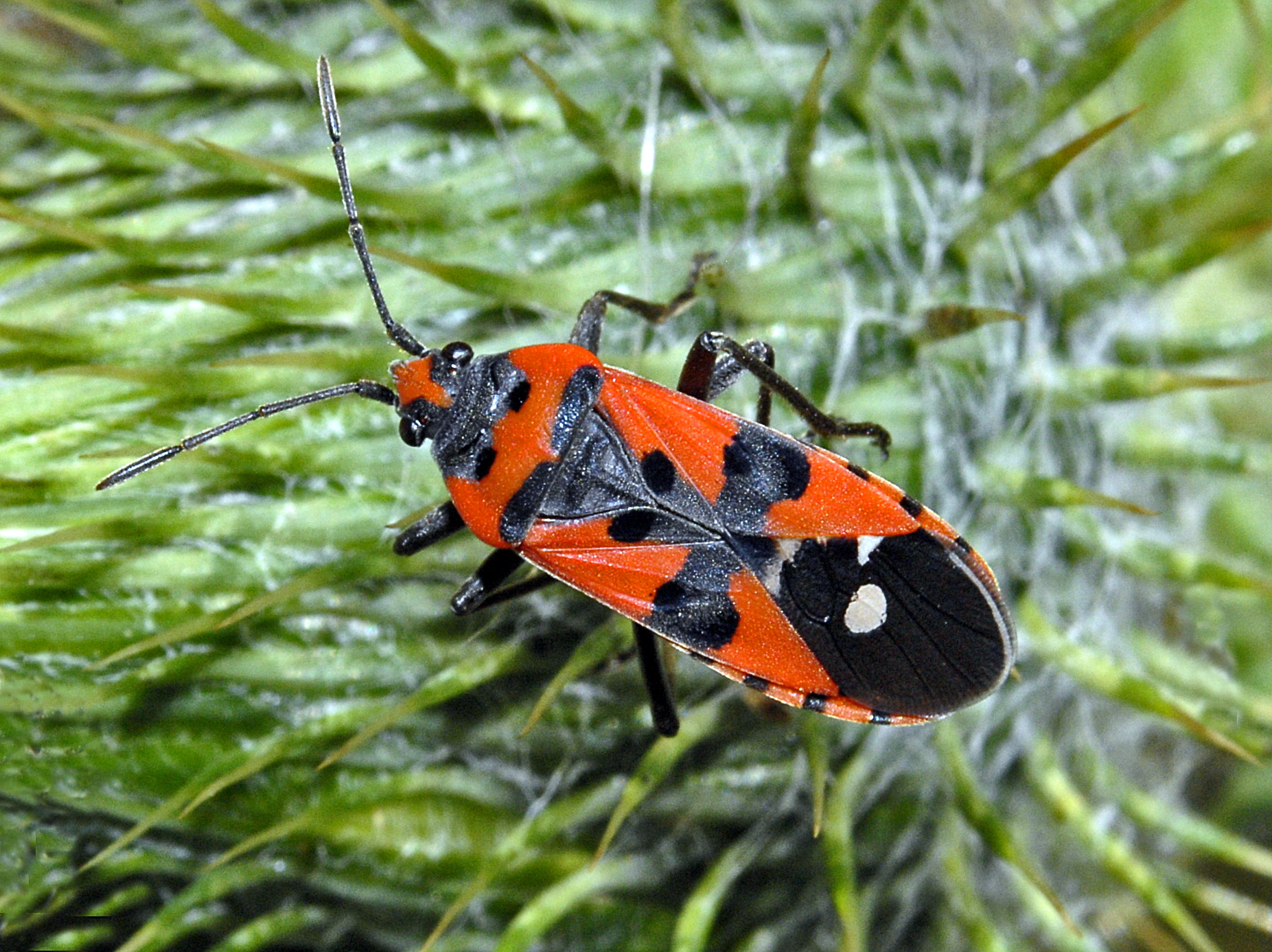
- Lygaeus equestris

Scientific classification
- Kingdom: Animalia
- Phylum: Arthropoda
- Class: Insecta
- Order: Hemiptera
- Suborder: Heteroptera
- Family: Lygaeidae
- Subfamily: Lygaeinae
- Genus: Lygaeus; Fabricius, 1794

= Lygaeus =

Genus of true bugs

Lygaeus is a genus of seed bugs in the family Lygaeidae. There are more than 60 described species in Lygaeus.

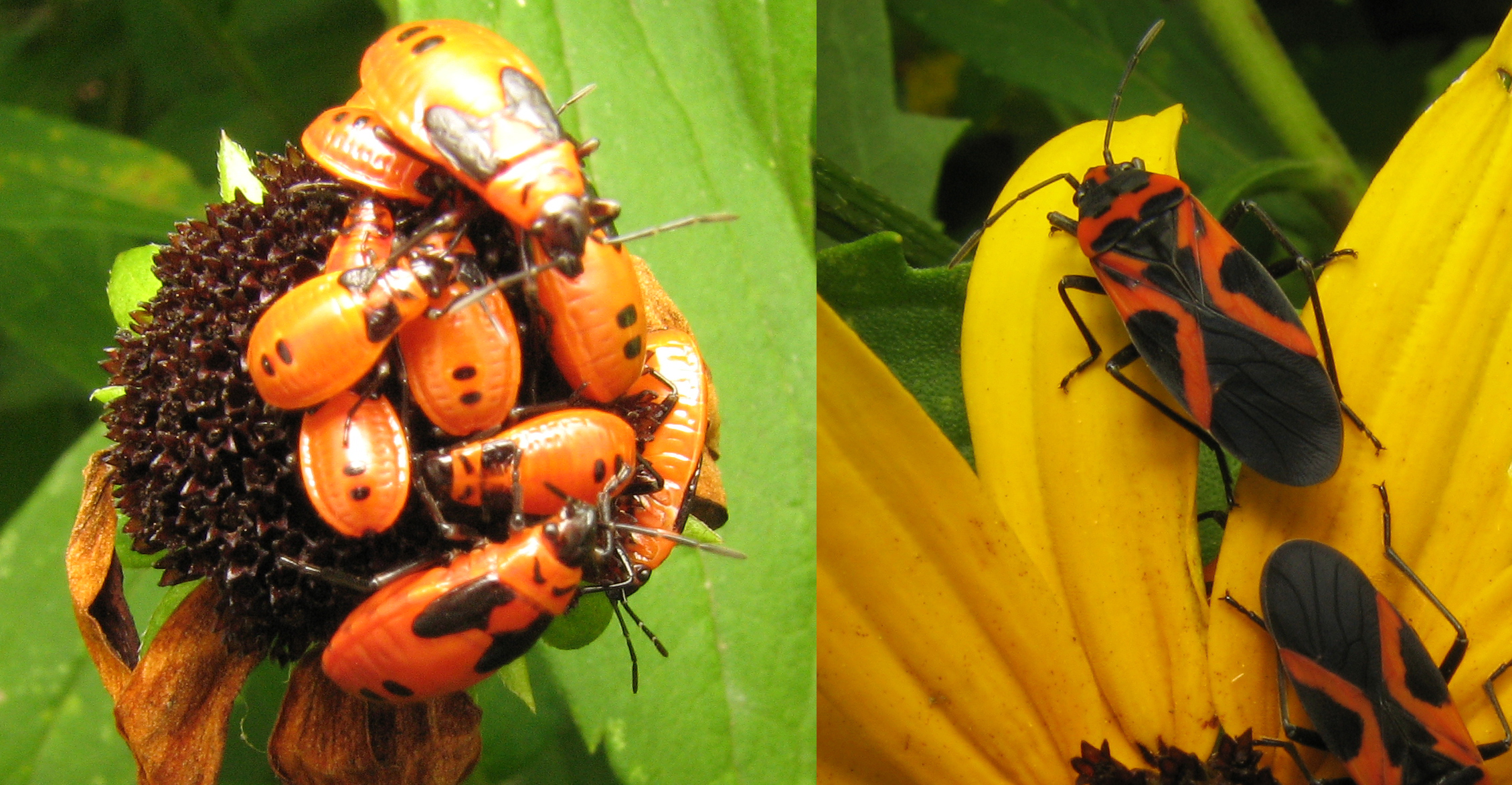
Lygaeus turcicus

== Species ==
These 69 species belong to the genus Lygaeus:

- Lygaeus alboornatus Blanchard, 1852
- Lygaeus analis Dallas, 1852
- Lygaeus argutus Brailovsky, 1982
- Lygaeus ashlocki Brailovsky, 1978
- Lygaeus bahamensis Barber & Ashlock, 1960
- Lygaeus bettoni Distant, 1901
- Lygaeus buettikeri Hamid & Hamid, 1985
- Lygaeus coccineus Barber, 1923
- Lygaeus cognatus Walker, 1872
- Lygaeus creticus Lucas, 1853
- Lygaeus cruentatus Costa, 1839
- Lygaeus dichrous Montrouzier, 1855
- Lygaeus discifer Motschulsky, 1863
- Lygaeus dives Distant, 1918
- Lygaeus dohertyi Distant, 1904
- Lygaeus equestris (Linnaeus, 1758) (black-and-red bug)
- Lygaeus flavescens Winkler & Kerzhner, 1977
- Lygaeus flavomarginatus Matsumura, 1913
- Lygaeus formosanus Shiraki, 1913
- Lygaeus froeschneri Brailovsky, 1978
- Lygaeus hanseni Jakovlev, 1883
- Lygaeus inaequalis Walker, 1872
- Lygaeus kalmii Stal, 1874 (small milkweed bug)
- Lygaeus leucospilus Walker, 1870
- Lygaeus longiusculus Walker, 1872
- Lygaeus lugubris Montrouzier, 1855
- Lygaeus mauli Faúndez, Carvajal, Diez & Raffo, 2021
- Lygaeus melanostolus (Kiritshenko, 1928)
- Lygaeus multiguttatus Herrich-Schaeffer, 1850
- Lygaeus murinus (Kiritshenko, 1913)
- Lygaeus negus Distant, 1918
- Lygaeus oppositus Brailovsky, 1978
- Lygaeus oreophilus (Kiritshenko, 1931)
- Lygaeus pallipes Wolff, 1804
- Lygaeus peruvianus Brailovsky, 1978
- Lygaeus pubicornis Fabricius, 1775
- Lygaeus quadratomaculatus Kirby, 1891
- Lygaeus reclivatus Say, 1825 (southern small milkweed bug)
- Lygaeus scabrosus Fabricius, 1775
- Lygaeus sexpustulatus (Fabricius, 1775)
- Lygaeus signatus Costa, 1862
- Lygaeus simulans Deckert, 1985
- Lygaeus sipolisi Fallou, 1891
- Lygaeus sjostedti (Lindberg, 1934)
- Lygaeus slateri Gorski, 1968
- Lygaeus taitensis Guerin, 1838
- Lygaeus teraphoides Jakovlev, 1890
- Lygaeus tristriatus Herrich-Schaeffer, 1850
- Lygaeus truculentus Stal, 1862
- Lygaeus trux Stal, 1862
- Lygaeus turcicus Fabricius, 1803 (false milkweed bug)
- Lygaeus vaccaroi Mancini, 1954
- Lygaeus vicarius Winkler & Kerzhner, 1977
- Lygaeus wangi Zheng & Zou, 1992
- † Lygaeus atavinus Heer, 1853
- † Lygaeus celasensis Theobald, 1937
- † Lygaeus dasypus Heer, 1853
- † Lygaeus dellachiaje Hope *, 1847
- † Lygaeus deprehensus Heyden, 1859
- † Lygaeus deucalionis Heer, 1853
- † Lygaeus elongatiabdominalis Theobald, 1937
- † Lygaeus faeculentus Scudder, 1890
- † Lygaeus gracilentus Forster *, 1891
- † Lygaeus gratiosus Forster *, 1891
- † Lygaeus heeri Slater, 1964
- † Lygaeus obscurellus Theobald, 1937
- † Lygaeus obsolescens Scudder, 1890
- † Lygaeus stabilitus Scudder, 1890
- † Lygaeus tinctus Heer, 1853
