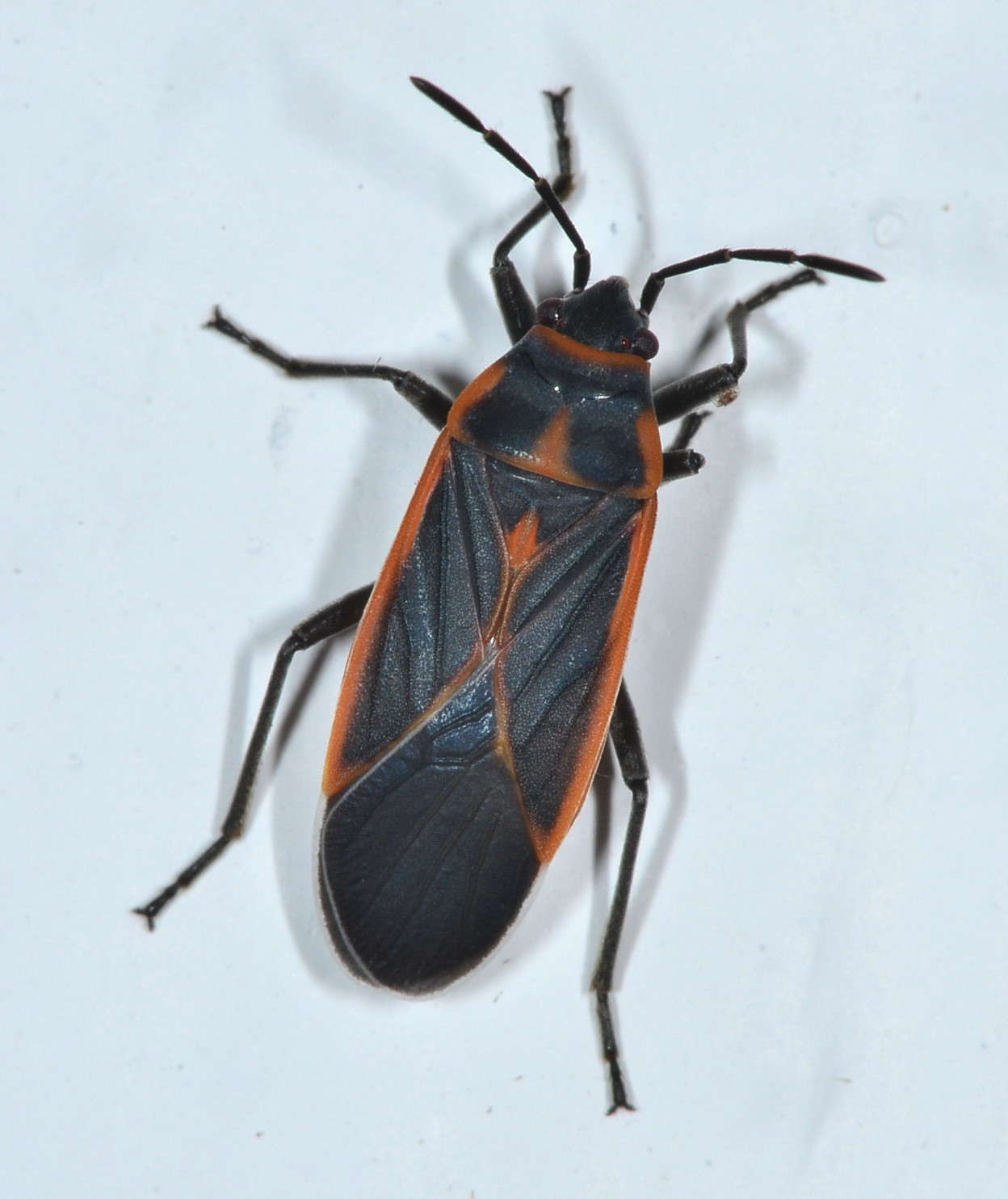
- Melacoryphus circumlitus, Mexico

Scientific classification
- Kingdom: Animalia
- Phylum: Arthropoda
- Clade: Pancrustacea
- Class: Insecta
- Order: Hemiptera
- Suborder: Heteroptera
- Family: Lygaeidae
- Subfamily: Lygaeinae
- Genus: Melacoryphus
- Species: M. circumlitus

Binomial name
- Melacoryphus circumlitus (Stal, 1862)

= Melacoryphus circumlitus =

Species of seed bug

Melacoryphus circumlitus is a species of seed bug in the family Lygaeidae, found in North and Central America.
