= Alex Slater =

American entomologist

- Born: 1945
- Occupation: Entomologist
- Parent(s): James A. Slater

James Alexander Slater II (born 1945) is an American Entomologist, specializing in Heteroptera (true bugs) in the Family Lygaeidae, who erected the genus Melacoryphus. As son of entomologist James A. Slater, in order to avoid being confused with his father, he published as Alex Slater.
