= James A. Slater =

American entomologist

James Alexander Slater
- Born: January 10, 1920; Belvidere, Illinois, US
- Died: November 2, 2008 (aged 88); Rockford, Illinois
- Education: Iowa State University (PhD); University of Illinois (BA, MS)
- Known for: Hemipterology
- Scientific career
- Fields: Entomology
- Institutions: University of Connecticut

James Alexander Slater (1920–2008) was an American zoologist and educator who served as Professor of Entomology at the University of Connecticut from 1953 to 1988. An internationally recognized expert in heteroptera (true bugs) who also studied birds and reptiles, Slater served as the Connecticut State Ornithologist and published a monograph on his research into Connecticut's historical headstones.

== Biography ==
Slater was born on January 10, 1920, in Belvidere, Illinois, to parents Ray Alvin and Gladys (Banks) Slater. He grew up in Rockford, Illinois.

Slater received his Bachelor of Arts degree in entomology from the University of Illinois Urban-Champaign in 1942. Enlisting in the United States Navy, he served in the Mediterranean and Pacific theaters during World War II, serving as a deck officer in Algeria and a malaria control officer in North Carolina and Okinawa. After departing the Navy in 1946, Slater returned to the University of Illinois to earn a Master of Science degree in 1947. He taught at Iowa State University, where he earned his PhD in entomology in 1950 and served as an assistant professor until 1953.

Slater joined the University of Connecticut faculty in 1953 and retired in 1988. He served as head of UConn's zoology and entomology departments and as head of the systematic and evolutionary biology and biological sciences group. He published more than 250 papers. He served as president of the Society of Systematic Zoology, the Connecticut Chapters of Phi Beta Kappa, the Connecticut Entomological Society, and the National Milk Glass Collectors Society. He served as editor of Entomologica Americana and held a research fellowship with the British Museum of Natural History in 1960–61. An avid bird-watcher, Slater at one point served as the Connecticut State Ornithologist. He had a lifelong fascination with herpetology.

Slater was an expert on heteropteran insects, also known as "true bugs" or "typical bugs", publishing A Catalogue of the Lygaeidae in 1964. He collected specimens of Rhyparochromidae (Heteroptera) from all over the world, including Africa, Australia, Central America, the Caribbean, and Florida. Many of these specimens are held in the Biodiversity Research Collections of the Department of Ecology and Evolutionary Biology at the University of Connecticut. He also collected milk glass and studied colonial headstones, publishing scholarship on both topics.

Slater died in Rockford on November 2, 2008, at the age of 88. He was survived by his wife, Elizabeth, and four children: James Alexander Slater II (also an entomologist; known as Alex), Jacquely, Samuel, and Lydia.

== Bibliography ==
- Slater, James A.; Schuh, Randall T. (1995). True Bugs of the World (Hemiptera: Heteroptera): Classification and Natural History. Ithaca, NY: Cornell University Press. ISBN 9780801420665.
- Slater, James A. (1995). A Catalogue of the Lygaeidae of the World (1960–1994). New York: New York Entomological Society. ISBN 0913424161.
- Slater, James A.; Baranowski, Richard M. (1990). Lygaeidae of Florida (Hemiptera: Heteroptera). Gainesville, Florida: Florida Department of Agriculture and Consumer Services.
- Slater, James A. (1987). The Colonial Gravestones of Eastern Connecticut and the Men Who Made Them. Hamden, CT: Archon Books. ISBN 9780208021601.
- Slater, James A.; Baranowski, Richard M. (1978). How to Know the True Bugs (Hemiptera-Heteroptera). Dubuque, Iowa: W.C. Brown. ISBN 9780697048943.
