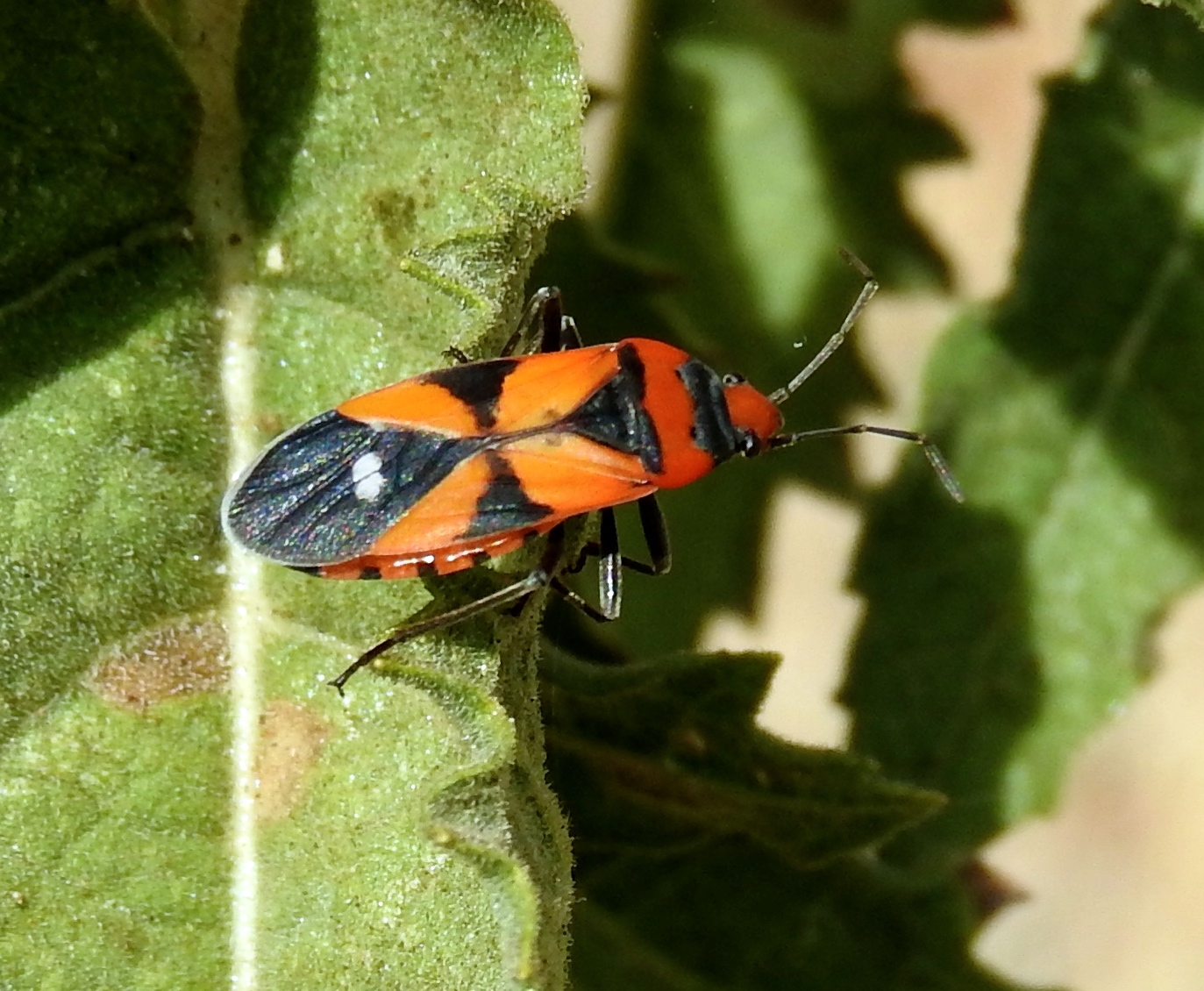
- Lygaeus analis, México

Scientific classification
- Domain: Eukaryota
- Kingdom: Animalia
- Phylum: Arthropoda
- Class: Insecta
- Order: Hemiptera
- Suborder: Heteroptera
- Family: Lygaeidae
- Subfamily: Lygaeinae
- Genus: Lygaeus
- Species: L. analis

Binomial name
- Lygaeus analis Dallas, 1852

= Lygaeus analis =

Species of true bug

Lygaeus analis is a species of seed bug in the family Lygaeidae, found in Mexico, Central America, and tropical South America.
