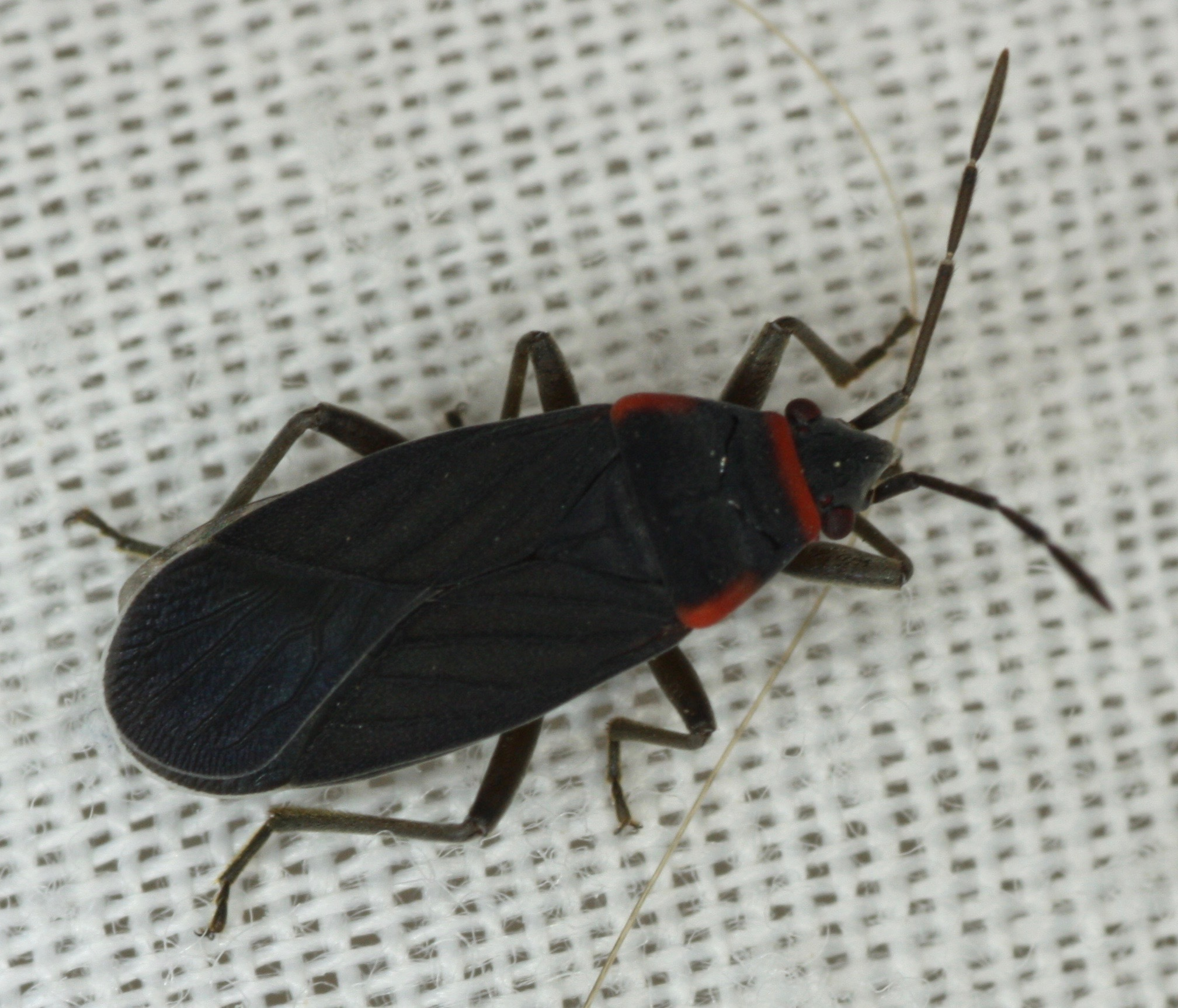
- Melacoryphus rubicollis, Arizona

Scientific classification
- Domain: Eukaryota
- Kingdom: Animalia
- Phylum: Arthropoda
- Class: Insecta
- Order: Hemiptera
- Suborder: Heteroptera
- Family: Lygaeidae
- Subfamily: Lygaeinae
- Genus: Melacoryphus
- Species: M. rubicollis

Binomial name
- Melacoryphus rubicollis (Uhler, 1894)

= Melacoryphus rubicollis =

Species of seed bug

Melacoryphus rubicollis is a species of seed bug in the family Lygaeidae, found in the southwestern United States and Mexico.
