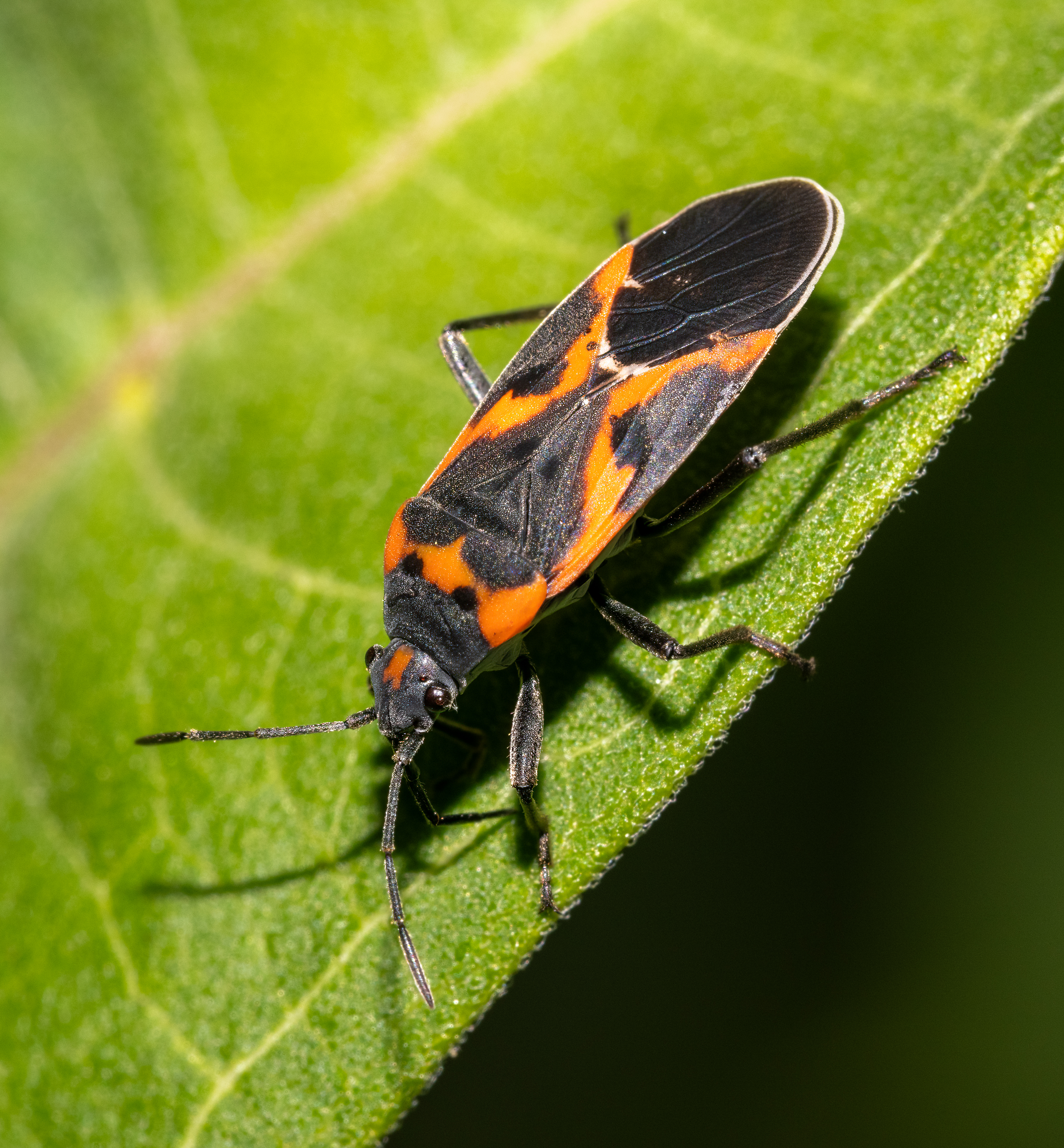

Scientific classification
- Kingdom: Animalia
- Phylum: Arthropoda
- Clade: Pancrustacea
- Class: Insecta
- Order: Hemiptera
- Suborder: Heteroptera
- Family: Lygaeidae
- Genus: Lygaeus
- Species: L. kalmii

Binomial name
- Lygaeus kalmii Stål, 1874

= Lygaeus kalmii =

Species of true bug

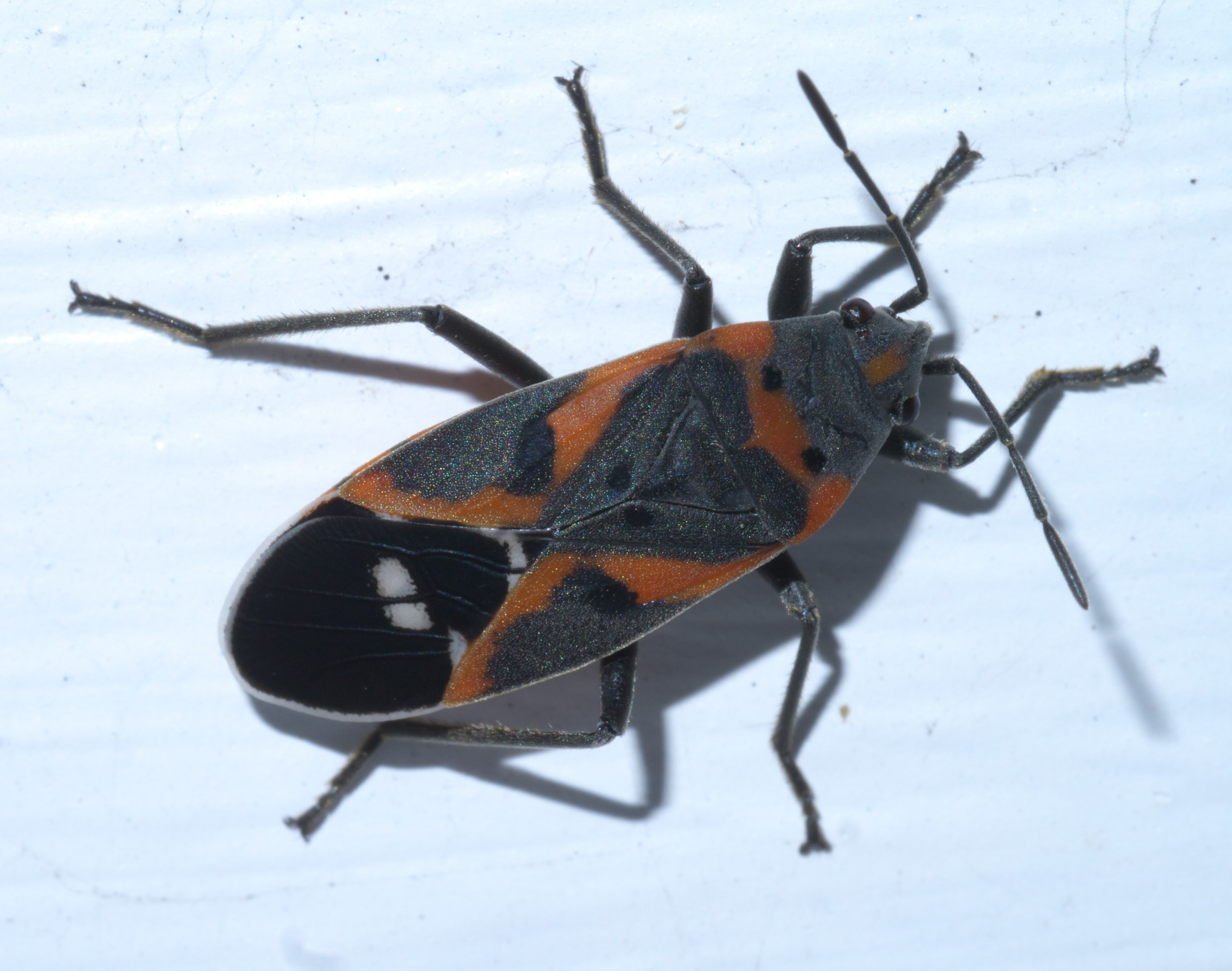
Adult Lygaeus kalmii

Lygaeus kalmii, known as the small milkweed bug or common milkweed bug, is a species of seed bug in the family Lygaeidae. It is found in Central and North America.

== Taxonomy ==
Lygaeus kalmii was first formally named in 1874 by Swedish entomologist Carl Stål in his Enumeratio Hemipterorum.

There are two recognized subspecies:

- Lygaeus kalmii angustomarginatus Parshley, 1919 – eastern small milkweed bug
- Lygaeus kalmii kalmii Stal, 1874 – western small milkweed bug. Range includes Arizona (where it is very common in almost every sandy-grassy patch) and California, though California milkweed bugs are somewhat rare. The western subspecies has white spots and are seen with milkweed in bushy dry areas, but only for feeding, and in wet areas to survive.

== Description ==
Young nymphs of Lygaeus kalmii are initially fully red, developing black diagonal markings on the pronotum. Adults are orange to red and gray/black, reaching 10 to 12 mm (0.39 to 0.47 in) in length. The head is black with a red spot in the center. The forewings are patterned with a black heart inside of an orange-red X which does not meet in the middle.

The membranous portion of the forewings in the eastern subspecies Lygaeus kalmii angustomarginatus has a narrow white margin, while that of the western L. k. kalmii has white spots and a broader margin.

The small milkweed bug is commonly confused with other black and red or orange insects, including Oncopeltus fasciatus, Lygaeus turcicus, and Lygaeus reclivatus.

== Distribution and reproduction ==
Lygaeus kalmii angustomarginatus is found in north temperate regions of North America and is not a migratory insect. Only adults overwinter and they do not begin reproduction until the following April. Females are receptive to males in all seasons. The eggs are laid on milkweed (Asclepias spp.) in the spring.

== Diet ==
Small milkweed bugs' primary sources of nutrients are flower nectar and milkweed seeds. If these food sources are limited, they may feed on other insects.
