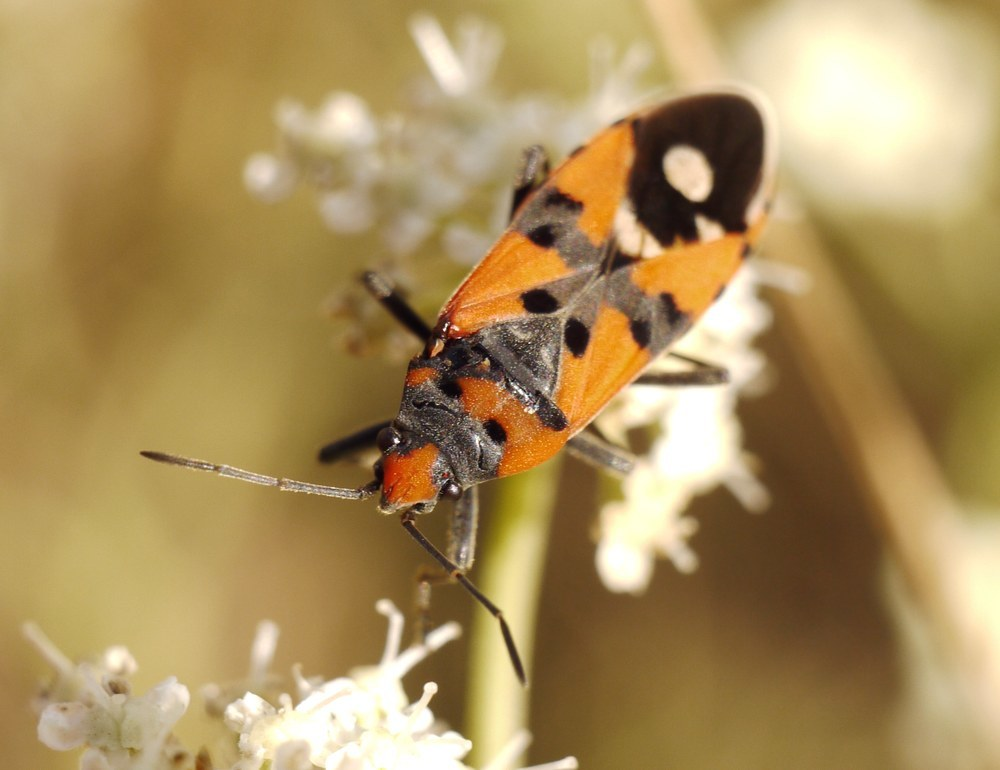
- Lygaeus simulans, Ukraine

Scientific classification
- Kingdom: Animalia
- Phylum: Arthropoda
- Class: Insecta
- Order: Hemiptera
- Suborder: Heteroptera
- Family: Lygaeidae
- Subfamily: Lygaeinae
- Genus: Lygaeus
- Species: L. simulans

Binomial name
- Lygaeus simulans Deckert, 1985

= Lygaeus simulans =

Species of seed bug

Lygaeus simulans is a species of seed bug in the family Lygaeidae, found in the Palearctic.

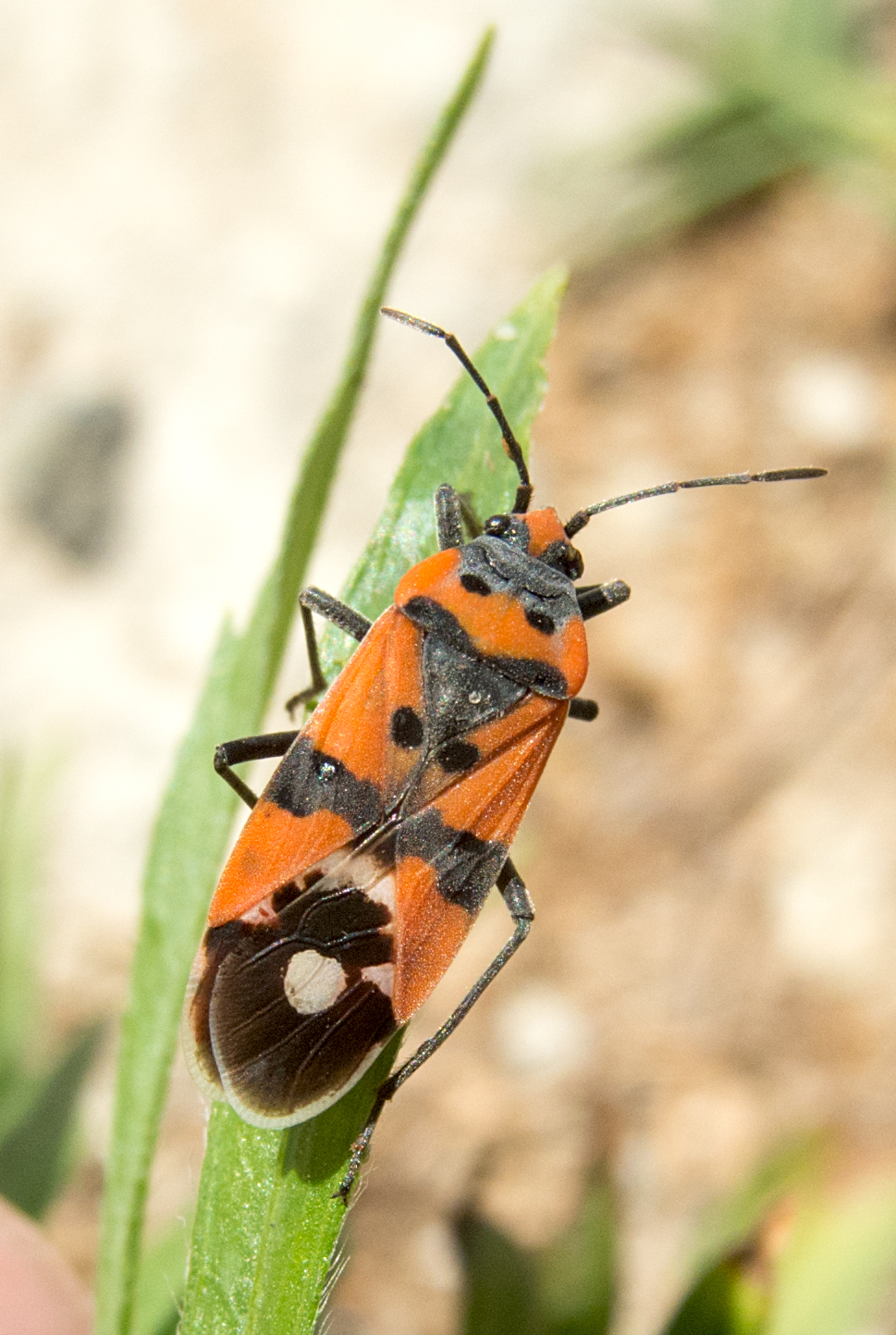
Lygaeus simulans, Bulgaria
