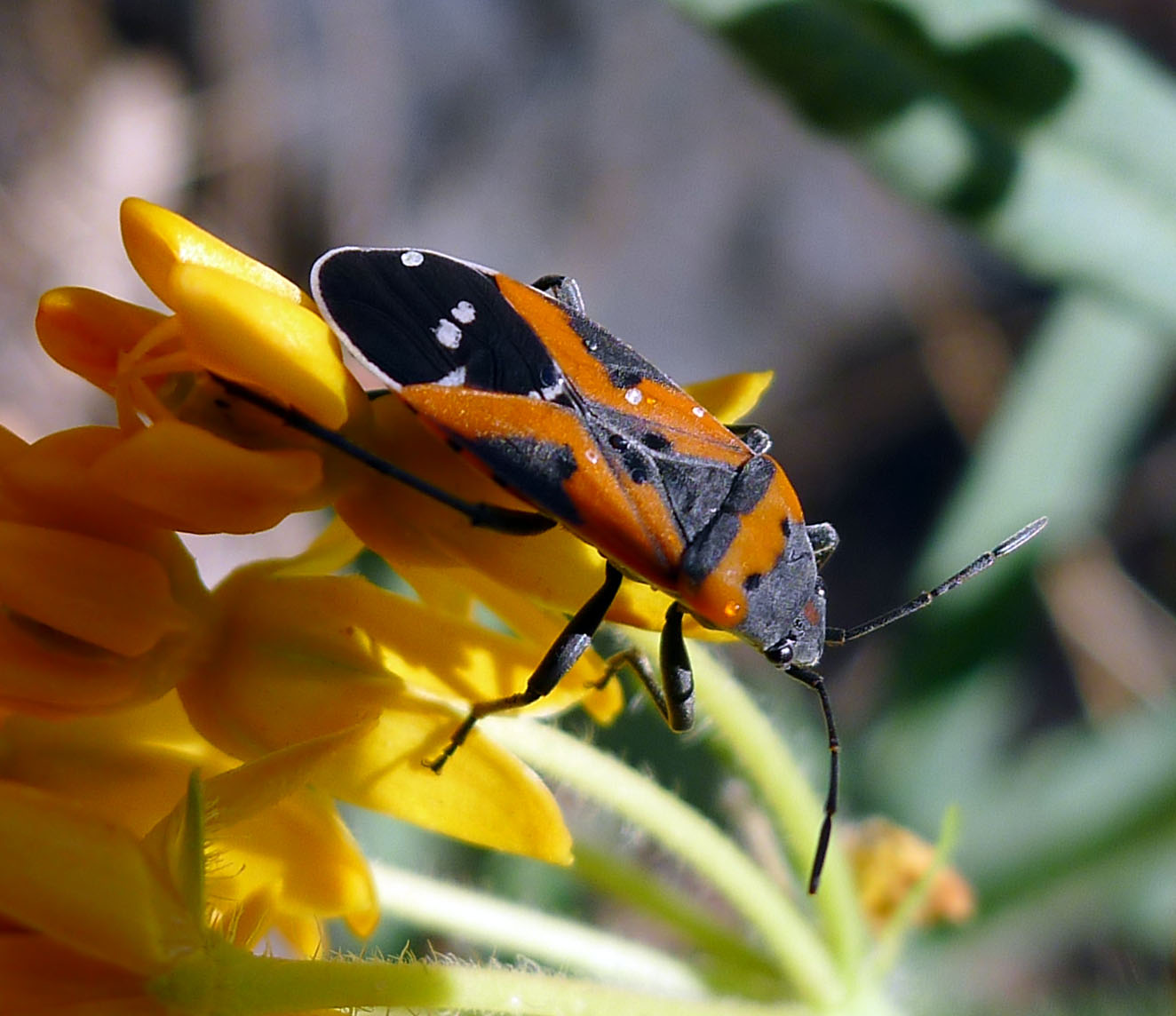

Scientific classification
- Domain: Eukaryota
- Kingdom: Animalia
- Phylum: Arthropoda
- Class: Insecta
- Order: Hemiptera
- Suborder: Heteroptera
- Family: Lygaeidae
- Genus: Lygaeus
- Species: L. reclivatus

Binomial name
- Lygaeus reclivatus Say, 1825

= Lygaeus reclivatus =

Species of true bug

Lygaeus reclivatus is a species of seed bug in the family Lygaeidae. It is found in Central America and North America.

== Subspecies ==
These two subspecies belong to the species Lygaeus reclivatus:

- Lygaeus reclivatus enotus Say, 1831
- Lygaeus reclivatus reclivatus Say, 1825
