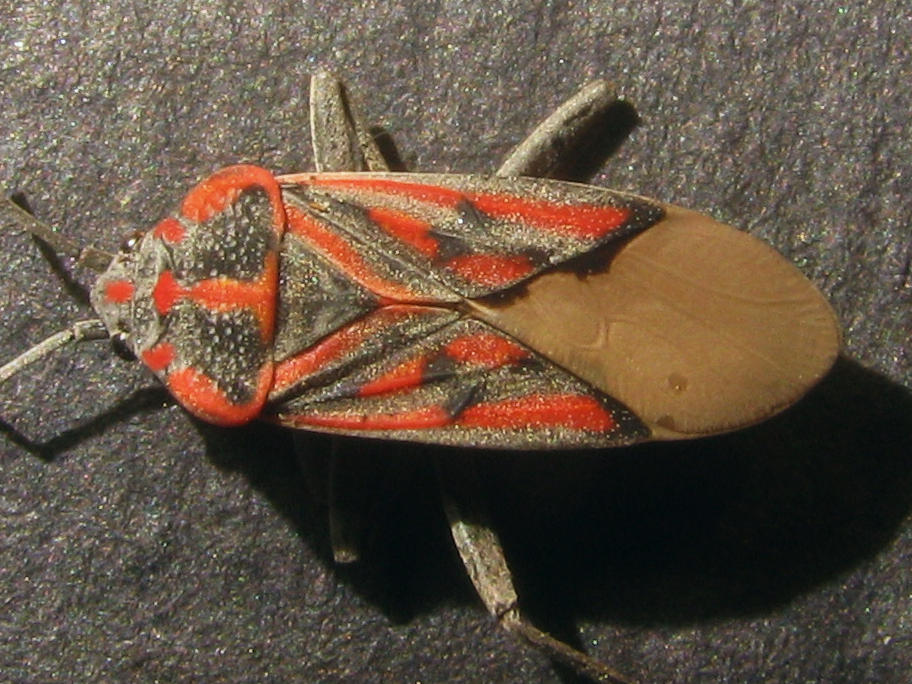

Scientific classification
- Domain: Eukaryota
- Kingdom: Animalia
- Phylum: Arthropoda
- Class: Insecta
- Order: Hemiptera
- Suborder: Heteroptera
- Family: Lygaeidae
- Subfamily: Lygaeinae
- Genus: Spilostethus
- Species: S. crudelis

Binomial name
- Spilostethus crudelis Fabricius, 1781

= Spilostethus crudelis =

Species of true bug

Spilostethus crudelis is a species of seed bug in the family Lygaeidae, found in southern Africa.

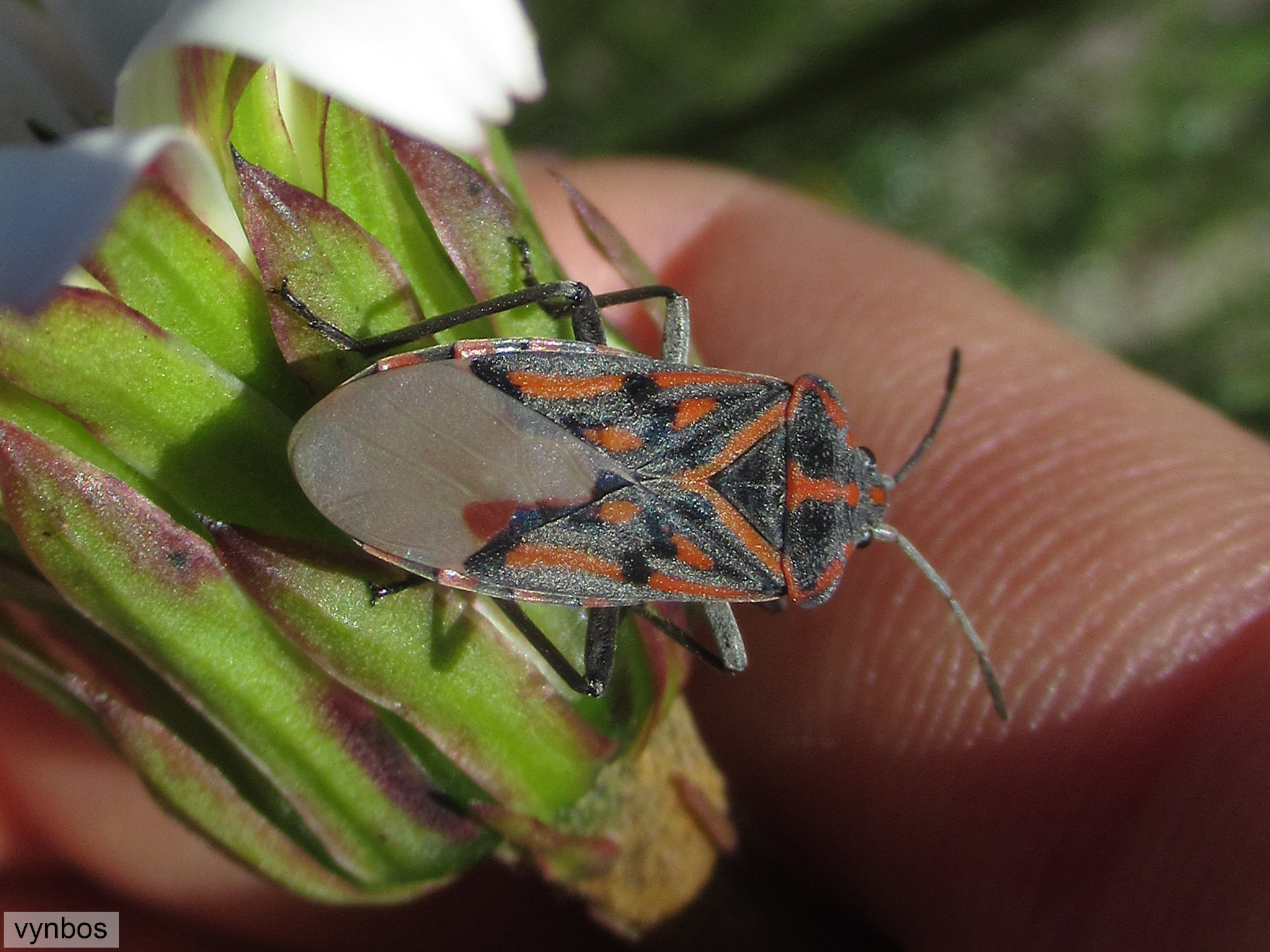
Spilostethus crudelis, South Africa
