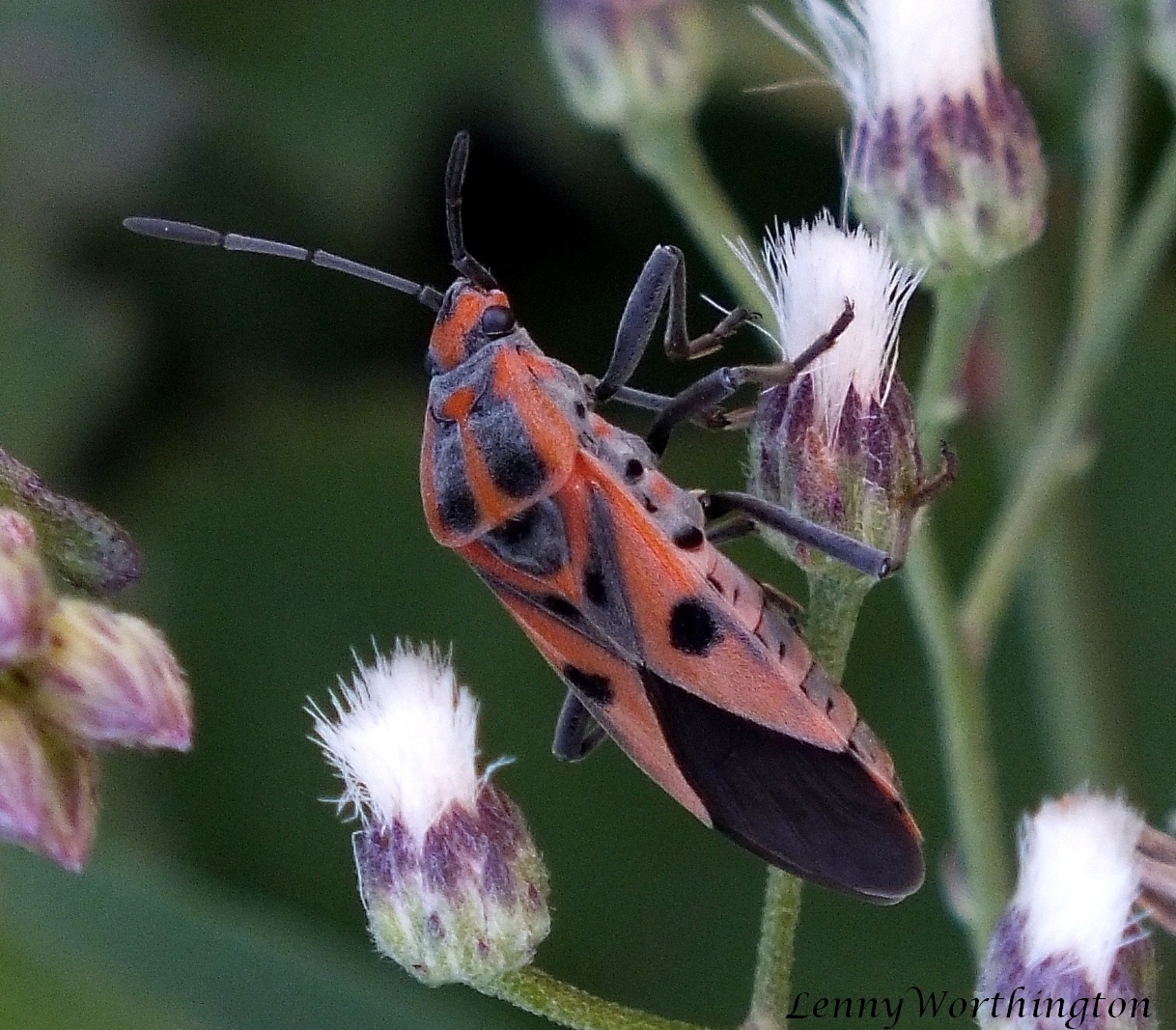

Scientific classification
- Kingdom: Animalia
- Phylum: Arthropoda
- Clade: Pancrustacea
- Class: Insecta
- Order: Hemiptera
- Suborder: Heteroptera
- Family: Lygaeidae
- Genus: Spilostethus
- Species: S. hospes

Binomial name
- Spilostethus hospes (Fabricius, 1794)

= Spilostethus hospes =

Species of insect

Spilostethus hospes is a species of seed bug found in Asia, Australasia, and Oceania. It is sometimes referred to as the milkweed bug in Australia because it feeds on milkweed plants, however the large milkweed bug refers to a different species - Oncopelltus fasciatus. The two bugs both fall under the family of Lygaeidae and exhibit similar markings and behaviours. Large milkweed bugs however, are found in North America. The distribution of the two bugs, and respective differing taxonomies suggest they are different species.

== Taxonomy ==
Spilostethus hospes falls under the order of Hemiptera – ‘true bugs’. They are unique amongst insects in having their mouthparts formed into a piercing beak or 'rostrum', used to suck juices from plants or other animals. The bug falls under the family Lygaeidae, which are distinguished by their oval or elongate shape, and impunctate bodies. All bugs in this family are either dark brown or brightly coloured, and like many others of the subfamily Lygaeinae, S. hospes has distinct red/orange markings, as well as four segmented antennae.

== Ecology ==
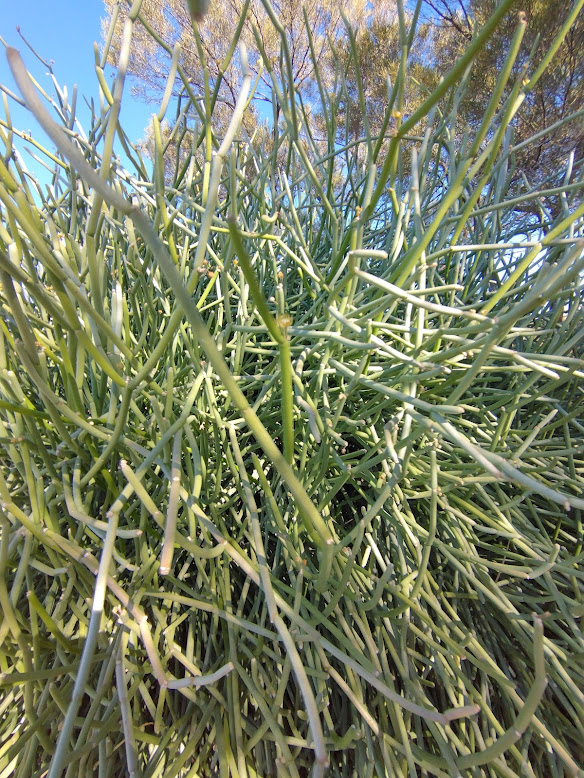
Caustic vine plant found in Sturt National Park, a common host plant

Spilostethus hospes feeds on a series of plant organs including leaves, stems, fruits and seeds. In Australia, they are often observed feeding on red-headed cotton bush (Asclepias currasavica), caustic vine (Sarcostemma viminale), and swan plants (Asclepias fruiticosa and Gomphocarpus physocarpus). Plant feeding causes a decline in the vitality and productivity of the plant. This can lead to stunted growth, wilting and potential reduction of yield of the host plant. S. hospes can communicate with others of its kind using vibrations conducted through plant stems and leaves, a behaviour not evident to the naked eye.

To date, only one population of S. hospes has been identified to carry a male-killing endosymbiotic bacterium. This bacteria has been shown to only kill males in this population, which may be one of the reasons that show a higher frequency of females.

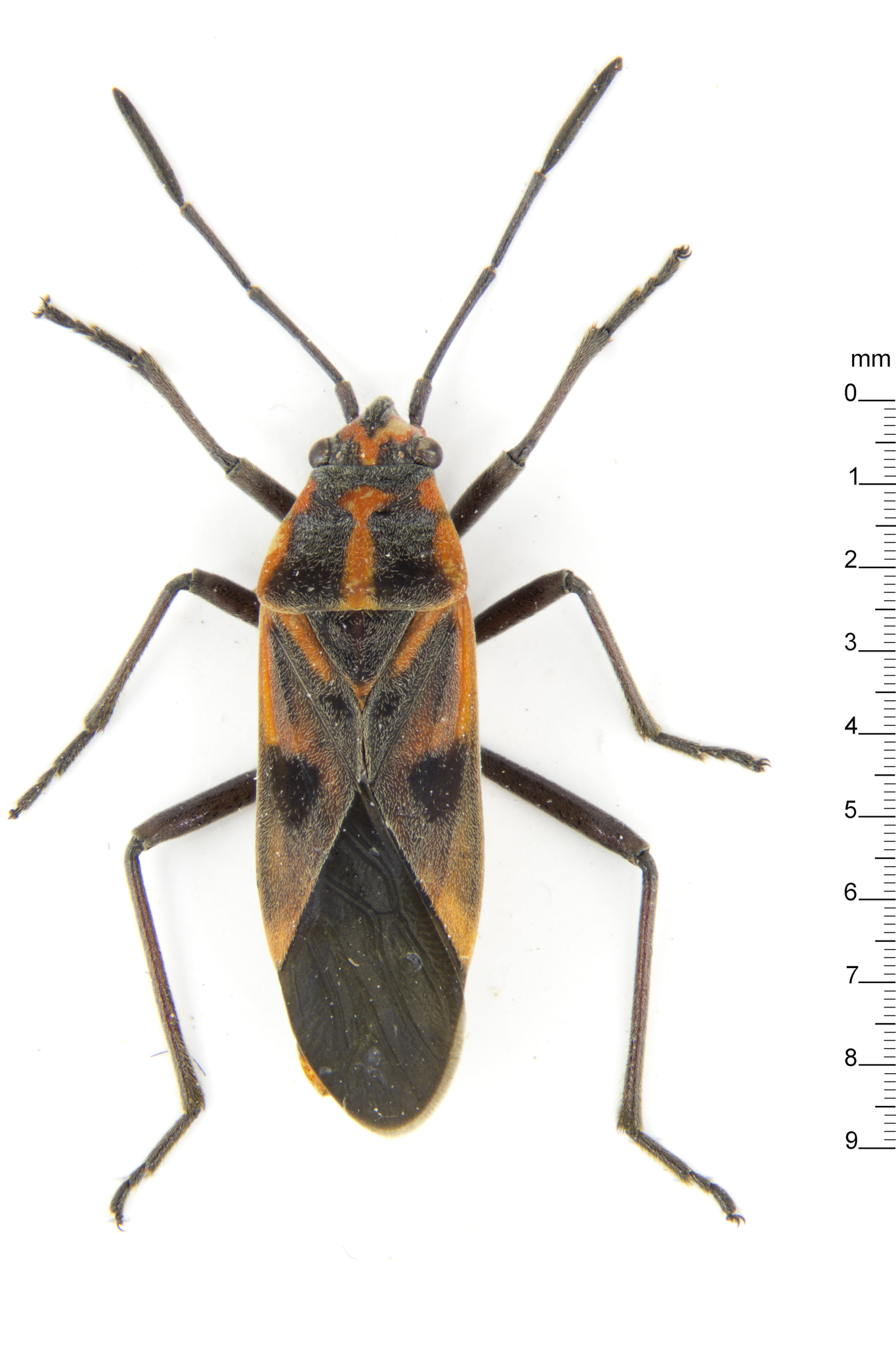
Adult S. hospes

== Description ==
Spilostethus hospes exhibits a red and black patterns on their back - a warning to the would-be predators that they are toxic. The patterns can vary quite a bit in different individuals. The bug is between 11 and 13 mm long at full maturity.

== Lifecycle ==
Spilostethus hospes go through simple metamorphosis. Their life process has three stages:

Egg: Eggs are laid in distinctly shaped clusters that camouflage with the environment. These eggs serve as the protective encasing for the developing insect.

Nymph: Upon hatching, young nymphs resembles a miniature adult, but lacking in developed wings and functional reproductive organs.

Adult: The nymph grows into a fully grown adult bug. This change is made evident by the bugs shell being harder and more colorful, thus signaling maturity and readiness for reproduction.

Different nymphal stages can be observed on a host plant during summer.

== Habitat and distribution ==
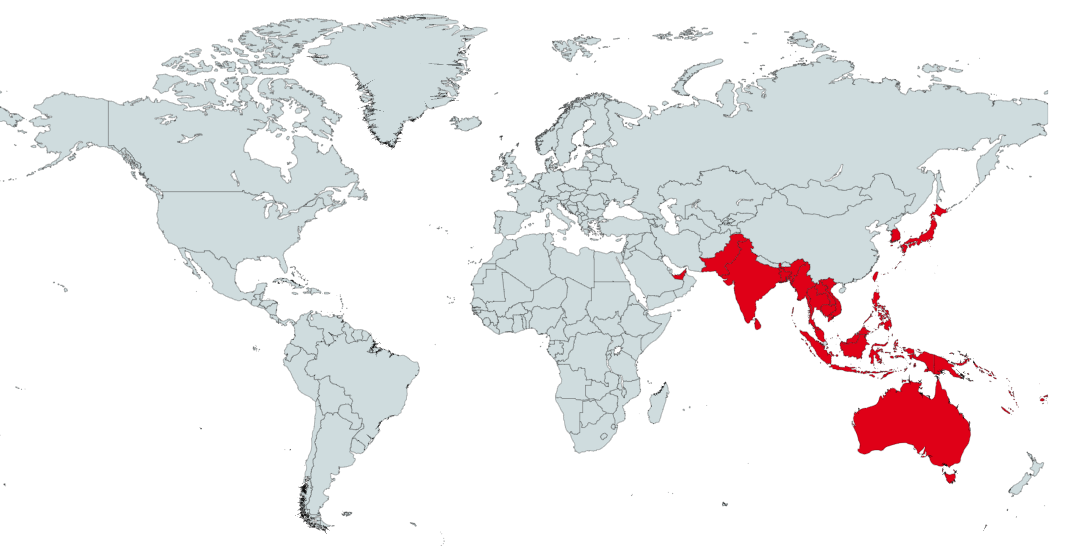
Global distribution as defined by iNaturalist observations

The distribution of S. hospes can be seen in the map to the right, based data from iNaturalist. It usually is found in similar climates to tropical rain forests, and is often seen feeding on plants in a range of habitats from forests and fields, to open plains and shrub-lands. The conservation status of the species is unknown.
