= Spilostethus trilineatus =

Scientific classification
- Domain: Eukaryota
- Kingdom: Animalia
- Phylum: Arthropoda
- Class: Insecta
- Order: Hemiptera
- Suborder: Heteroptera
- Family: Lygaeidae
- Subfamily: Lygaeinae
- Genus: Spilostethus
- Species: S. trilineatus

Binomial name
- Spilostethus trilineatus (Fabricius, 1794)

Species of true bug

Spilostethus trilineatus is a species of seed bug in the family Lygaeidae, found in Africa and India.
