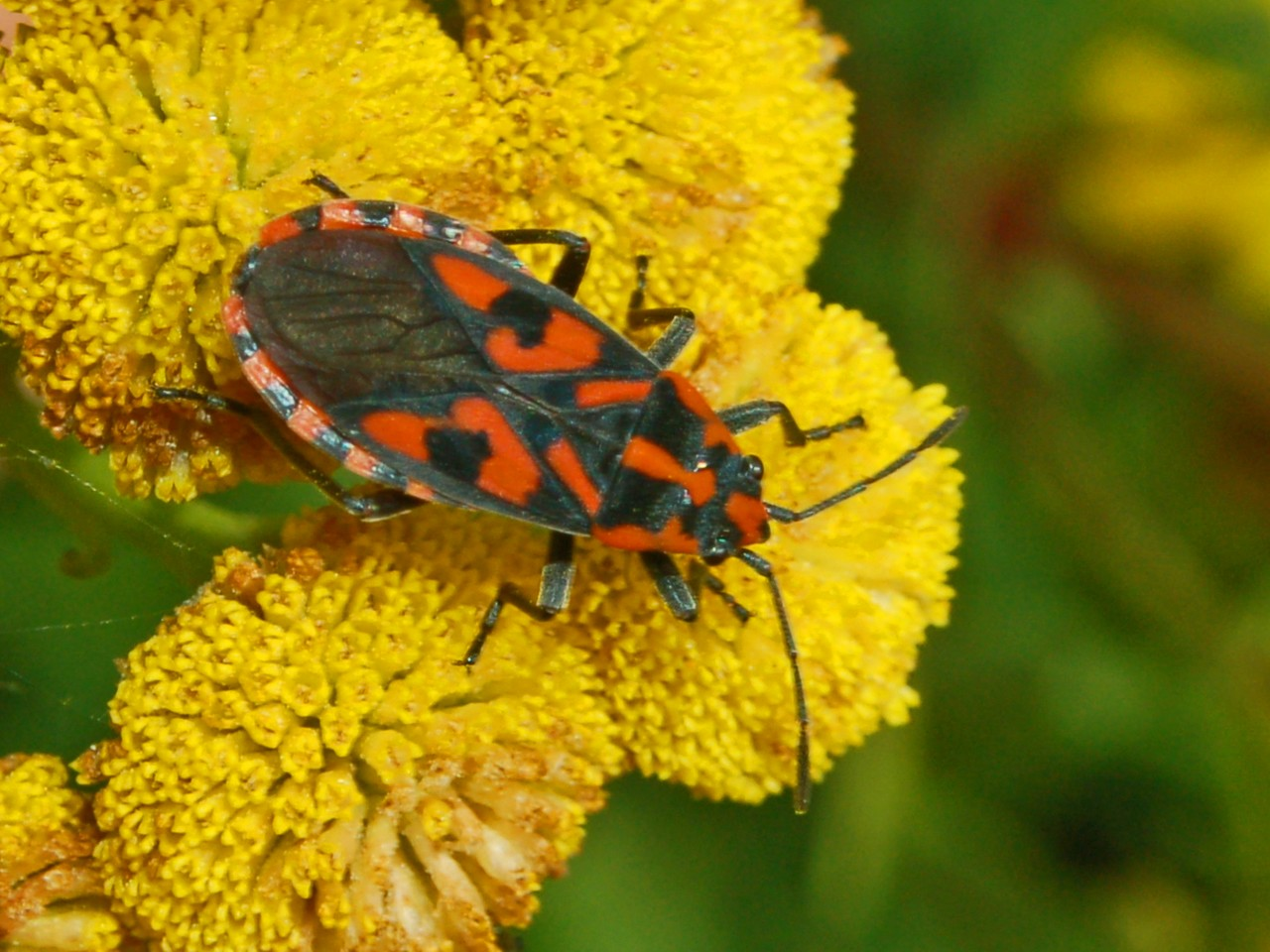
- Adult

Scientific classification
- Kingdom: Animalia
- Phylum: Arthropoda
- Class: Insecta
- Order: Hemiptera
- Suborder: Heteroptera
- Family: Lygaeidae
- Genus: Spilostethus
- Species: S. saxatilis

Binomial name
- Spilostethus saxatilis (Scopoli, 1763)

Synonyms
- Lygaeus saxatilis Scopoli, 1763

= Spilostethus saxatilis =

Species of true bug

Spilostethus saxatilis is a species of bugs belonging to the family Lygaeidae, subfamily Lygaeinae.

== Distribution ==
This species can be found in the Euro-Mediterranean-Turanian Region, with a more northern distribution relative to Spilostethus pandurus, at least as far east as Iran.

It is present in most of Europe (Albania, Austria, Bulgaria, Croatia, Czech Republic, France, Germany, Greece, Hungary, Italy, Poland, Portugal, Romania, Russia, Serbia, Slovakia, Slovenia, Spain, Switzerland, Turkey, Ukraine), and in the Oriental realm.

== Habitat ==
These bugs prefer warm, dry open areas, meadows and fields. They can also be seen on the rocks (hence the species name saxatilis, which is derived from the Latin word saxum, meaning rock).

== Description ==
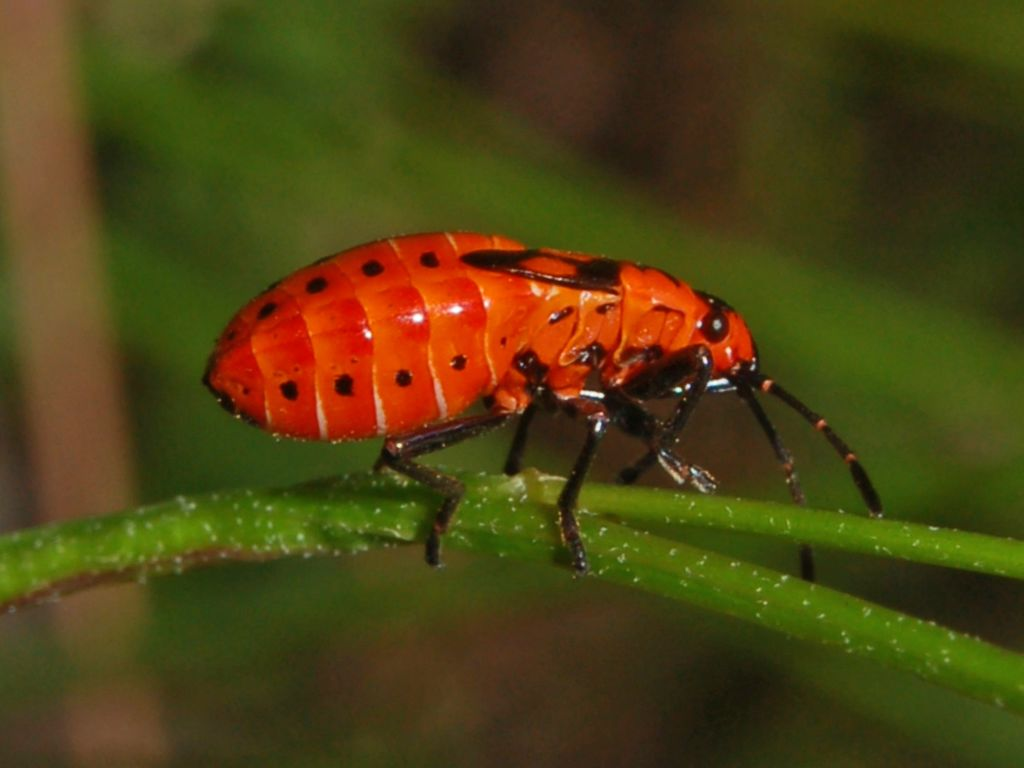
Spilostethus saxatilis nymph

Spilostethus saxatilis can reach a length of 8.5–12.5 millimetres (0.33–0.49 in). Bodies of these bugs are characterized by black and red markings of different shapes. Pronotum is red, with two broad, irregularly shaped longitudinal black stripes. The hemilytra have black and red markings, while the membrane is black, without white spot. The outer edge of the corium is black. The connexivum is alternately red and black colored. Antennae and legs are black.

== Biology ==
These polyphagous bugs feed on seeds and juices of various plants, especially Aspleniaceae, Asteraceae and Apiaceae. Spilostethus saxatilis is a univoltine species. The mating takes place in May and June. The new adult generation will appear in August. Adults overwinter.
