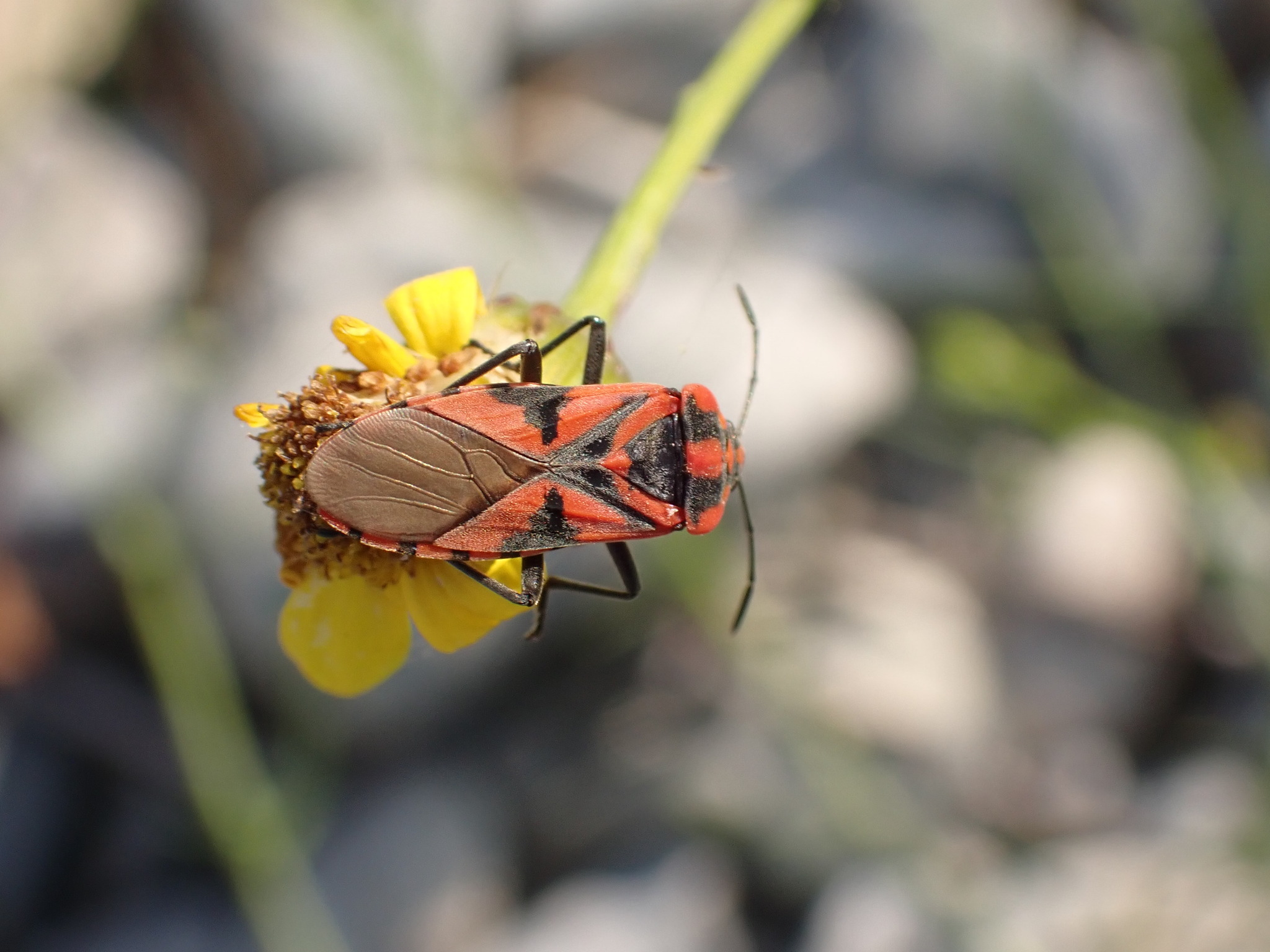
- In France

Scientific classification
- Kingdom: Animalia
- Phylum: Arthropoda
- Clade: Pancrustacea
- Class: Insecta
- Order: Hemiptera
- Suborder: Heteroptera
- Family: Lygaeidae
- Genus: Spilostethus
- Species: S. furcula

Binomial name
- Spilostethus furcula (Herrich-Schaeffer, 1850)

= Spilostethus furcula =

Species of seed bug

Spilostethus furcula is a species of seed bug in the family Lygaeidae, found in Africa, Europe, and the Middle East.
