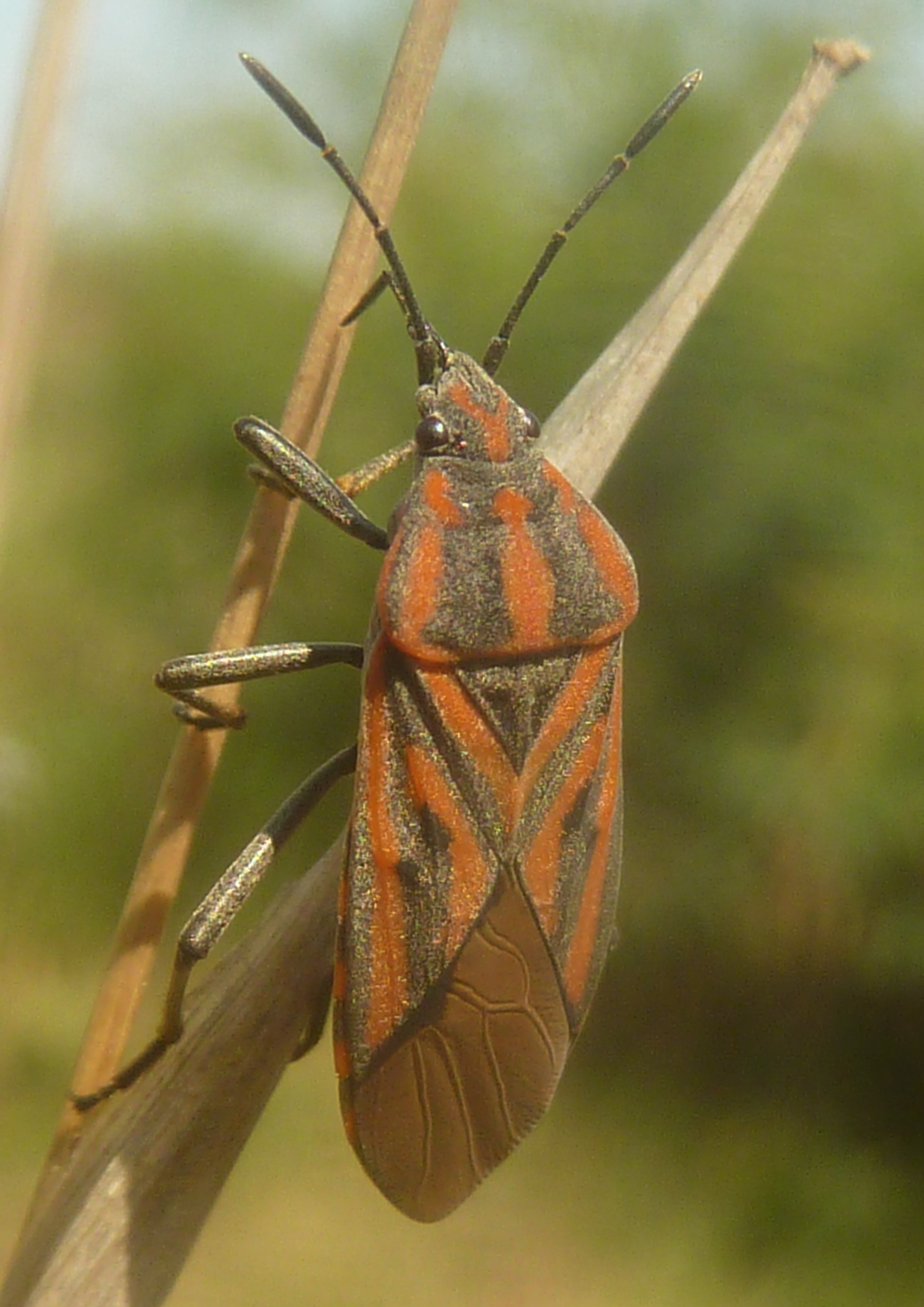
- Adult

Scientific classification
- Domain: Eukaryota
- Kingdom: Animalia
- Phylum: Arthropoda
- Class: Insecta
- Order: Hemiptera
- Suborder: Heteroptera
- Family: Lygaeidae
- Genus: Spilostethus
- Species: S. rivularis

Binomial name
- Spilostethus rivularis (Germar, 1837)

= Spilostethus rivularis =

Species of true bug

Spilostethus rivularis, the rivulet milkweed bug, is a species of bug belonging to the family Lygaeidae sensu stricto, and subfamily Lygaeinae. It is widely distributed in Africa, where it is found commonly in grassland, savannah grassland or croplands.

== Description ==
The egg and instars were described by Slater and Perry (1973). The nymph is conspicuously coloured yellow-orange to orange, and striped with brown. Adults measure about 13 mm in length, and are conspicuously barred rufous and greyish black on the head, pronotum and hard parts (i.e. clavus and corium) of the hemelytra. The scutellum is blackish and the membranes of the hemelytra are chestnut brown.

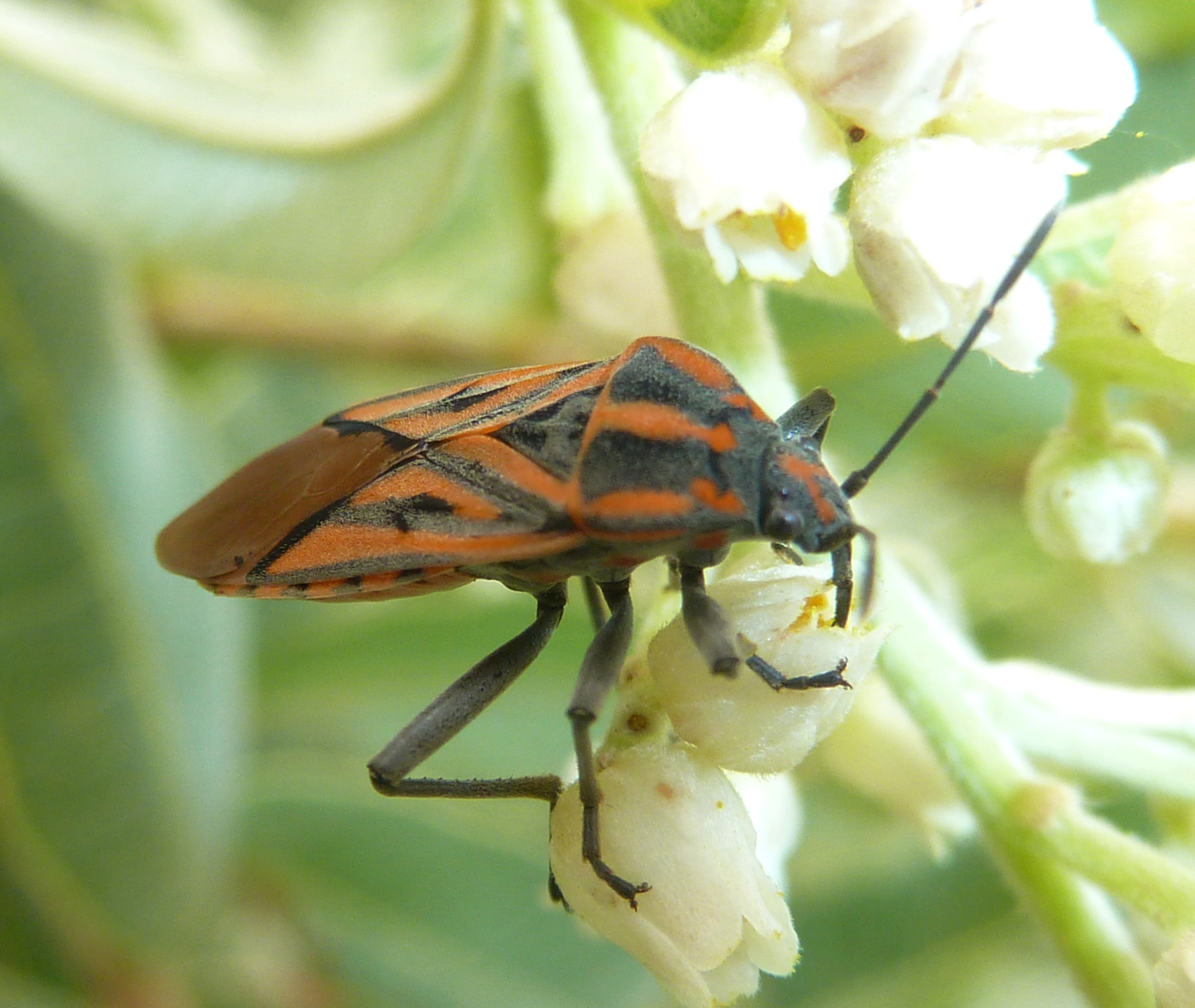
Adult feeding on Ozoroa nectar

== Biology ==
Members of its genus feed on the seeds of various milkweed species, related Calotropis spp., and afrotropical Solanum spp. They may also be found on the flower heads of various composite plants, and S. rivularis has been noted to congregate on Lopholaena coriifolia in South Africa. The present species has been recorded on cotton and sorghum (nymphs and adults) in Nigeria, cotton in Mozambique, and on Hibiscus, cotton and sweet potato in the DRC.
