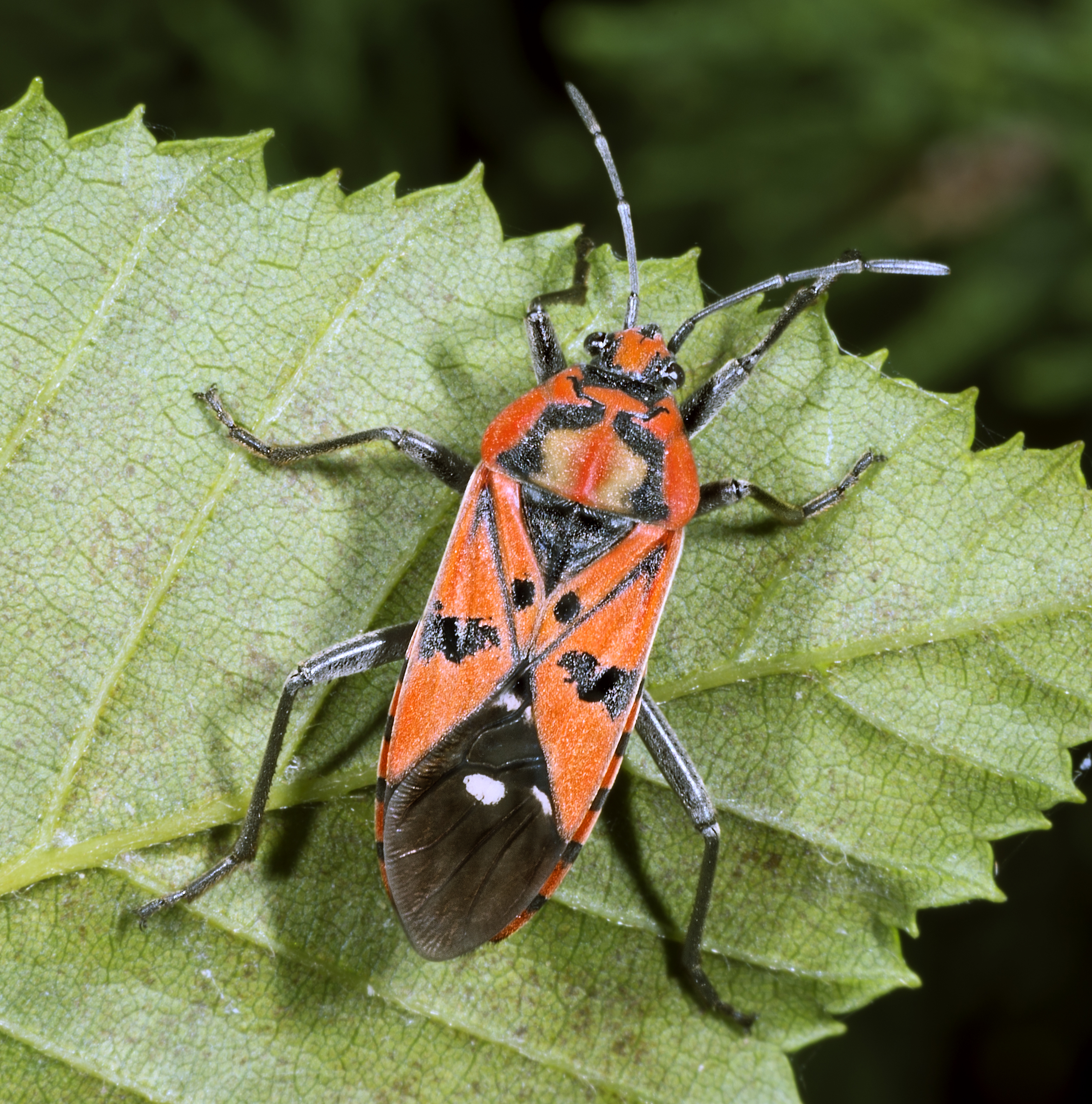
- Spilostethus pandurus

Scientific classification
- Kingdom: Animalia
- Phylum: Arthropoda
- Clade: Pancrustacea
- Class: Insecta
- Order: Hemiptera
- Suborder: Heteroptera
- Superfamily: Lygaeoidea
- Family: Lygaeidae
- Subfamily: Lygaeinae
- Genus: Spilostethus; Stål, 1868

= Spilostethus =

Genus of true bugs

Spilostethus is a genus of bugs in the family Lygaeidae (seed bugs). Most species in this genus are from the Palearctic and Oriental regions.

== Species ==
These species belong to the genus Spilostethus:

1. Spilostethus altivolens Linnavuori, 1978
2. Spilostethus amaenus (Bolivar, 1879)
3. Spilostethus campbelli (Distant, 1918)
4. Spilostethus consanguineus (Montandon, 1893)
5. Spilostethus crudelis Fabricius, 1781
6. Spilostethus decoratus (Stål, 1867)
7. Spilostethus furcula (Herrich-Schaeffer, 1850)
8. Spilostethus hospes (Fabricius, 1794) (darth maul bug)
9. Spilostethus lemniscatus (Stål, 1855)
10. Spilostethus longiceps Linnavuori, 1978
11. Spilostethus longulus (Dallas, 1852)
12. Spilostethus macilentus Stål, 1874
13. Spilostethus merui Scudder, 1962
14. Spilostethus mimus (Stål, 1865)
15. Spilostethus montislunae Bergroth, 1914
16. Spilostethus nasalis (Gerstaecker, 1873)
17. Spilostethus pacificus (Boisduval, 1835)
18. Spilostethus pandurus (Scopoli, 1763)
  type species (as Cimex militaris Fabricius JC = S. pandurus militaris) - Europe
19. Spilostethus rivularis (Germar, 1837) (brooklet milkweed bug)
20. Spilostethus rubriceps (Horvath, 1899)
21. Spilostethus saxatilis (Scopoli, 1763)
22. Spilostethus stehliki Deckert, 2013
23. Spilostethus taeniatus (Stål, 1865)
24. Spilostethus trilineatus (Fabricius, 1794)
