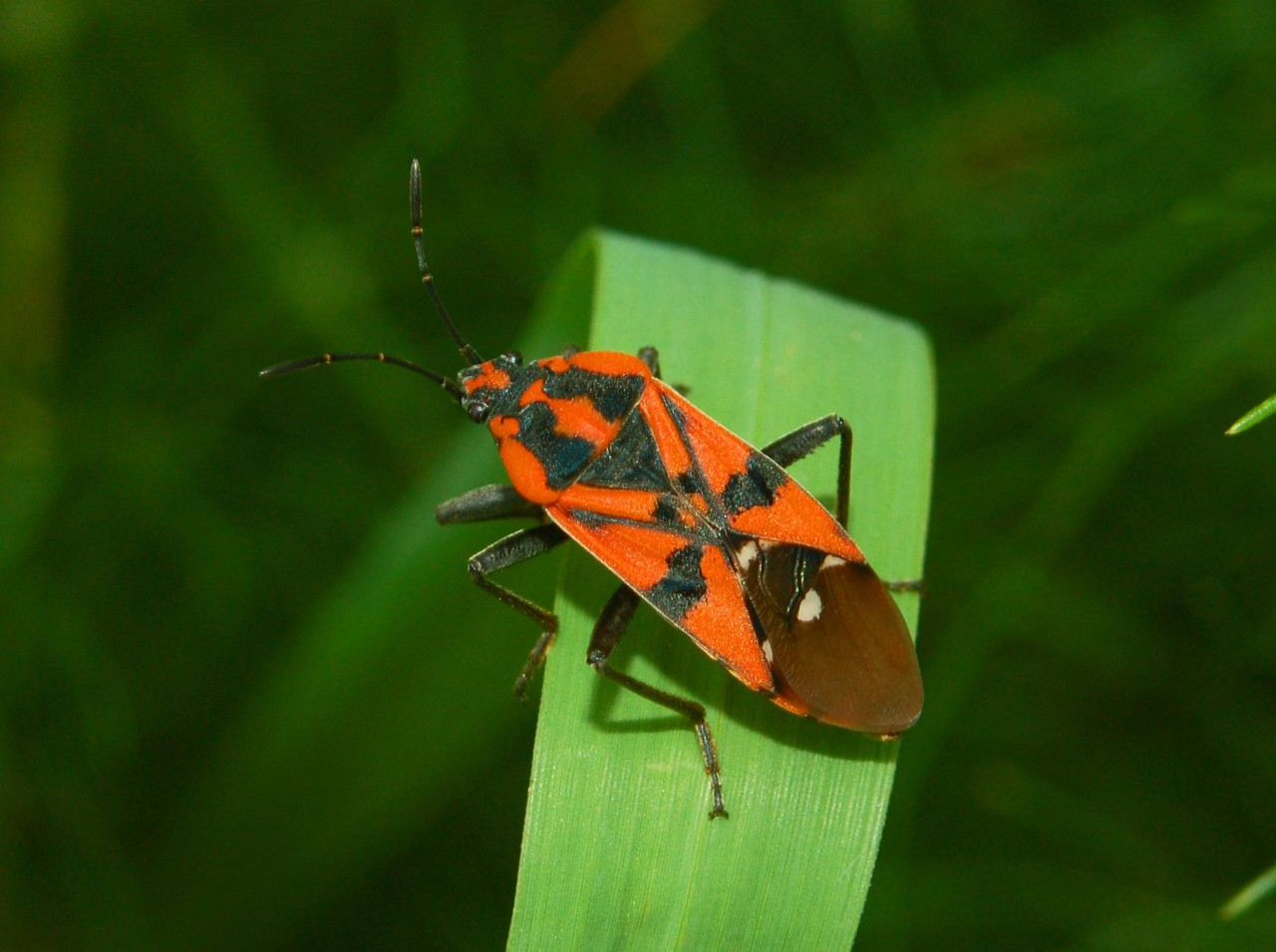
- Spilostethus pandurus, upperside
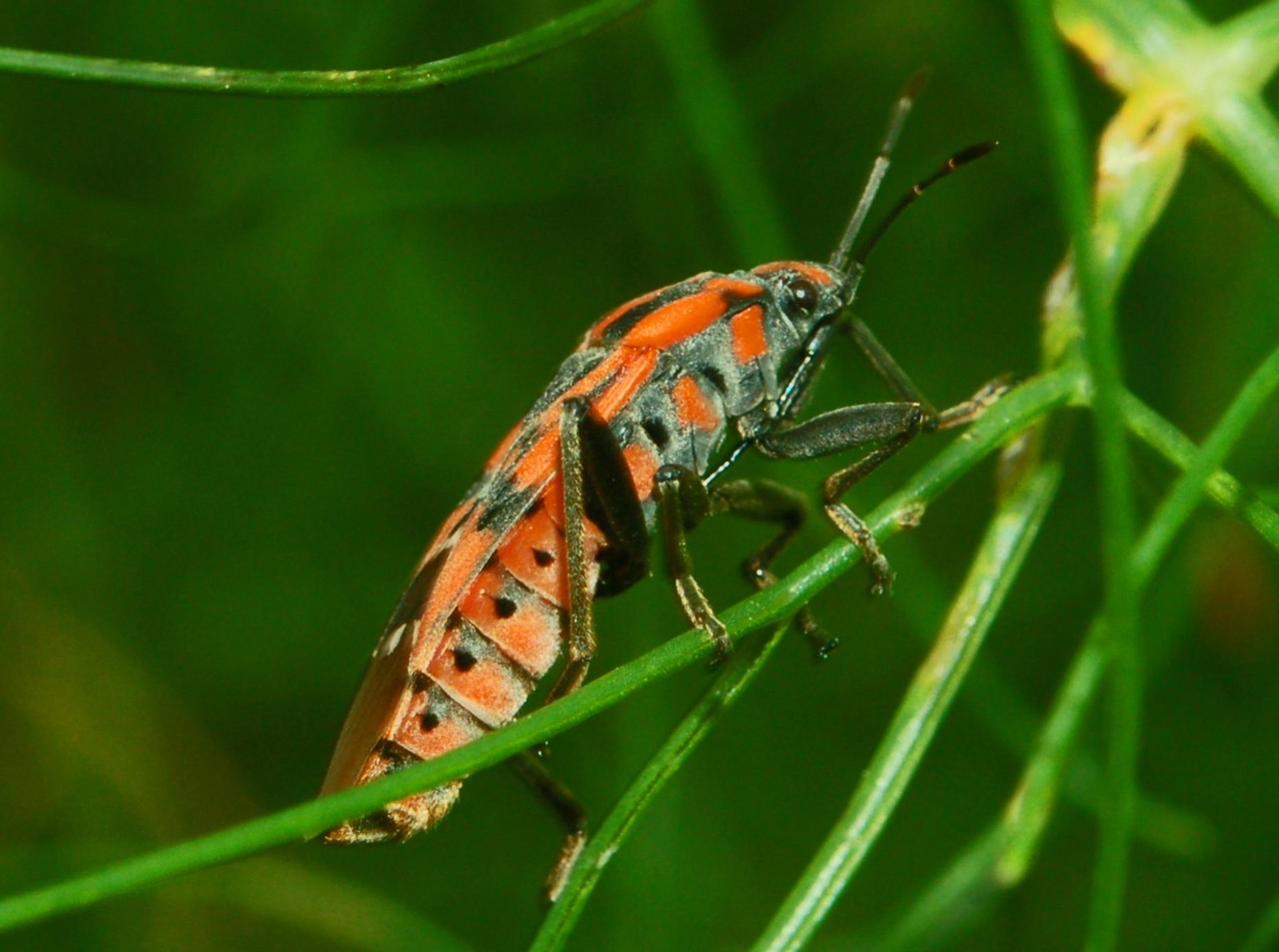
- Side view

Scientific classification
- Kingdom: Animalia
- Phylum: Arthropoda
- Clade: Pancrustacea
- Class: Insecta
- Order: Hemiptera
- Suborder: Heteroptera
- Family: Lygaeidae
- Genus: Spilostethus
- Species: S. pandurus

Binomial name
- Spilostethus pandurus (Scopoli, 1763)

Synonyms
- Cimex pandurus Scopoli, 1763

= Spilostethus pandurus =

Species of true bug

Spilostethus pandurus is a species of "seed bugs" belonging to the family Lygaeidae, subfamily Lygaeinae.

== Etymology ==
The species was described in 1763 by Scopoli in his "Entomologica carniolica" with locus typicus from the area around Ljubljana. Scopoli does not mention the etymology of the species name but may have named it for the Panduri infantry unit of the Habsburg monarchy.

== Subspecies ==
Subspecies include:

- S. pandurus subsp. pandurus (Scopoli, 1763).
- S. pandurus subsp. militaris (Fabricius, 1775).
- S. pandurus subsp. elegans (Wolff, 1802).
- S. pandurus subsp. asiaticus (Kolenati, F.A., 1845).
- S. pandurus subsp. tetricus (Horvath, G., 1909).

== Distribution ==
This species can be found in the Euro-mediterranean-Turaniaan Region, with a more southern distribution than Spilostethus saxatilis.

It is present in Albania, Austria, Bulgaria, Croatia, Cyprus, Czech Republic, France, Germany, Greece, Hungary, Italy, Israel, Malta, Portugal, Romania, Russia, Serbia, Slovakia, Slovenia, Spain, Switzerland, Turkey, Lebanon, in the Afrotropical realm. and in the southern Asia to India and China.

== Description ==
Spilostethus pandurus can reach a length of 13–15 millimetres (0.51–0.59 in). Body shows a red-black coloration with a white spot in the center of the membrane.

Two wavy, broad, black, longitudinal stripes run from the front to the rear edge of the pronotum. Scutellum is black, sometimes with a small red spot at the end.

The nymphs are bright red, with black markings.

These bugs have two dorsolateral prothoracic glands capable of secreting substances repugnant to predators.

== Biology ==
These polyphagous bugs feed on flowers and seeds of many plants. They preferentially feed on the plants of the family Apocynaceae. In Europe, they are present on various toxic plants such as jimsonweed (Datura stramonium) and oleander (Nerium oleander).

They can cause serious damage to the crops of Sesamum indicum (Pedaliaceae) and to Calotropis gigantea and Calotropis procera (Apocynaceae).

It can also attack sorghum crops (Sorghum bicolor), Eleusine coracana, Pennisetum americanum, Phaseolus mungo, Arachis hypogaea, Lycopersicon esculentum, tobacco, sunflowers etc.

== Gallery ==
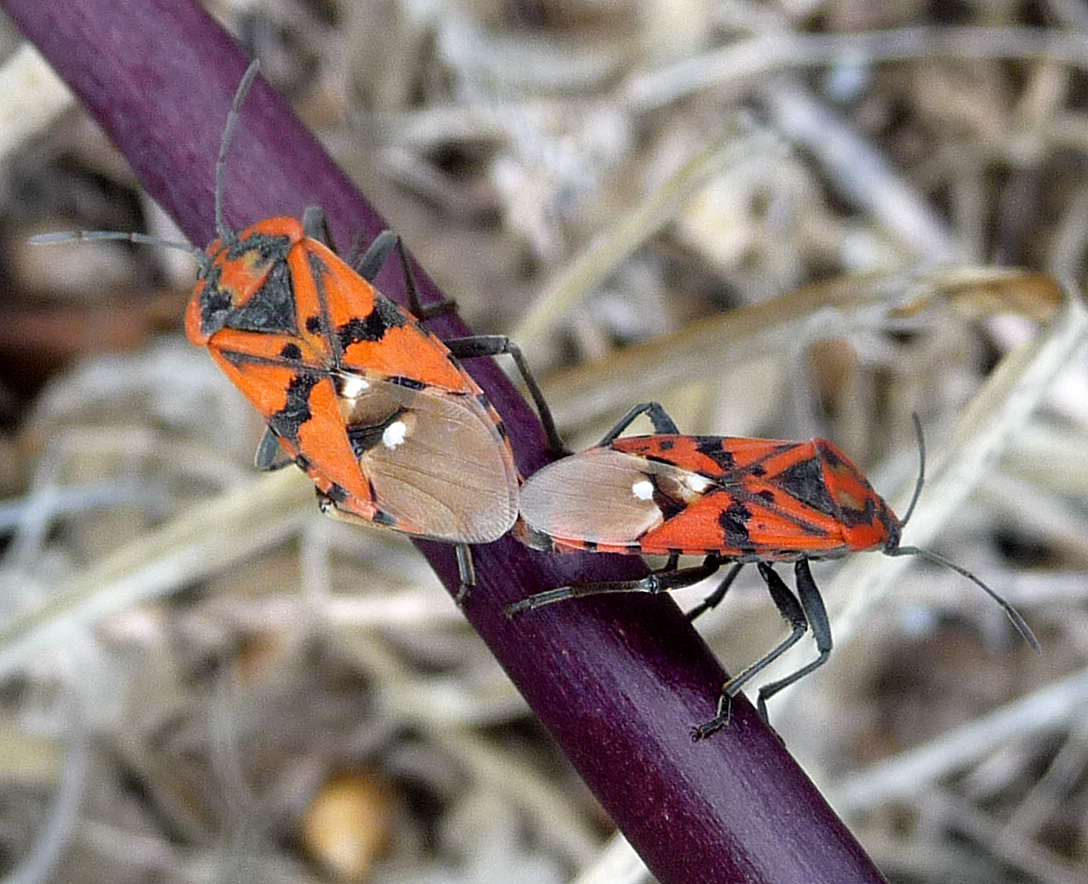
Mating

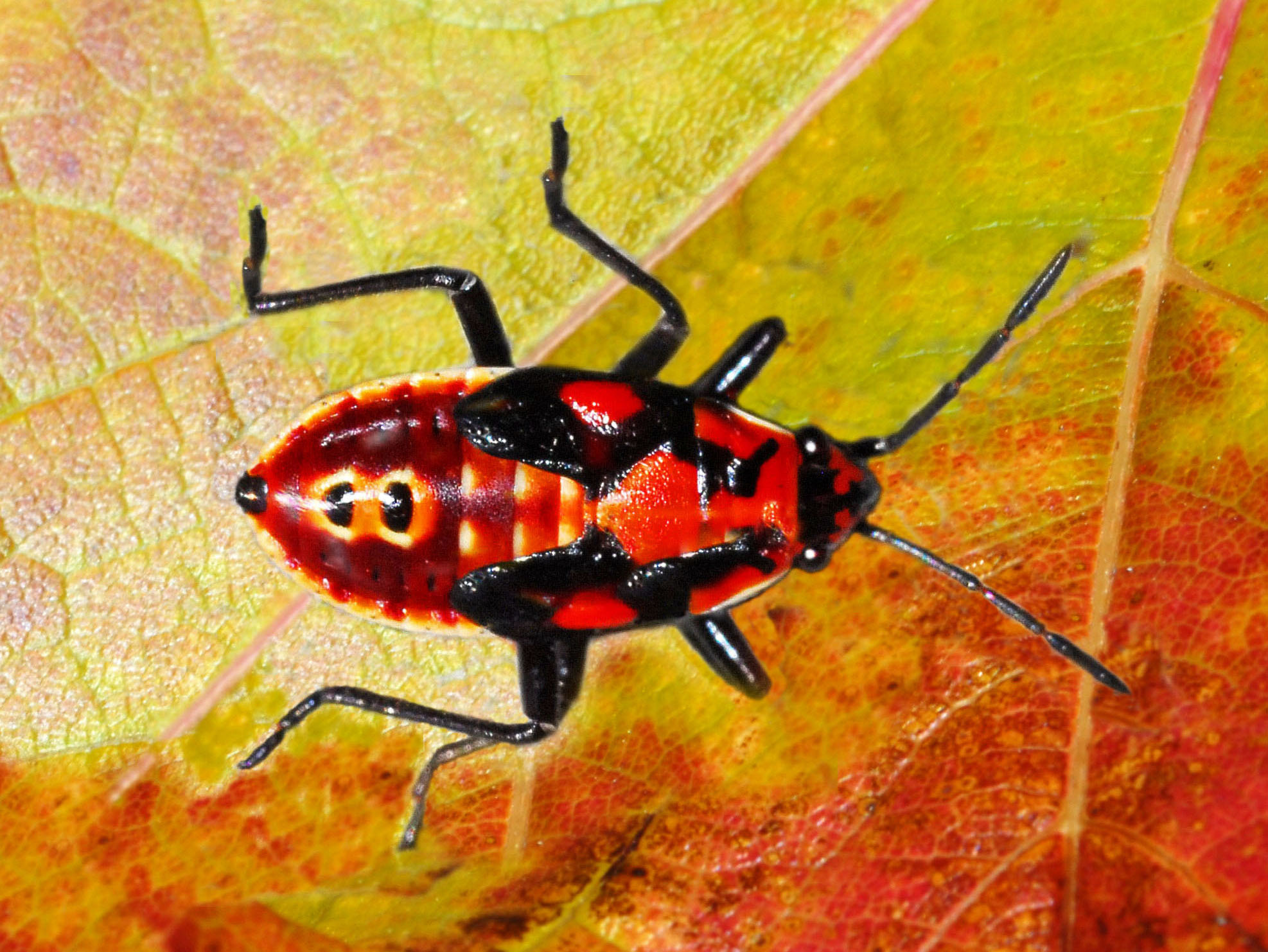
Nymph

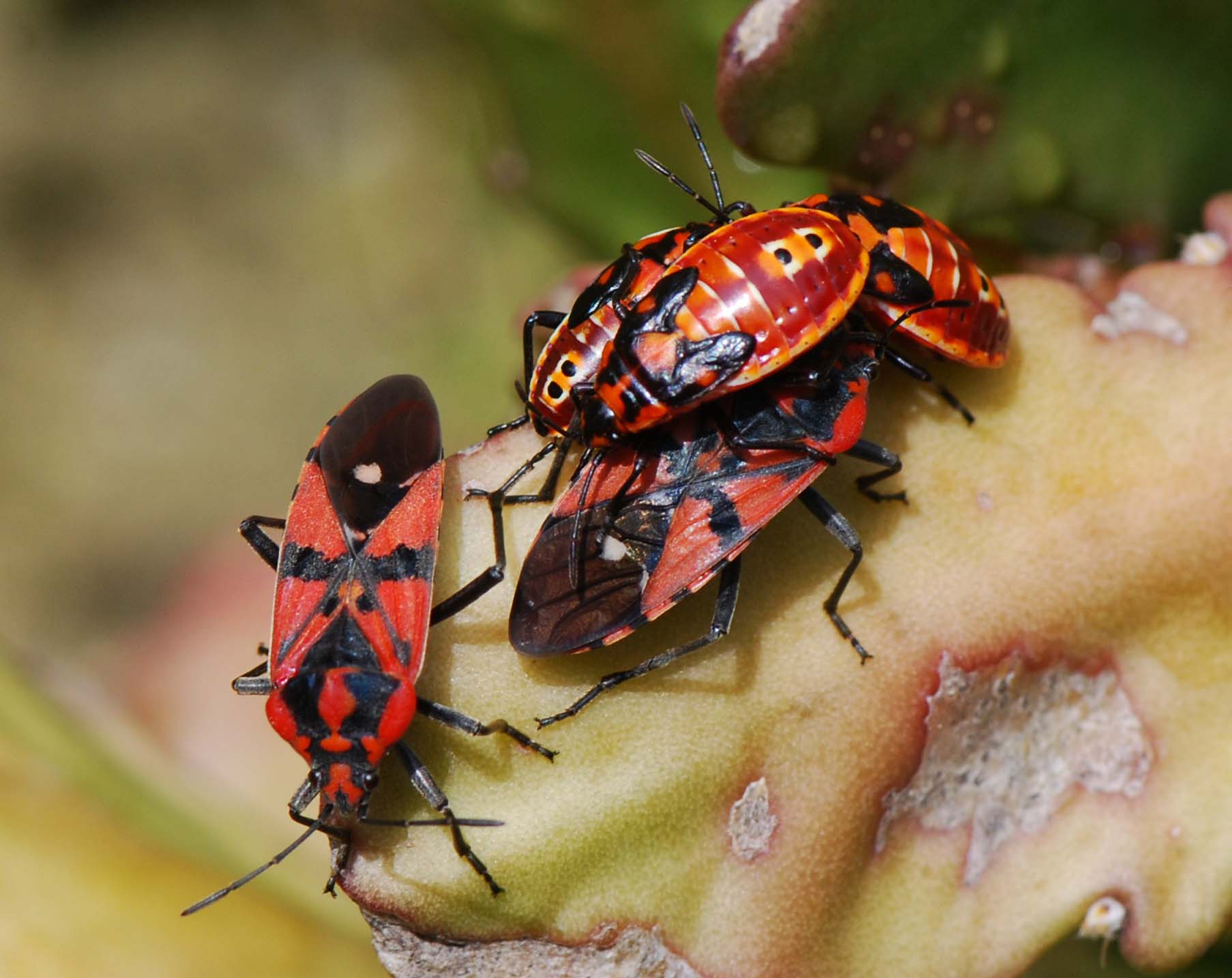
Adult and nymphs

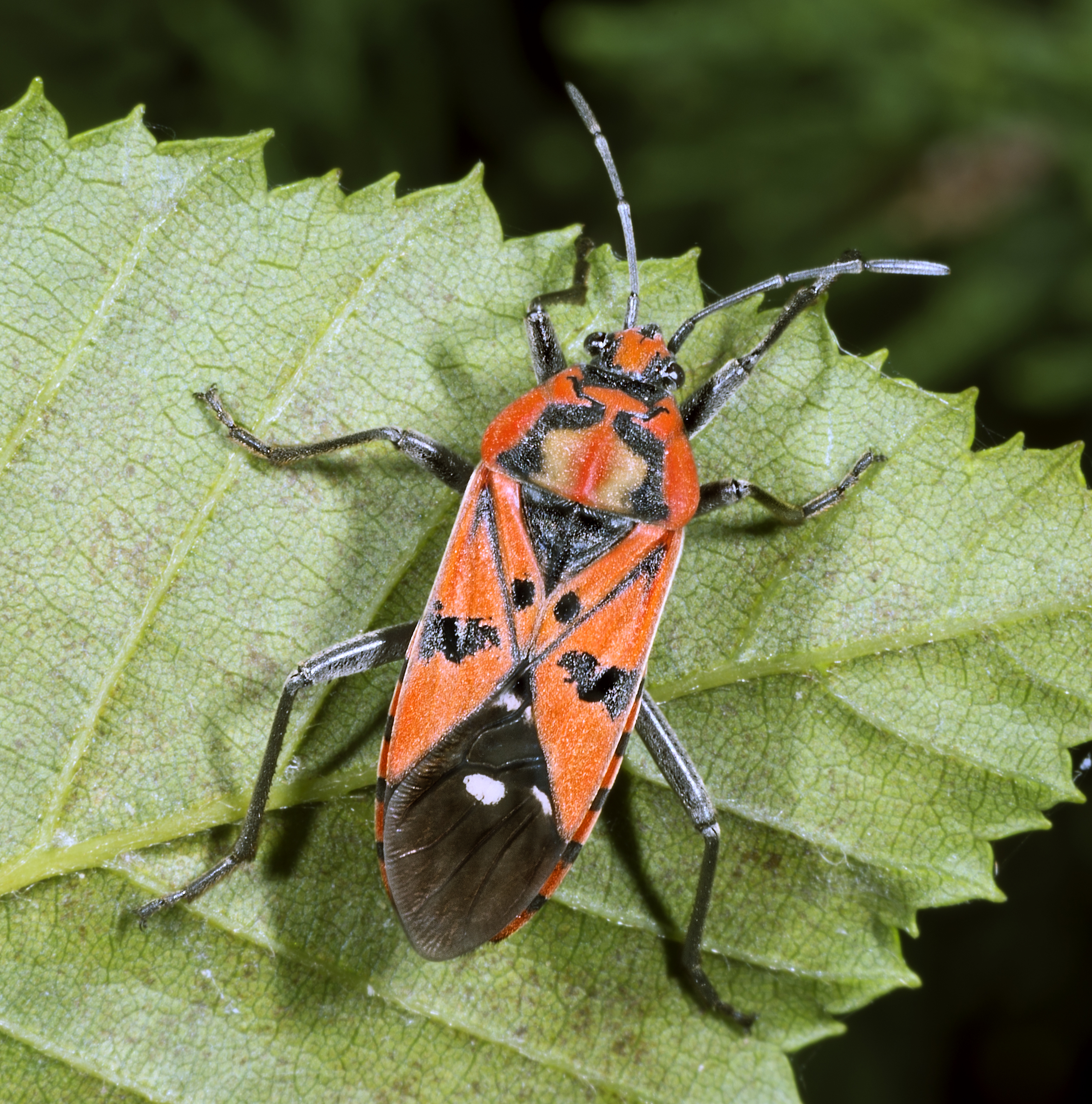
Female

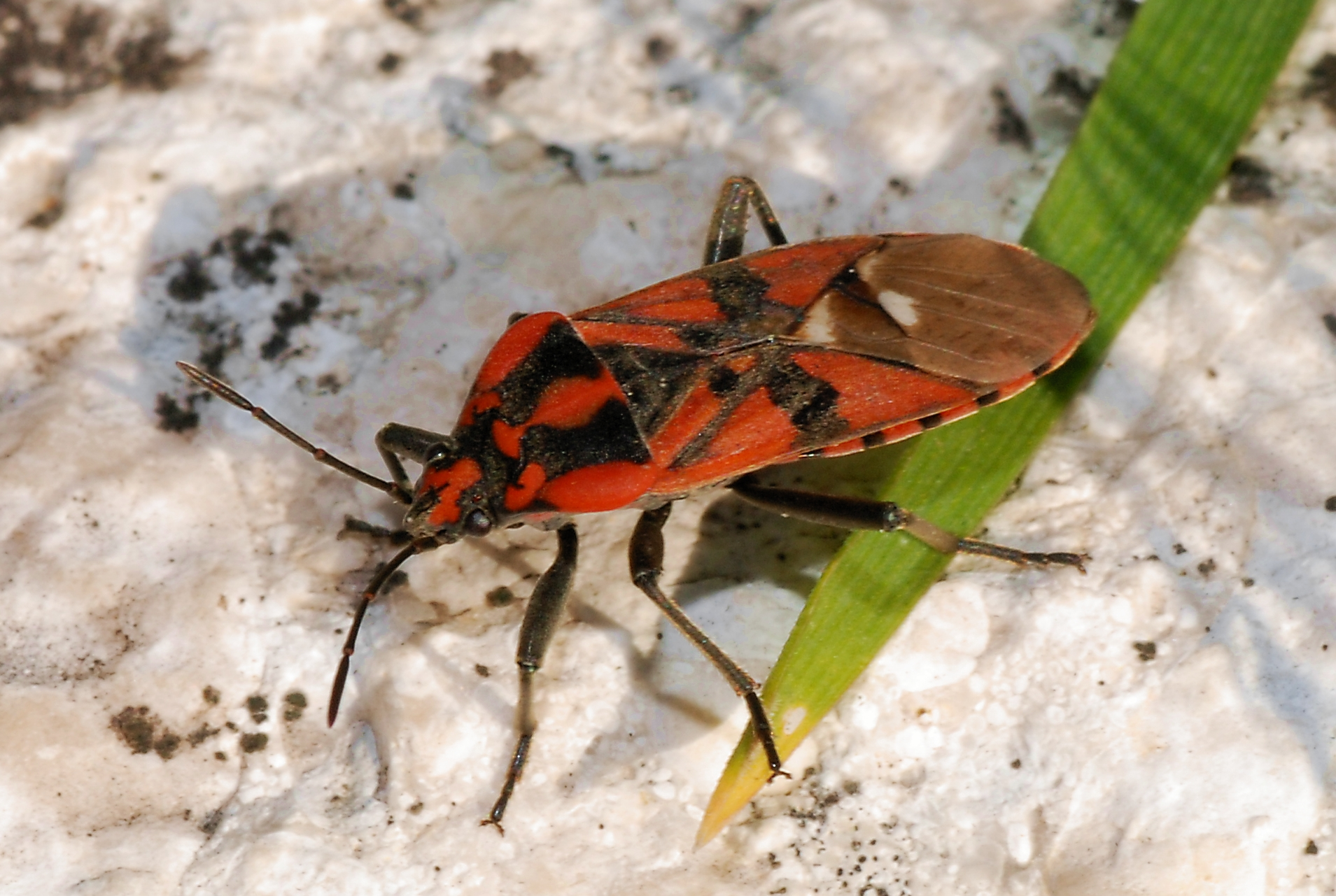
Male

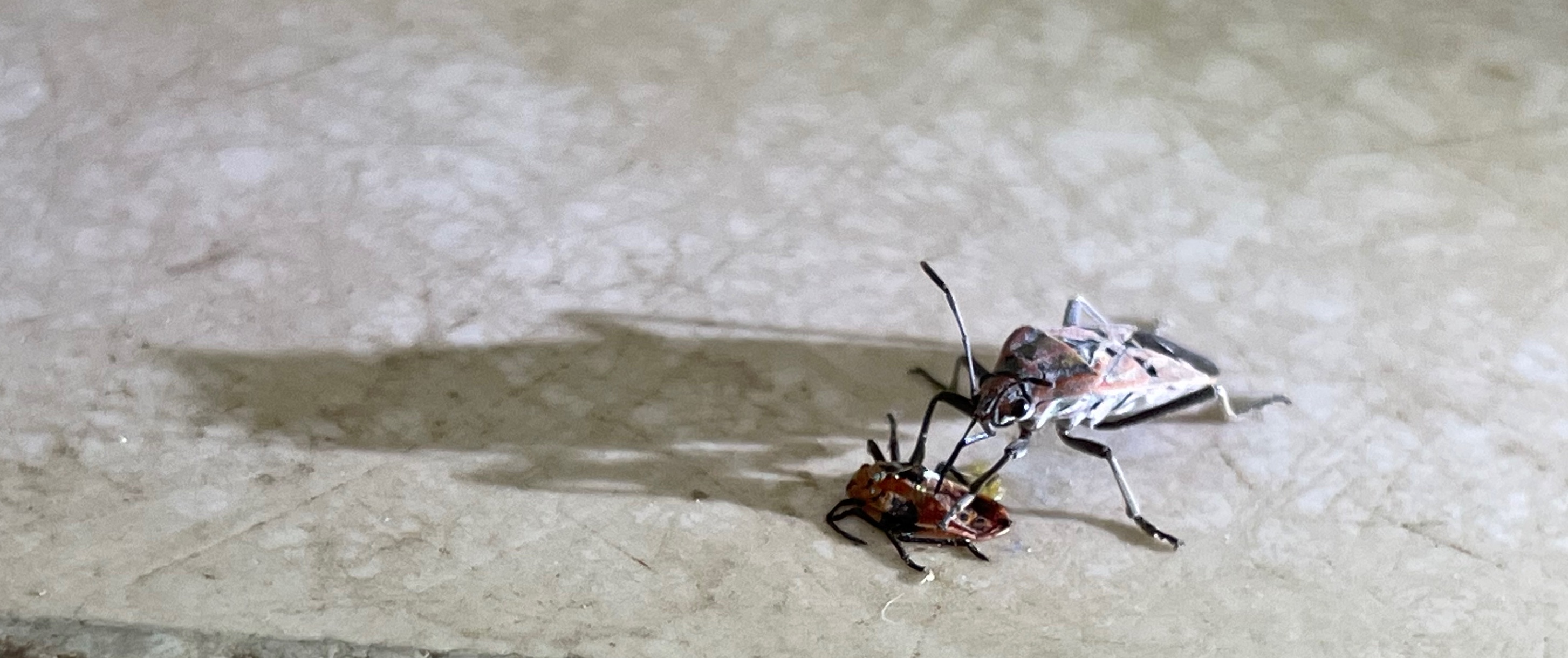
Female with rostrum in a dead nymph
