= Xyonysius basalis =

Scientific classification
- Kingdom: Animalia
- Phylum: Arthropoda
- Class: Insecta
- Order: Hemiptera
- Suborder: Heteroptera
- Family: Lygaeidae
- Tribe: Metrargini
- Genus: Xyonysius
- Species: X. basalis

Binomial name
- Xyonysius basalis (Dallas, 1852)

Species of true bug

Xyonysius basalis is a species of seed bug in the family Lygaeidae. It is found throughout the Caribbean, Central America, North America, and South America.
