= Nithecus =

Scientific classification
- Domain: Eukaryota
- Kingdom: Animalia
- Phylum: Arthropoda
- Class: Insecta
- Order: Hemiptera
- Suborder: Heteroptera
- Family: Lygaeidae
- Tribe: Nysiini
- Genus: Nithecus; Horvath, 1890

Genus of true bugs

Nithecus is a genus of true bugs belonging to the family Lygaeidae.

The species of this genus are found in Europe.

Species:

- Nithecus horvathi (Jakovlev, 1889)
- Nithecus jacobaeae (Schilling, 1829)
