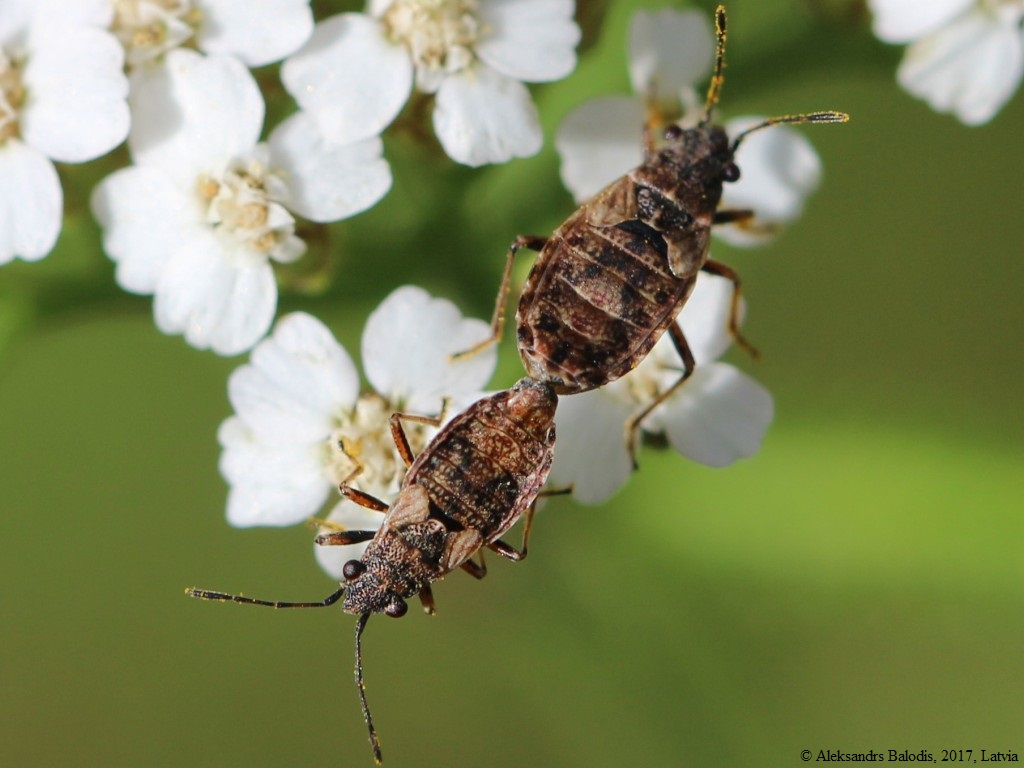
- Nithecus jacobaeae

Scientific classification
- Domain: Eukaryota
- Kingdom: Animalia
- Phylum: Arthropoda
- Class: Insecta
- Order: Hemiptera
- Suborder: Heteroptera
- Family: Lygaeidae
- Subfamily: Orsillinae
- Tribe: Nysiini
- Genus: Nithecus
- Species: N. jacobaeae

Binomial name
- Nithecus jacobaeae (Schilling, 1829)

= Nithecus jacobaeae =

Species of seed bug

Nithecus jacobaeae is a species of seed bug in the family Lygaeidae, found in the Palearctic.

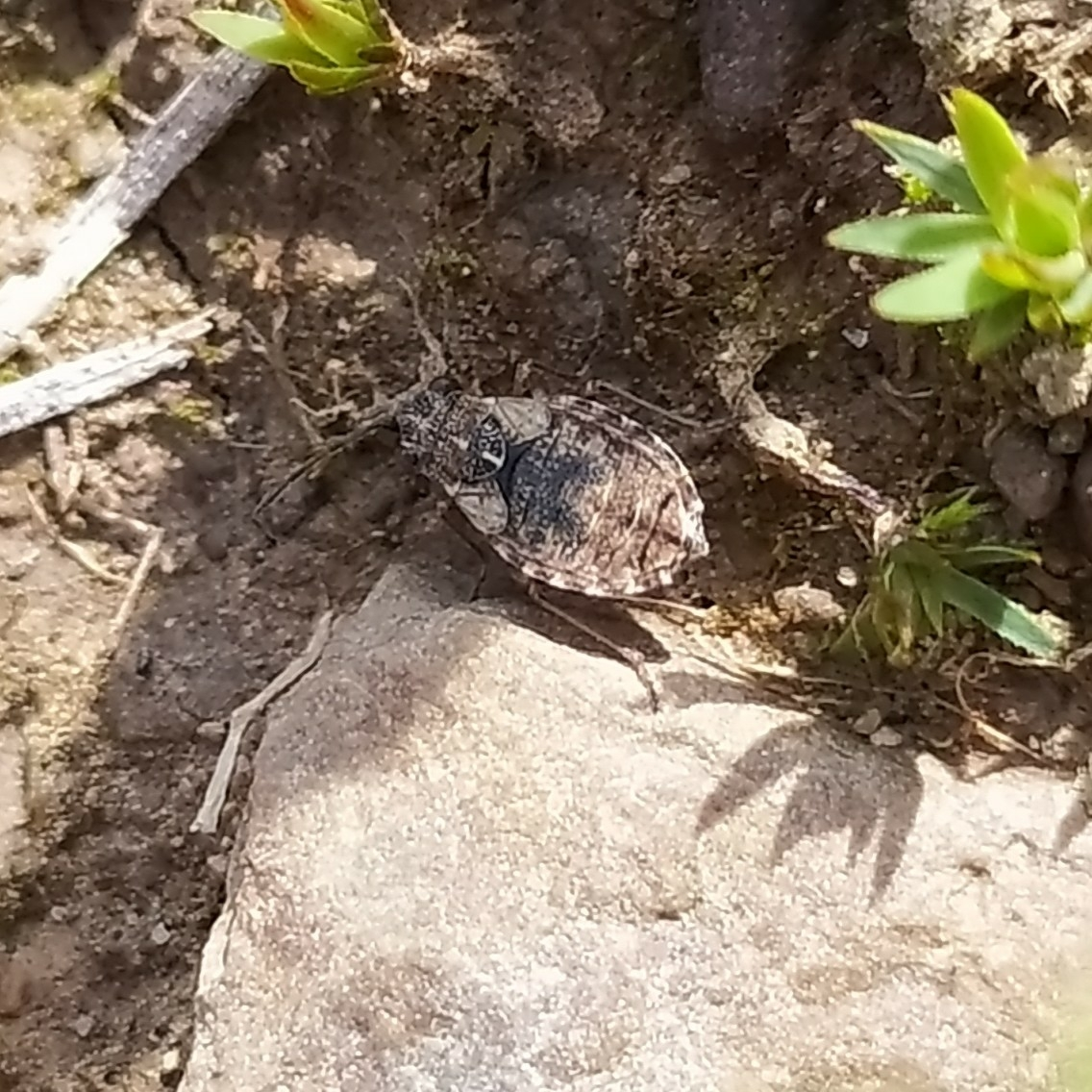
Nithecus jacobaeae, Russia
