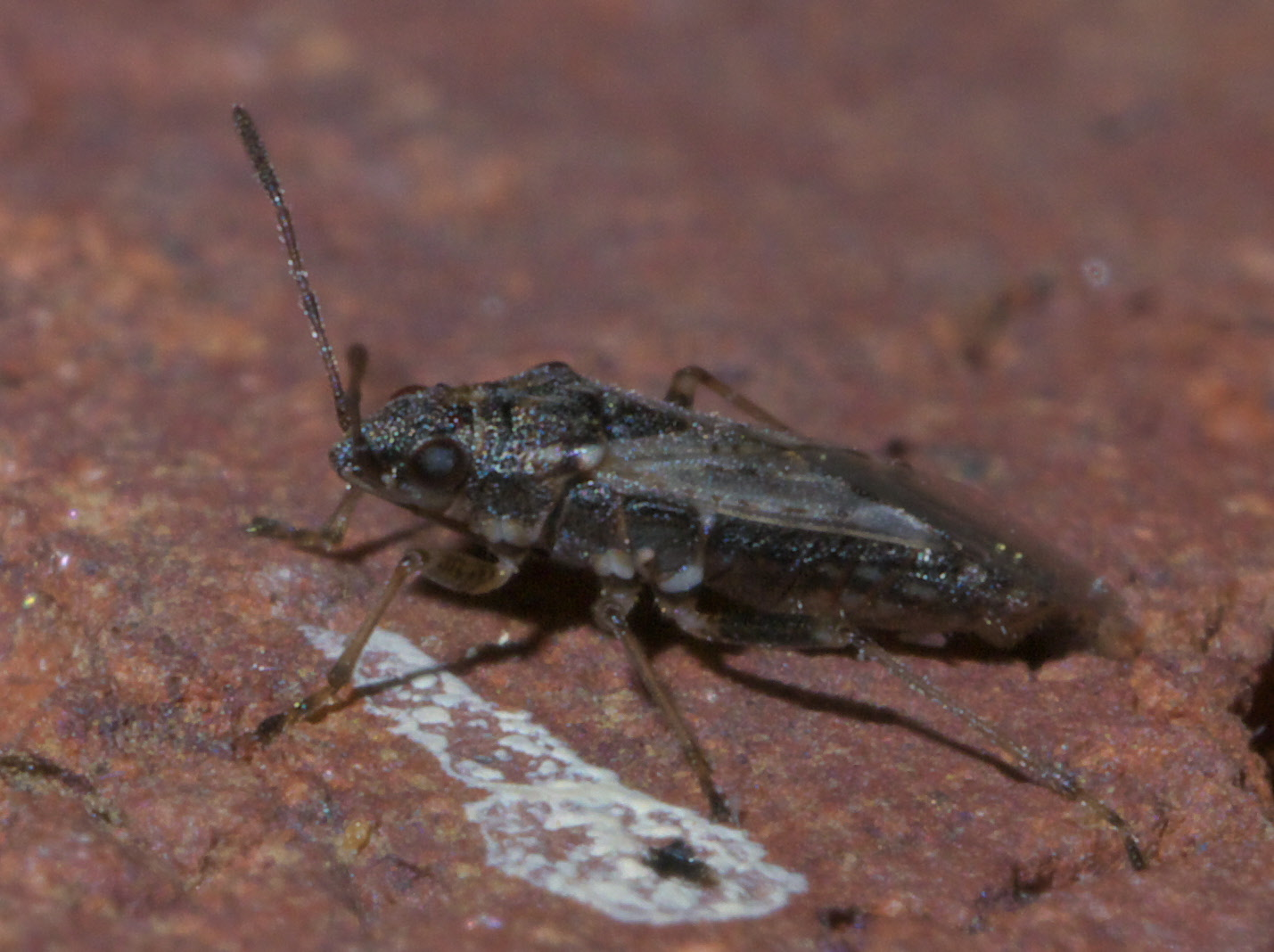

Scientific classification
- Domain: Eukaryota
- Kingdom: Animalia
- Phylum: Arthropoda
- Class: Insecta
- Order: Hemiptera
- Suborder: Heteroptera
- Family: Lygaeidae
- Subfamily: Orsillinae
- Tribe: Metrargini
- Genus: Xyonysius; Ashlock & Lattin, 1963

= Xyonysius =

Genus of true bugs

Xyonysius is a genus of seed bugs in the family Lygaeidae. There are about eight described species in Xyonysius.

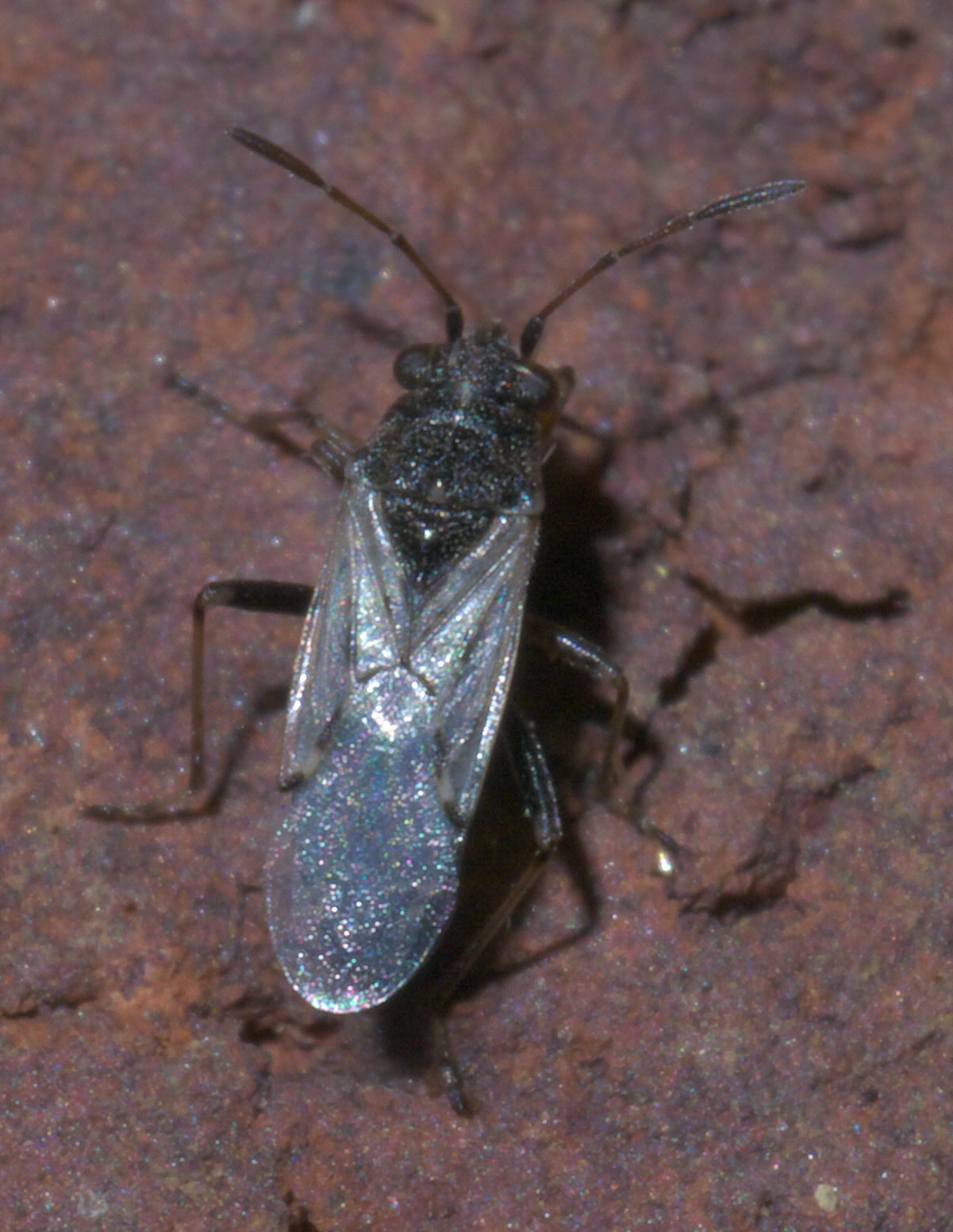

== Species ==
These 10 species belong to the genus Xyonysius:

Xyonysius acticola Baranowski & Slater, 1997
Xyonysius adjunctor (Barber, 1947)
Xyonysius basalis (Dallas, 1852)
Xyonysius californicus (Stal, 1859) (California false chinch bug)
Xyonysius ellipticus (Berg, 1892)
Xyonysius humilis (Spinola, 1852)
Xyonysius naso (Van Duzee, 1933)
Xyonysius volxemi (Distant, 1888)
