= Xyonysius californicus =

Scientific classification
- Domain: Eukaryota
- Kingdom: Animalia
- Phylum: Arthropoda
- Class: Insecta
- Order: Hemiptera
- Suborder: Heteroptera
- Family: Lygaeidae
- Tribe: Metrargini
- Genus: Xyonysius
- Species: X. californicus

Binomial name
- Xyonysius californicus (Stal, 1859)

Synonyms
- Nysius californicus Stål, 1859

Species of true bug

Xyonysius californicus, the California false chinch bug, is a species of seed bug in the family Lygaeidae. It is found in the Caribbean Sea, Central America, North America, and South America.

== Subspecies ==
These two subspecies belong to the species Xyonysius californicus:

- Xyonysius californicus alabamensis (Baker, 1906)
- Xyonysius californicus californicus (Stal, 1859)
