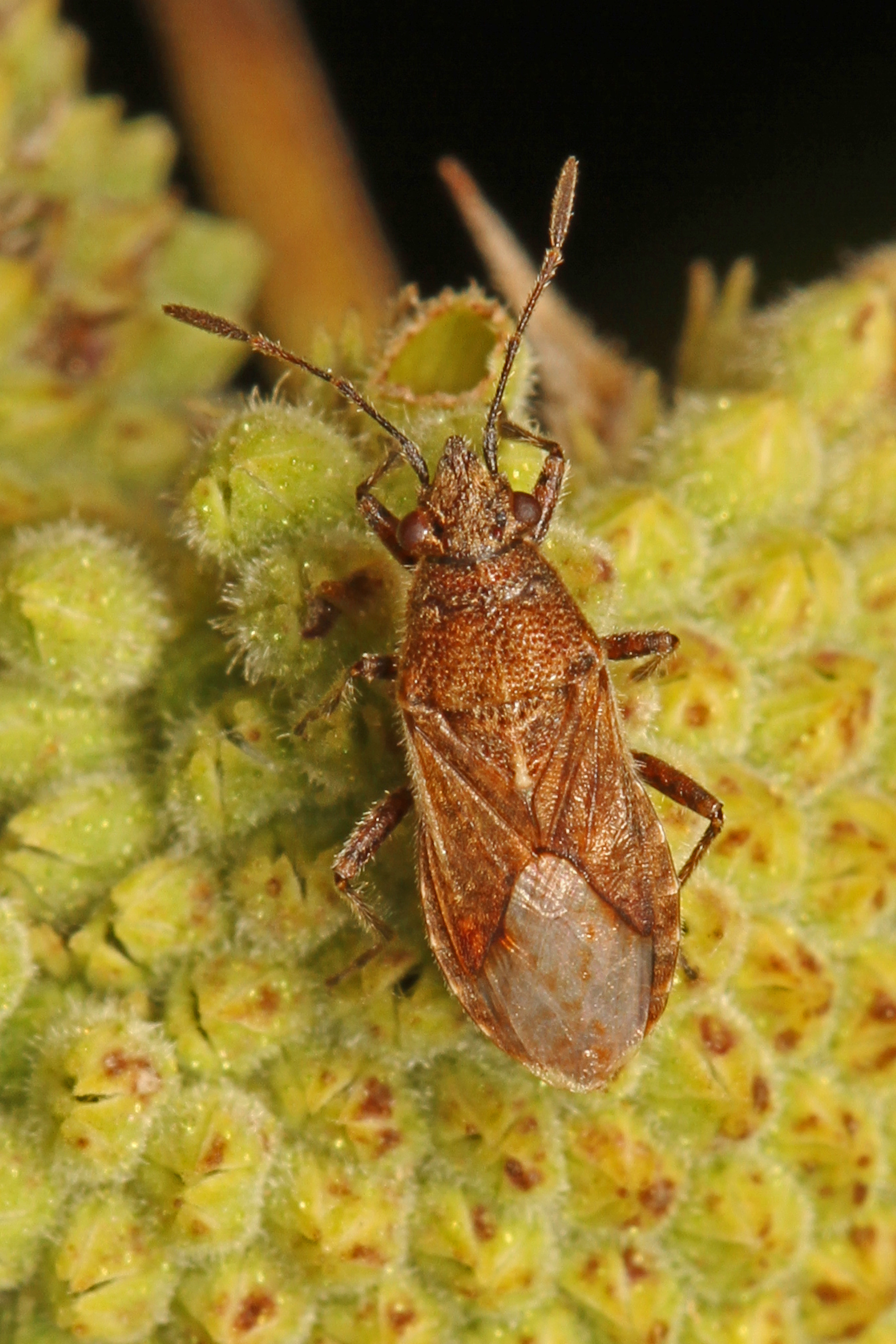

Scientific classification
- Domain: Eukaryota
- Kingdom: Animalia
- Phylum: Arthropoda
- Class: Insecta
- Order: Hemiptera
- Suborder: Heteroptera
- Family: Lygaeidae
- Genus: Neortholomus
- Species: N. scolopax

Binomial name
- Neortholomus scolopax (Say, 1832)

Synonyms
- Lygaeus scolopax Say, 1832

= Neortholomus scolopax =

Species of true bug

Neortholomus scolopax is a species of seed bugs in the family Lygaeidae. It is found in Central America and North America.
