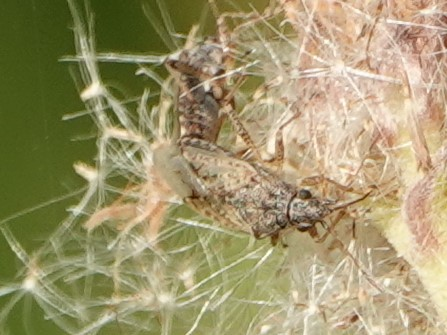

Scientific classification
- Domain: Eukaryota
- Kingdom: Animalia
- Phylum: Arthropoda
- Class: Insecta
- Order: Hemiptera
- Suborder: Heteroptera
- Family: Lygaeidae
- Tribe: Orsillini
- Genus: Neortholomus
- Species: N. koreshanus

Binomial name
- Neortholomus koreshanus (Van Duzee, 1909)

= Neortholomus koreshanus =

Species of true bug

Neortholomus koreshanus is a species of seed bug in the family Lygaeidae. It is found in the Caribbean and North America.
