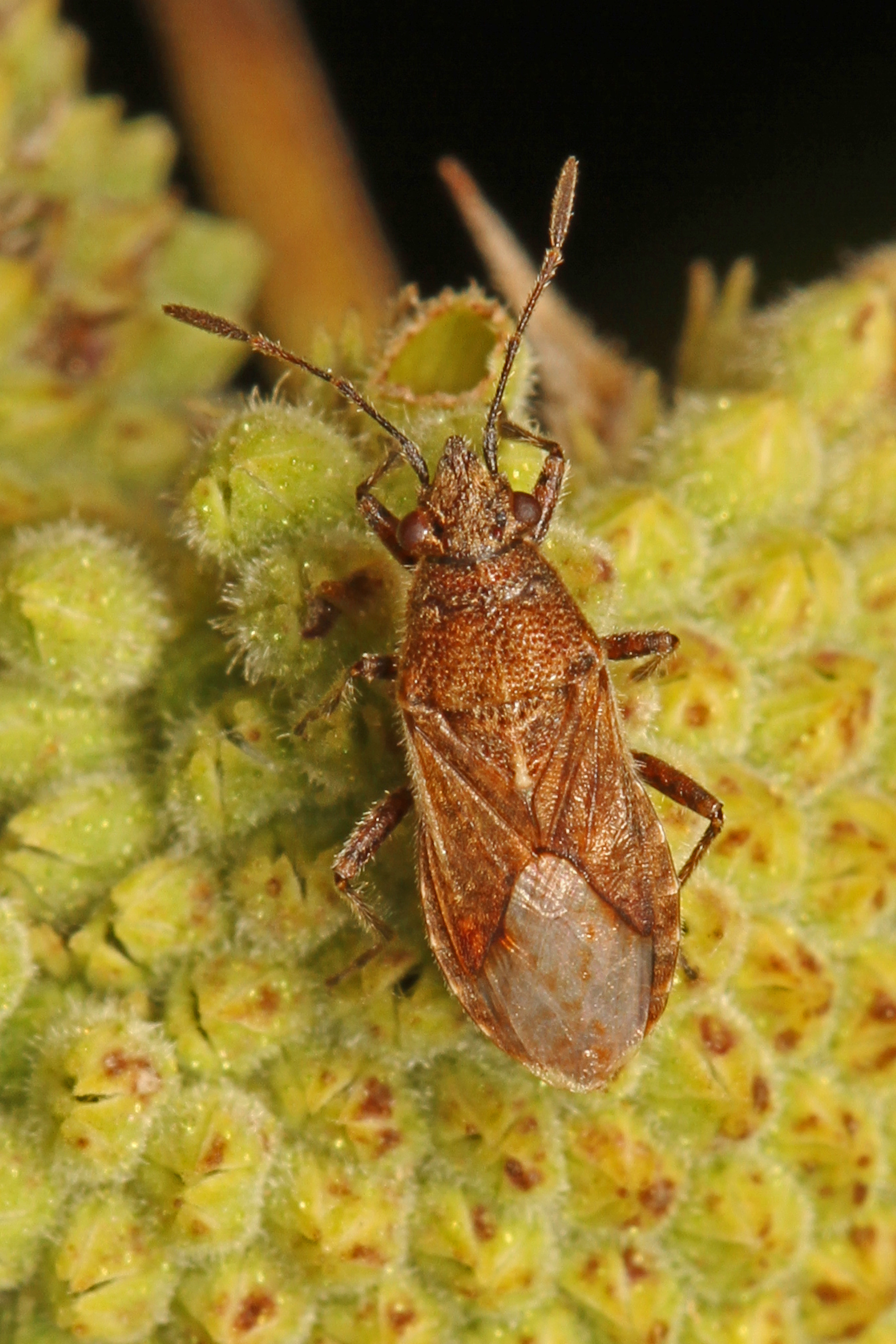
- Neortholomus scolopax

Scientific classification
- Domain: Eukaryota
- Kingdom: Animalia
- Phylum: Arthropoda
- Class: Insecta
- Order: Hemiptera
- Suborder: Heteroptera
- Family: Lygaeidae
- Subfamily: Orsillinae
- Tribe: Orsillini
- Genus: Neortholomus; Hamilton, 1983

= Neortholomus =

Genus of true bugs

Neortholomus is a genus of seed bugs in the family Lygaeidae. There are about nine described species in Neortholomus.

== Species ==
These species belong to the genus Neortholomus:

Neortholomus arphnoides (Baker, 1906)
Neortholomus gibbifer (Berg, 1892)
Neortholomus jamaicensis (Dallas, 1852)
Neortholomus koreshanus (Van Duzee, 1909)
Neortholomus nevadensis (Baker, 1906)
Neortholomus procerodorus Hamilton, 1983
Neortholomus rubricatus (Berg, 1878)
Neortholomus scolopax (Say, 1831)
Neortholomus usingeri (Ashlock, 1972)
