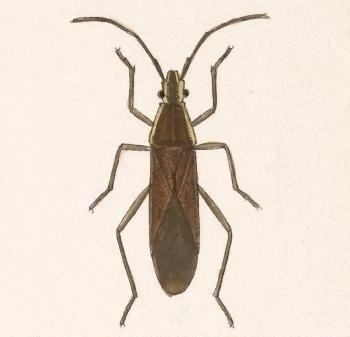

Scientific classification
- Kingdom: Animalia
- Phylum: Arthropoda
- Clade: Pancrustacea
- Class: Insecta
- Order: Hemiptera
- Suborder: Heteroptera
- Family: Alydidae
- Tribe: Micrelytrini
- Genus: Darmistus
- Species: D. subvittatus

Binomial name
- Darmistus subvittatus Stål, 1859

= Darmistus subvittatus =

Species of true bug

Darmistus subvittatus is a species of broad-headed bug in the family Alydidae. It is found in North America.
