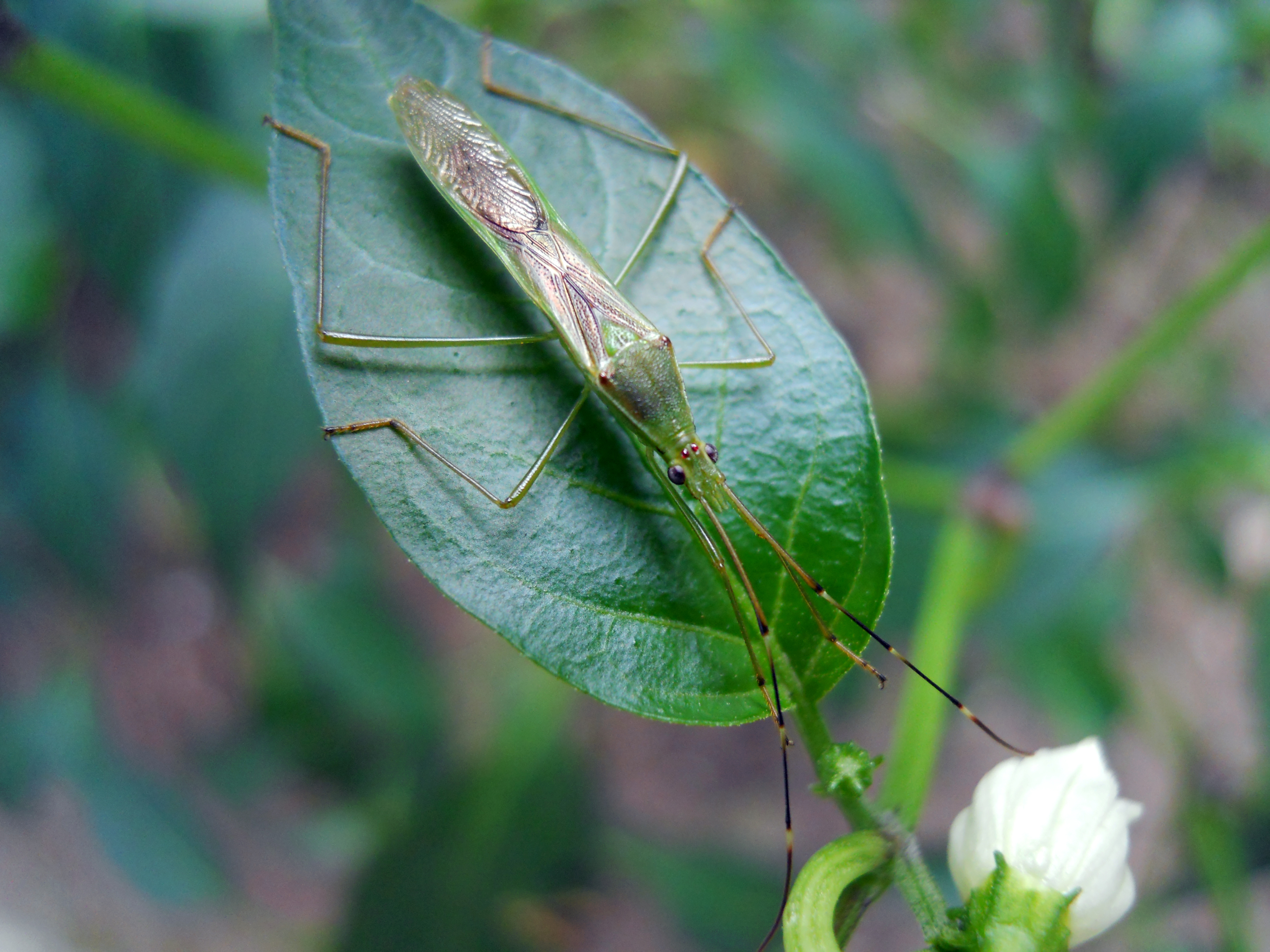

Scientific classification
- Kingdom: Animalia
- Phylum: Arthropoda
- Class: Insecta
- Order: Hemiptera
- Suborder: Heteroptera
- Family: Alydidae
- Subfamily: Micrelytrinae
- Tribe: Leptocorisini
- Genus: Leptocorisa
- Species: L. acuta

Binomial name
- Leptocorisa acuta (Thunberg, 1783)

Synonyms
- Cimex acutus Thunberg, 1783; Cimex angustatus Fabricius, 1787; Gerris varicornis Fabricius, 1803; Leptocorisa burmeisteri Montrouzier, 1865; Leptocorisa flavida Guérin-Méneville, 1831; Rhabdocoris arcuata Kolenati, 1845

= Leptocorisa acuta =

Species of true bug

Leptocorisa acuta, the paddy earhead bug, is a species of bug recorded from northern Australia, Malesia and Taiwan. Its basionym is Cimex acutus and it is now placed in the family Alydidae. One of several rice bug species, it may be confused with Leptocorisa oratoria.

== Pest status ==
Rice bugs can be a significant pest of the rice plant, as they feed-on developing (milk stage) grains: reducing crop quality and sometimes yield. Because attacks occur near to harvest, if farmers spray insecticides in an attempt to control outbreaks, they risk leaving harmful pesticide residues on the crop.

It is also a pest of sorghum, pearl millet, and finger millet in Asia.

== Gallery ==
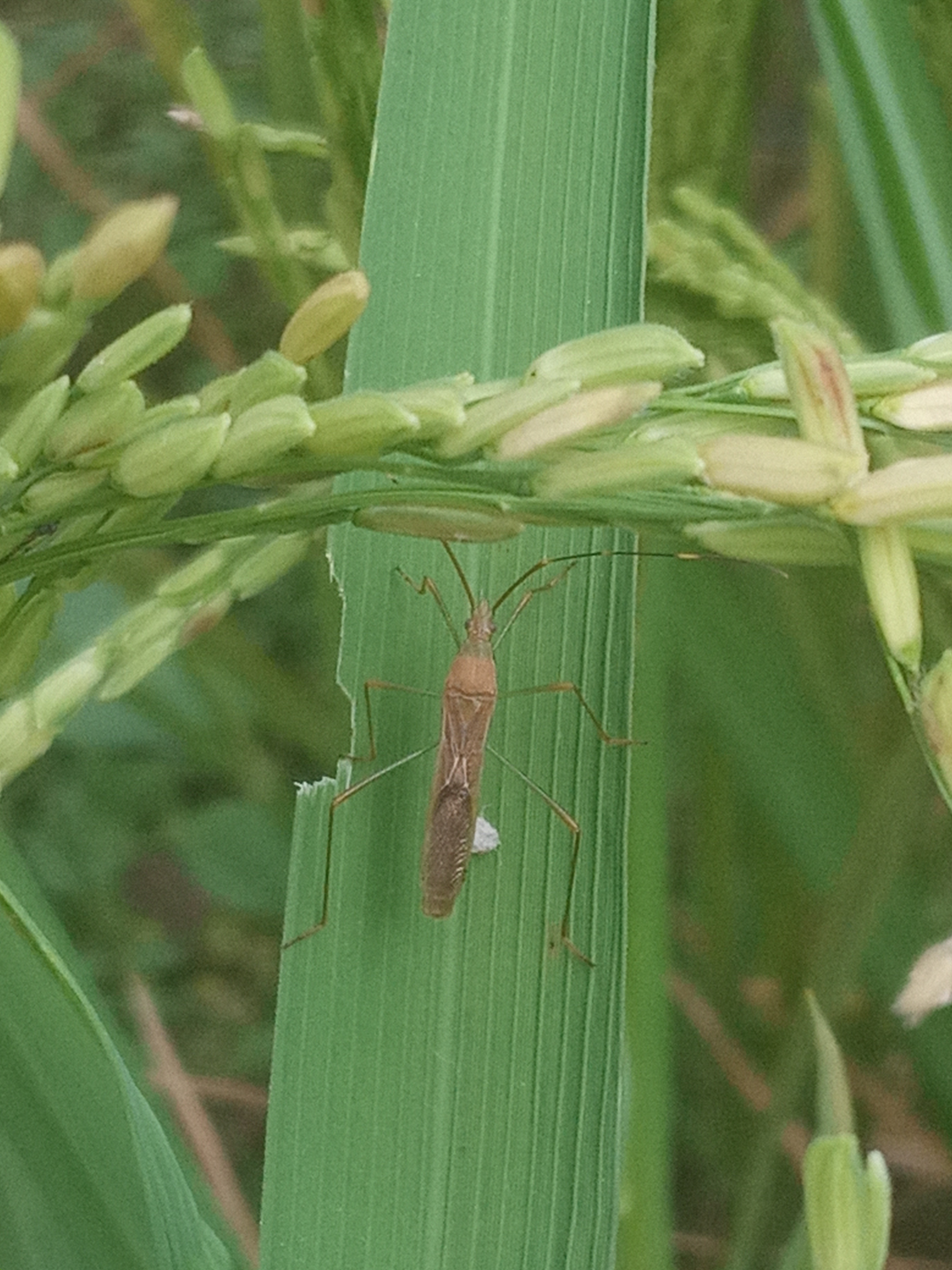
Leptocorisa acuta

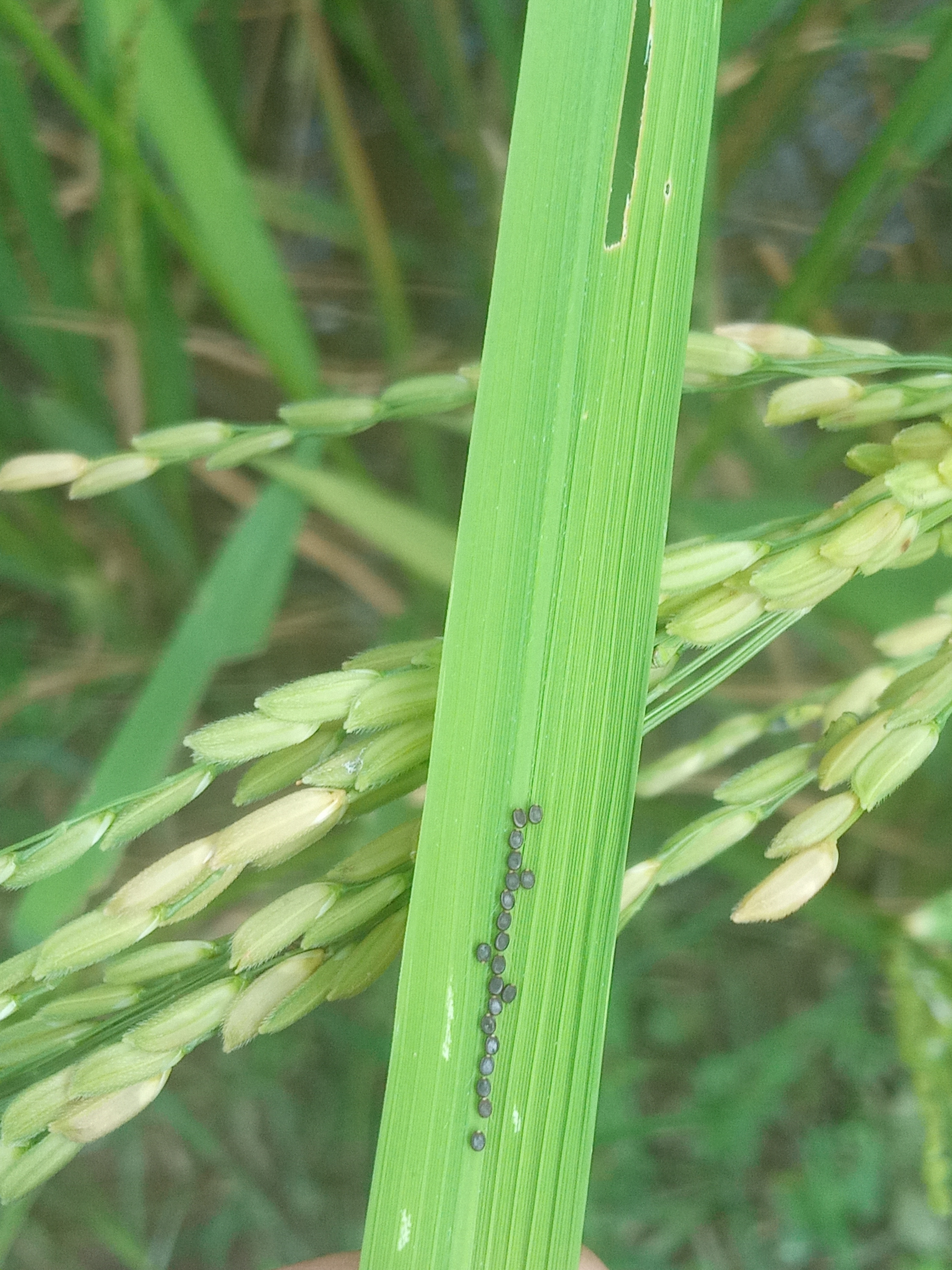
Rice Bug eggs
