= Darmistus duncani =

Scientific classification
- Domain: Eukaryota
- Kingdom: Animalia
- Phylum: Arthropoda
- Class: Insecta
- Order: Hemiptera
- Suborder: Heteroptera
- Family: Alydidae
- Tribe: Micrelytrini
- Genus: Darmistus
- Species: D. duncani

Binomial name
- Darmistus duncani Van Duzee, 1937

Species of true bug

Darmistus duncani is a species of broad-headed bug in the family Alydidae. It is found in North America.
