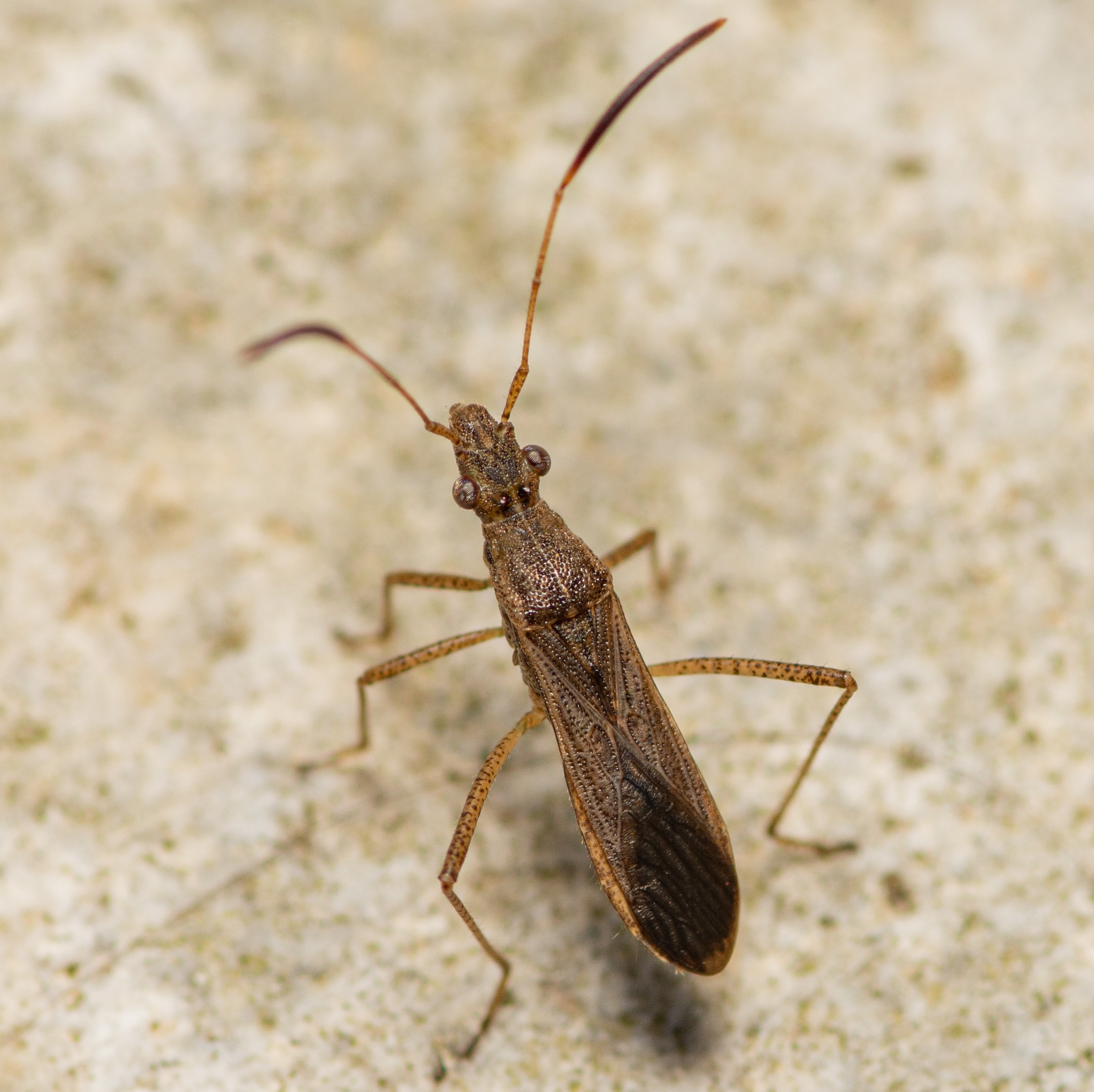

Scientific classification
- Domain: Eukaryota
- Kingdom: Animalia
- Phylum: Arthropoda
- Class: Insecta
- Order: Hemiptera
- Suborder: Heteroptera
- Family: Alydidae
- Genus: Esperanza
- Species: E. texana

Binomial name
- Esperanza texana Barber, 1906

= Esperanza texana =

Species of insect

Esperanza texana is a species of broad-headed bug in the family Alydidae. It is the only described member of the genus Esperanza. It is found in Central America, North America, and the West Indies.
