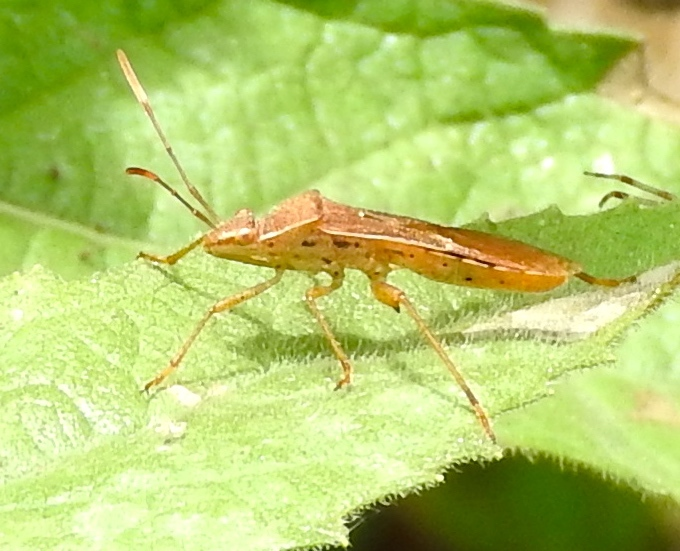

Scientific classification
- Domain: Eukaryota
- Kingdom: Animalia
- Phylum: Arthropoda
- Class: Insecta
- Order: Hemiptera
- Suborder: Heteroptera
- Family: Alydidae
- Genus: Burtinus
- Species: B. notatipennis

Binomial name
- Burtinus notatipennis Stål, 1859

= Burtinus notatipennis =

Species of true bug

Burtinus notatipennis is a species of broad-headed bug in the family Alydidae. It is found in Central America, North America, and South America.
