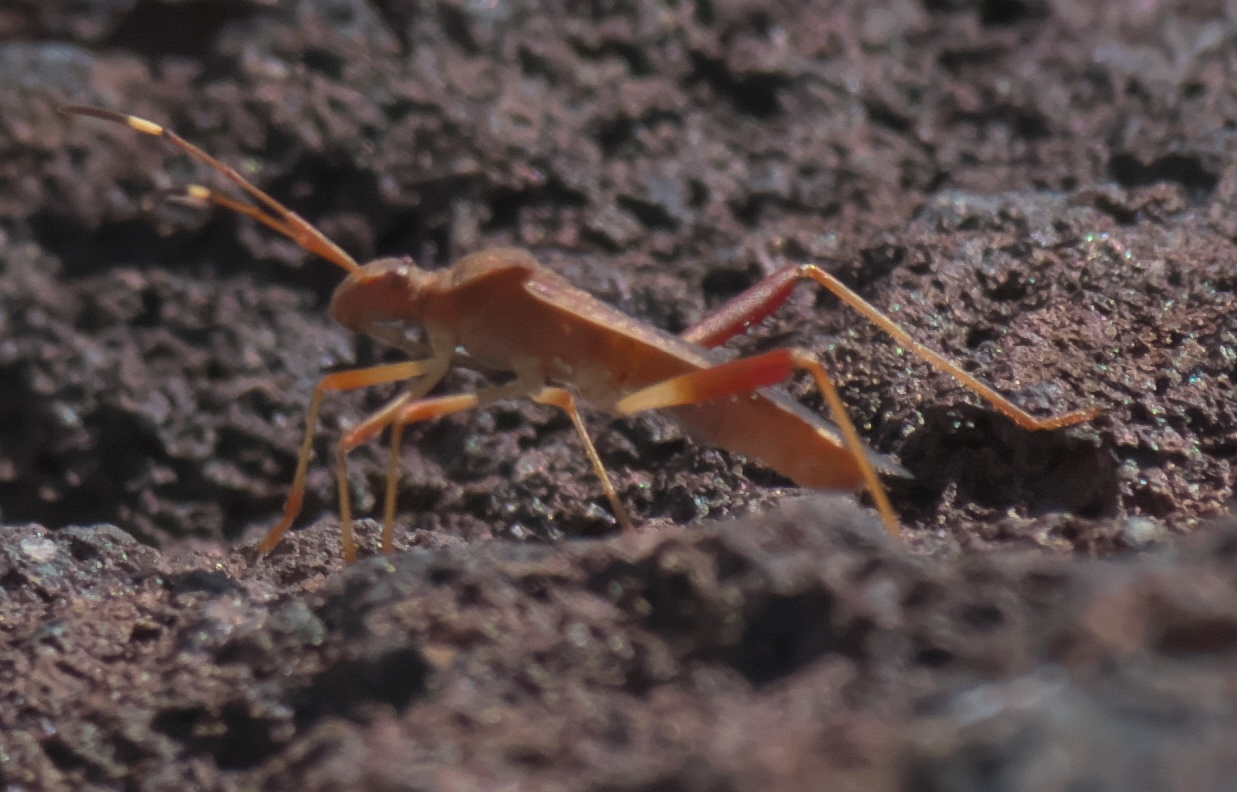

Scientific classification
- Domain: Eukaryota
- Kingdom: Animalia
- Phylum: Arthropoda
- Class: Insecta
- Order: Hemiptera
- Suborder: Heteroptera
- Family: Alydidae
- Genus: Megalotomus
- Species: M. quinquespinosus

Binomial name
- Megalotomus quinquespinosus (Say, 1825)

= Megalotomus quinquespinosus =

Species of true bug

Megalotomus quinquespinosus, the lupine bug, is a species of broad-headed bug in the family Alydidae. It is found in North America.
