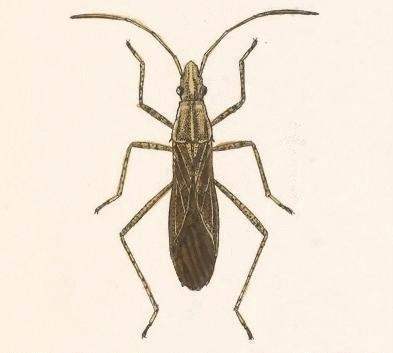

Scientific classification
- Domain: Eukaryota
- Kingdom: Animalia
- Phylum: Arthropoda
- Class: Insecta
- Order: Hemiptera
- Suborder: Heteroptera
- Family: Alydidae
- Genus: Cydamus
- Species: C. borealis

Binomial name
- Cydamus borealis Distant, 1881

= Cydamus borealis =

Species of true bug

Cydamus borealis is a species of broad-headed bug in the family Alydidae. It is found in Central America and North America.
