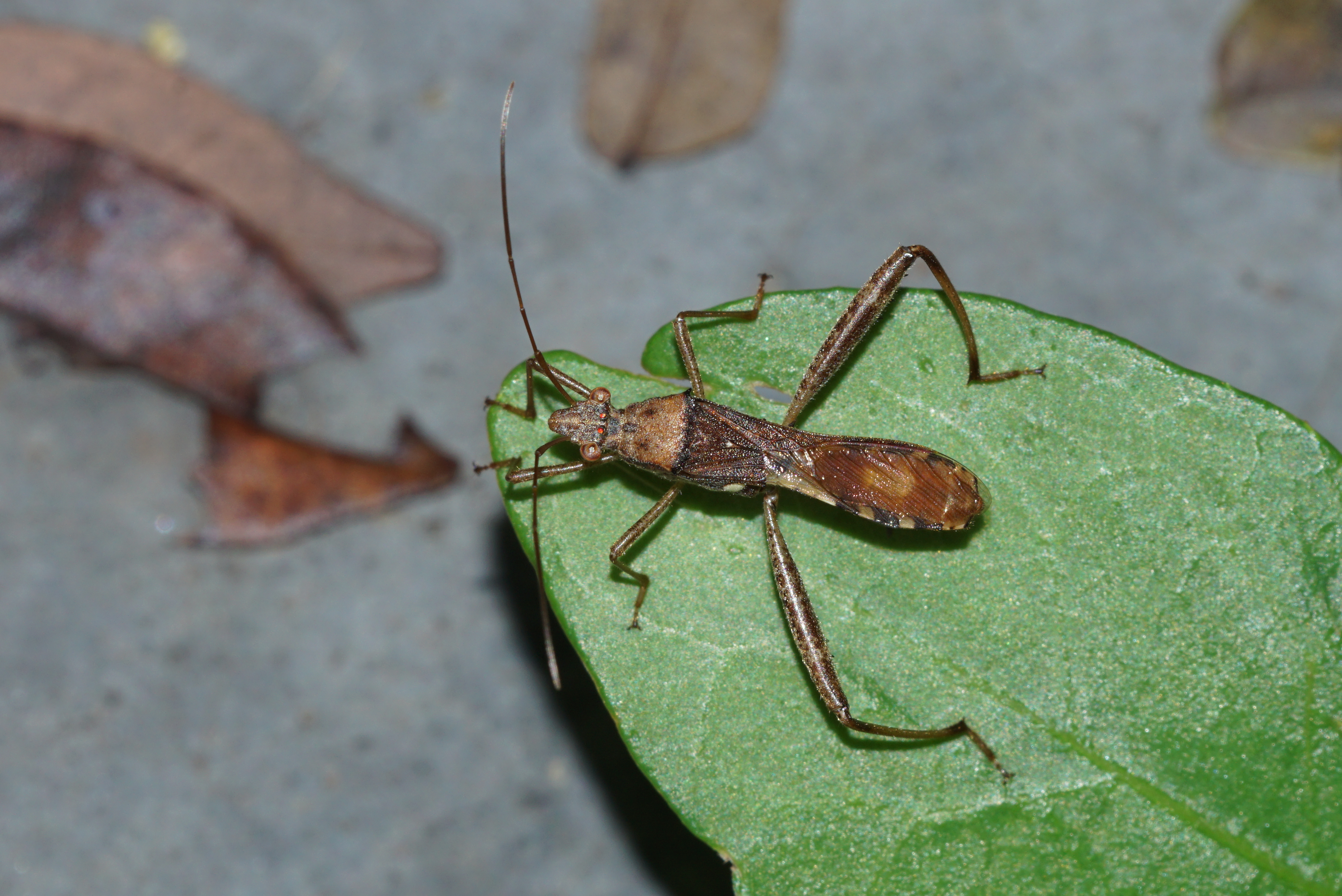

Scientific classification
- Kingdom: Animalia
- Phylum: Arthropoda
- Class: Insecta
- Order: Hemiptera
- Suborder: Heteroptera
- Family: Alydidae
- Genus: Riptortus
- Species: R. linearis

Binomial name
- Riptortus linearis (Fabricius, 1775)

Synonyms
- Cimex linearis

= Riptortus linearis =

Species of true bug

Riptortus linearis is a species of true bug in the family Alydidae. It is a pest of sorghum in India.
