= Neomegalotomus rufipes =

Scientific classification
- Kingdom: Animalia
- Phylum: Arthropoda
- Class: Insecta
- Order: Hemiptera
- Suborder: Heteroptera
- Family: Alydidae
- Genus: Neomegalotomus
- Species: N. rufipes

Binomial name
- Neomegalotomus rufipes (Westwood, 1842)

Species of true bug

Neomegalotomus rufipes is a species of broad-headed bug in the family Alydidae. It is found in the Caribbean Sea, North America, and the Caribbean.
