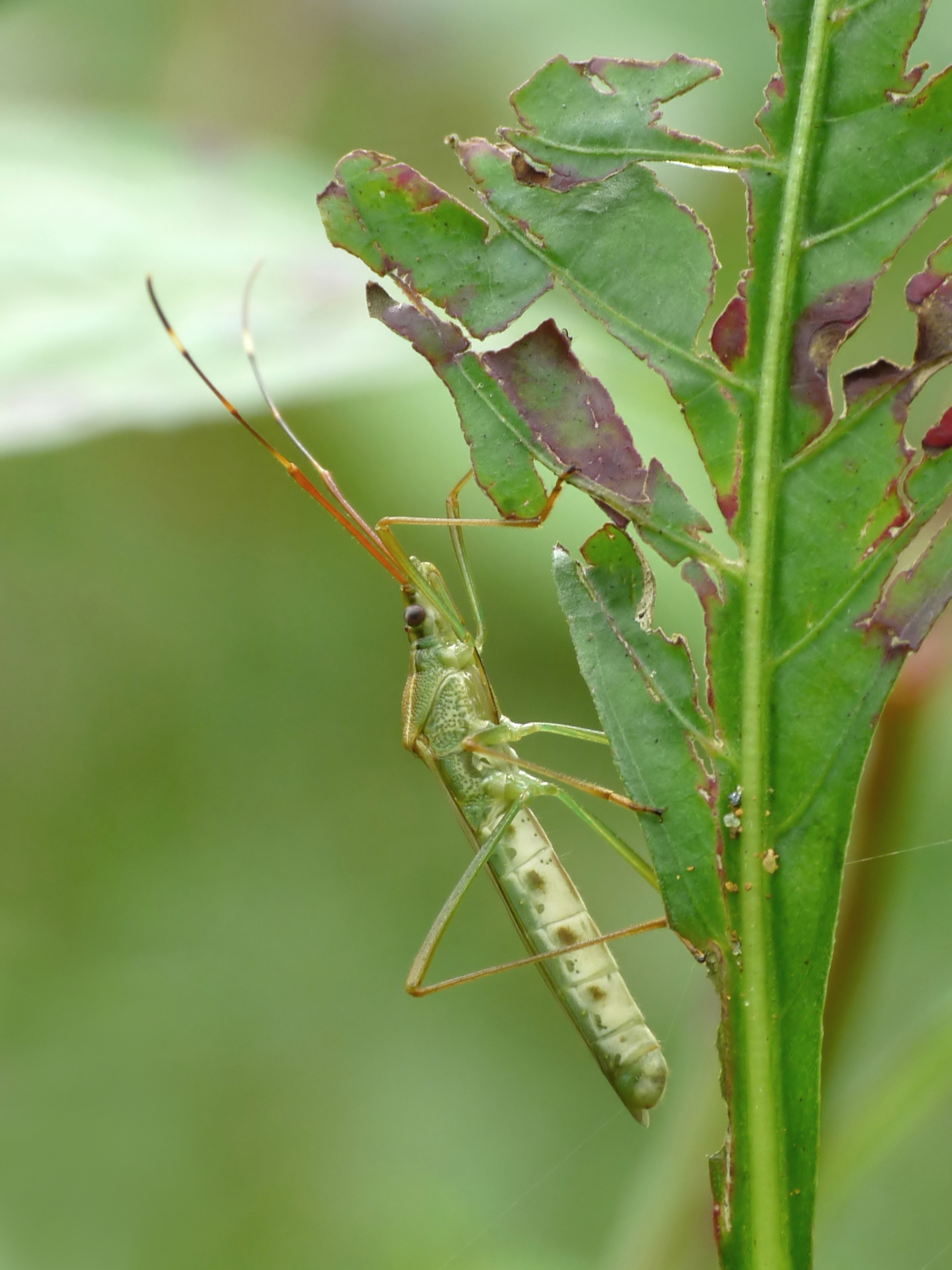

Scientific classification
- Domain: Eukaryota
- Kingdom: Animalia
- Phylum: Arthropoda
- Class: Insecta
- Order: Hemiptera
- Suborder: Heteroptera
- Family: Alydidae
- Genus: Leptocorisa
- Species: L. oratoria

Binomial name
- Leptocorisa oratoria (Fabricius, 1764)

Synonyms
- Leptocorisa bengalensis Westwood, 1842; Leptocorisa maculiventris Dallas, 1852; Leptocorisa trinotata (Herrich-Schäffer, 1846)

= Leptocorisa oratoria =

Rice ear bug

Species of true bug

Leptocorisa oratoria, the rice ear bug, is an insect from the family Alydidae, the broad-headed bugs. This species is commonly confused with Leptocorisa acuta, and other similar, related "rice bug" genera and species.

== Description ==
It has a slender body, around 2 cm in length, with long legs and a long proboscis. It is yellow-brown in color.

== Behaviour ==
When disturbed, the bug gives off an unpleasant smell in defense.

Females lay around 100–200 eggs on the leaves of the rice plant (Oryza sativa). The eggs hatch into green-colored nymphs, which gradually turn brown as they grow into adults. However, these bugs can sometimes be seen feeding on other plants.

== Pest status ==
Rice bugs can be a significant pest to the rice plant, as they feed-on the developing rice ears: reducing crop quality and sometimes yield. Because attacks occur near to harvest, if farmers spray insecticides in an attempt to control outbreaks, they risk leaving harmful pesticide residues on the crop.
