= Protenor belfragei =

Scientific classification
- Domain: Eukaryota
- Kingdom: Animalia
- Phylum: Arthropoda
- Class: Insecta
- Order: Hemiptera
- Suborder: Heteroptera
- Family: Alydidae
- Genus: Protenor
- Species: P. belfragei

Binomial name
- Protenor belfragei Haglund, 1868

Species of true bug

Protenor belfragei is a species of broad-headed bug in the family Alydidae. It is found in North America.
