= Leptocorisa biguttata =

Scientific classification
- Kingdom: Animalia
- Phylum: Arthropoda
- Clade: Pancrustacea
- Class: Insecta
- Order: Hemiptera
- Suborder: Heteroptera
- Family: Alydidae
- Genus: Leptocorisa
- Species: L. biguttata

Binomial name
- Leptocorisa biguttata Walker, 1871

Species of true bug

Leptocorisa biguttata is a species of bug.
