= Leptocorisa timorensis =

Scientific classification
- Kingdom: Animalia
- Phylum: Arthropoda
- Class: Insecta
- Order: Hemiptera
- Suborder: Heteroptera
- Family: Alydidae
- Genus: Leptocorisa
- Species: L. timorensis

Binomial name
- Leptocorisa timorensis Van Doesburg & Siwi, 1983

Species of true bug

Leptocorisa timorensis is a species of bug.
