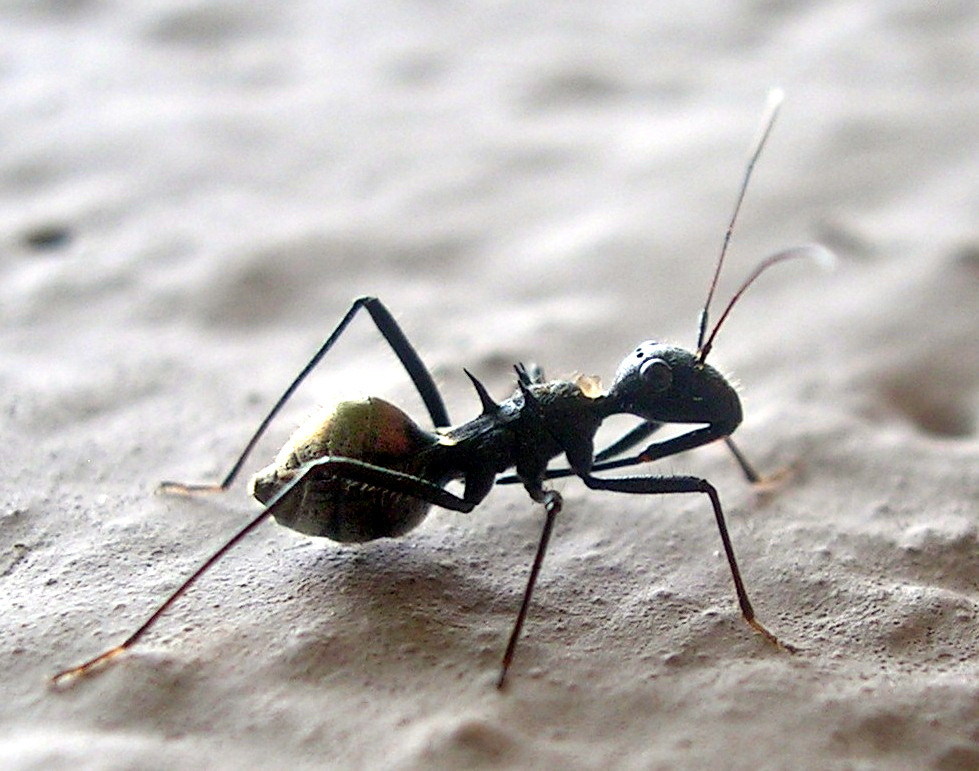

Scientific classification
- Domain: Eukaryota
- Kingdom: Animalia
- Phylum: Arthropoda
- Class: Insecta
- Order: Hemiptera
- Suborder: Heteroptera
- Family: Alydidae
- Subfamily: Micrelytrinae
- Tribe: Micrelytrini
- Genus: Dulichius
- Species: D. inflatus

Binomial name
- Dulichius inflatus (Kirby, 1891)

Synonyms
- Formicoris inflatus Kirby, 1891; Dulichius wroughtoni Bergroth, 1892

= Dulichius inflatus =

Species of true bug

Dulichius inflatus is an ant mimic bug in the family Alydidae that is found mainly in southern India and Sri Lanka. It is said to live in the nests of ants Polyrhachis lacteipennis which it morphologically resembles.

== Description ==
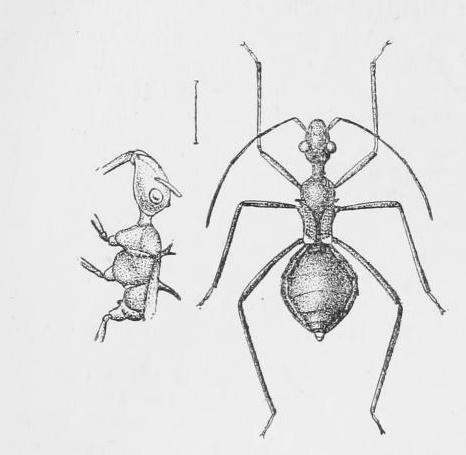

This bug is dull black and has fine hairs on the surface. The tegmina of the wing is short and does not extend beyond the base of the abdomen. The pronotum has spines arising at the base of the wings and another at the tip of the scutellum. The tarsi are paler and the last joint on the mid and hind legs is darker. The abdomen has a velvet-like surface appearance.

== Taxonomy ==
It was described by William Forsell Kirby under the genus Formicoris in the Zoological Journal of the Linnean Society in 1891. Kirby believed that the species belonged in the family Reduviidae. R. C. Wroughton noted that they were frequently found under stones along with colonies of "Polyrhachis spiniger" (a synonym of P. lacteipennis) and that the spine structure varied widely across individuals. A second description under the name of Dulichius wroughtoni was published by Ernst Evald Bergroth but he subsequently discovered that it had already been described by Kirby under a different genus. Bergroth then pointed out that Kirby had incorrectly placed it in the wrong family and noted that it was clearly a member of the already described genus Dulichius in what was then the subfamily Alydinae within the Coreidae.
