= Tollius curtulus =

Scientific classification
- Kingdom: Animalia
- Phylum: Arthropoda
- Clade: Pancrustacea
- Class: Insecta
- Order: Hemiptera
- Suborder: Heteroptera
- Family: Alydidae
- Genus: Tollius
- Species: T. curtulus

Binomial name
- Tollius curtulus (Stål, 1859)

Synonyms
- Alydus curtulus Stål, 1859

Species of true bug

Tollius curtulus is a species of broad-headed bug in the family Alydidae. It is found in Central America and North America.
