= Leptocorisa luzonica =

Scientific classification
- Kingdom: Animalia
- Phylum: Arthropoda
- Class: Insecta
- Order: Hemiptera
- Suborder: Heteroptera
- Family: Alydidae
- Genus: Leptocorisa
- Species: L. luzonica

Binomial name
- Leptocorisa luzonica Ahmad, 1965

Species of true bug

Leptocorisa luzonica is a species of bug.
