= Leptocorisa chinensis =

Scientific classification
- Kingdom: Animalia
- Phylum: Arthropoda
- Clade: Pancrustacea
- Class: Insecta
- Order: Hemiptera
- Suborder: Heteroptera
- Family: Alydidae
- Genus: Leptocorisa
- Species: L. chinensis

Binomial name
- Leptocorisa chinensis Dallas, 1852

Species of true bug

Leptocorisa chinensis is a species of bug.
