= Tollius setosus =

Scientific classification
- Domain: Eukaryota
- Kingdom: Animalia
- Phylum: Arthropoda
- Class: Insecta
- Order: Hemiptera
- Suborder: Heteroptera
- Family: Alydidae
- Genus: Tollius
- Species: T. setosus

Binomial name
- Tollius setosus Van Duzee, 1906

Species of true bug

Tollius setosus is a species of broad-headed bug in the family Alydidae. It is found in North America.
