= Hyalymenus longispinus =

Scientific classification
- Kingdom: Animalia
- Phylum: Arthropoda
- Clade: Pancrustacea
- Class: Insecta
- Order: Hemiptera
- Suborder: Heteroptera
- Family: Alydidae
- Genus: Hyalymenus
- Species: H. longispinus

Binomial name
- Hyalymenus longispinus Stål, 1870

Species of true bug

Hyalymenus longispinus is a species of broad-headed bug in the family Alydidae. It is found in the Caribbean Sea, North America, and the Caribbean.
