= Leptocorisa lepida =

Scientific classification
- Kingdom: Animalia
- Phylum: Arthropoda
- Clade: Pancrustacea
- Class: Insecta
- Order: Hemiptera
- Suborder: Heteroptera
- Family: Alydidae
- Genus: Leptocorisa
- Species: L. lepida

Binomial name
- Leptocorisa lepida Breddin, 1909

Species of true bug

Leptocorisa lepida is a species of bug of the family Alydidae.
