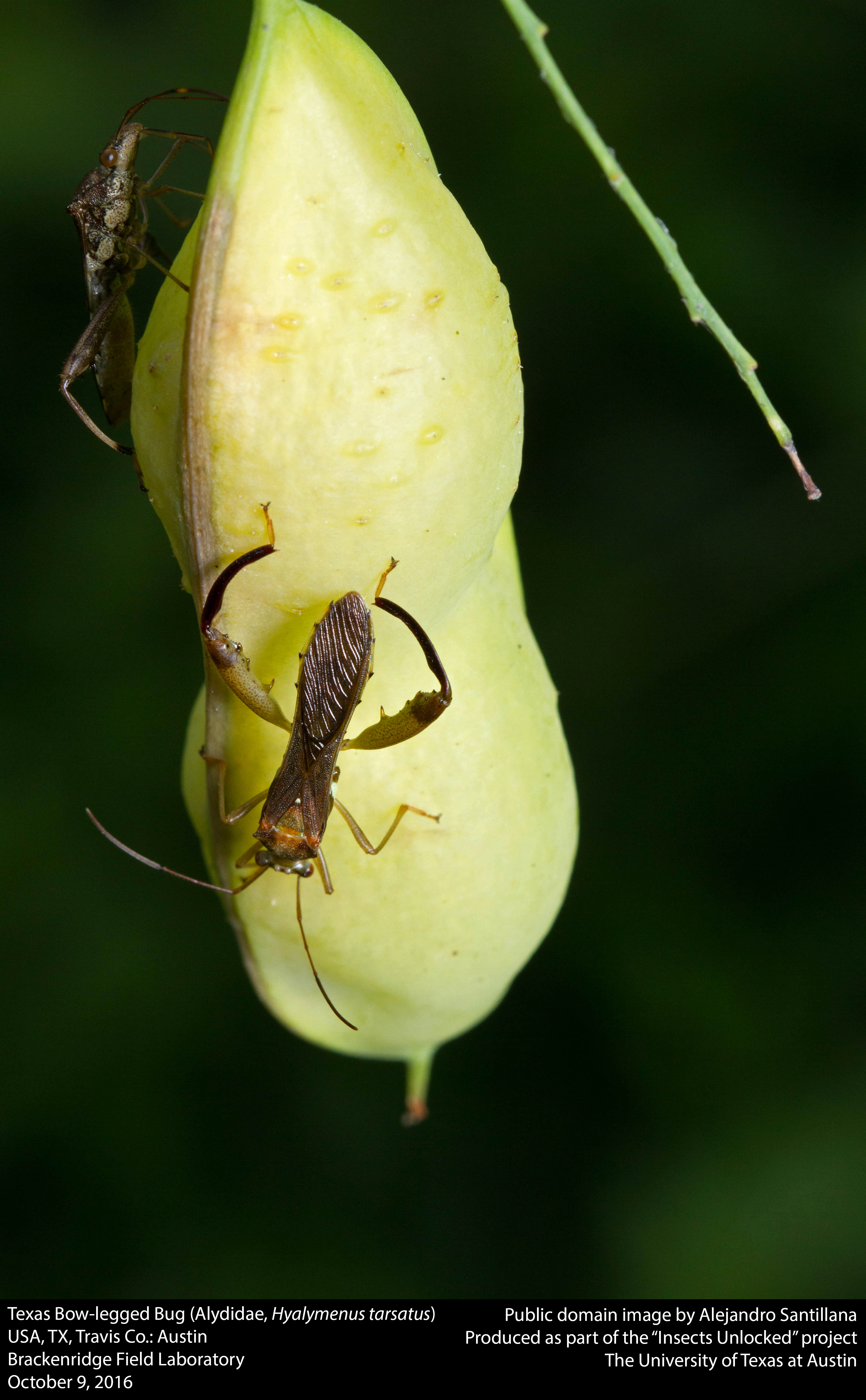

Scientific classification
- Domain: Eukaryota
- Kingdom: Animalia
- Phylum: Arthropoda
- Class: Insecta
- Order: Hemiptera
- Suborder: Heteroptera
- Family: Alydidae
- Genus: Hyalymenus
- Species: H. tarsatus

Binomial name
- Hyalymenus tarsatus (Fabricius, 1803)

= Hyalymenus tarsatus =

Species of true bug

Hyalymenus tarsatus, the Texas bow-legged bug, is a species of broad-headed bug in the family Alydidae. It is found in Central America, North America, and South America.

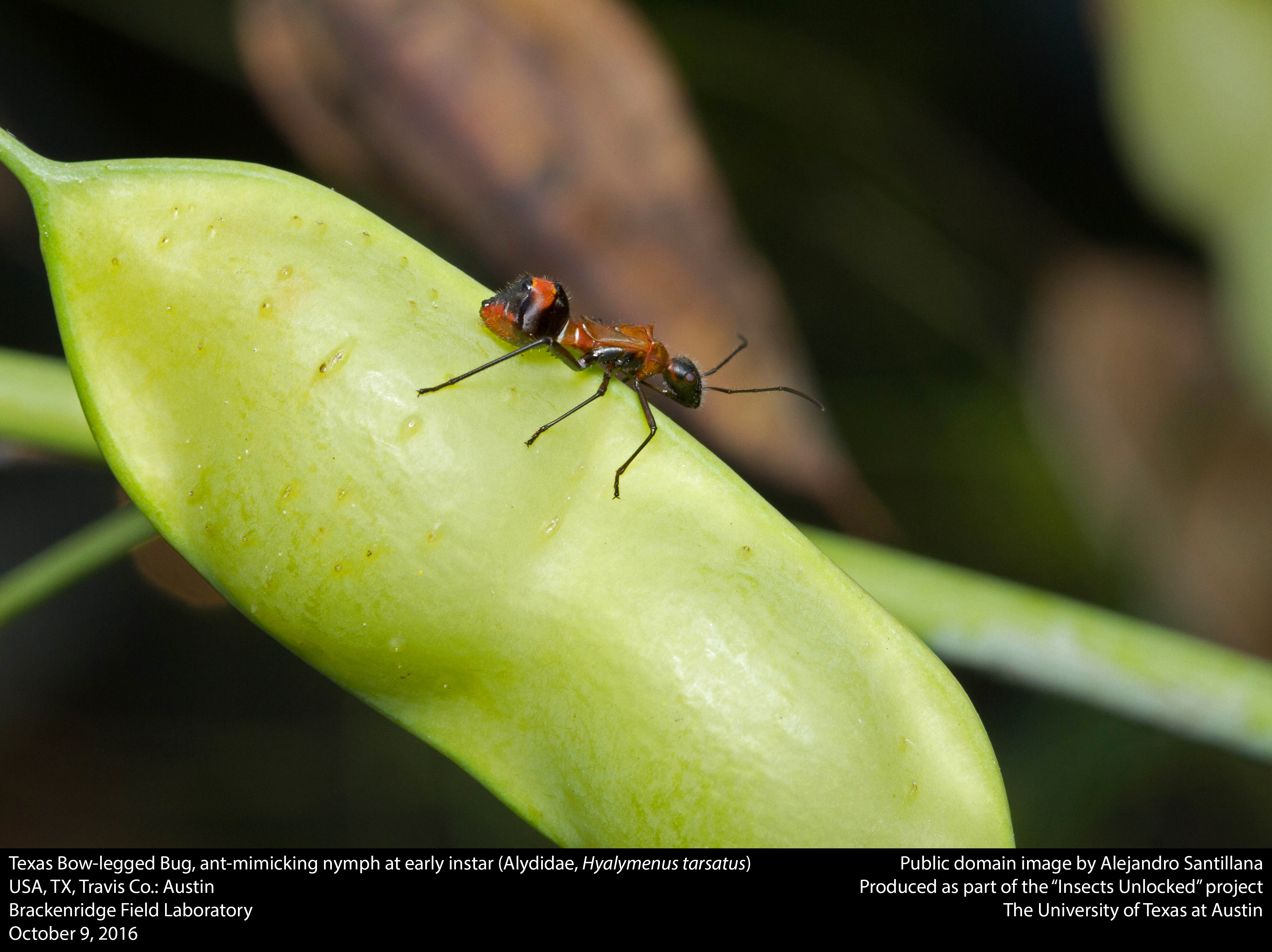

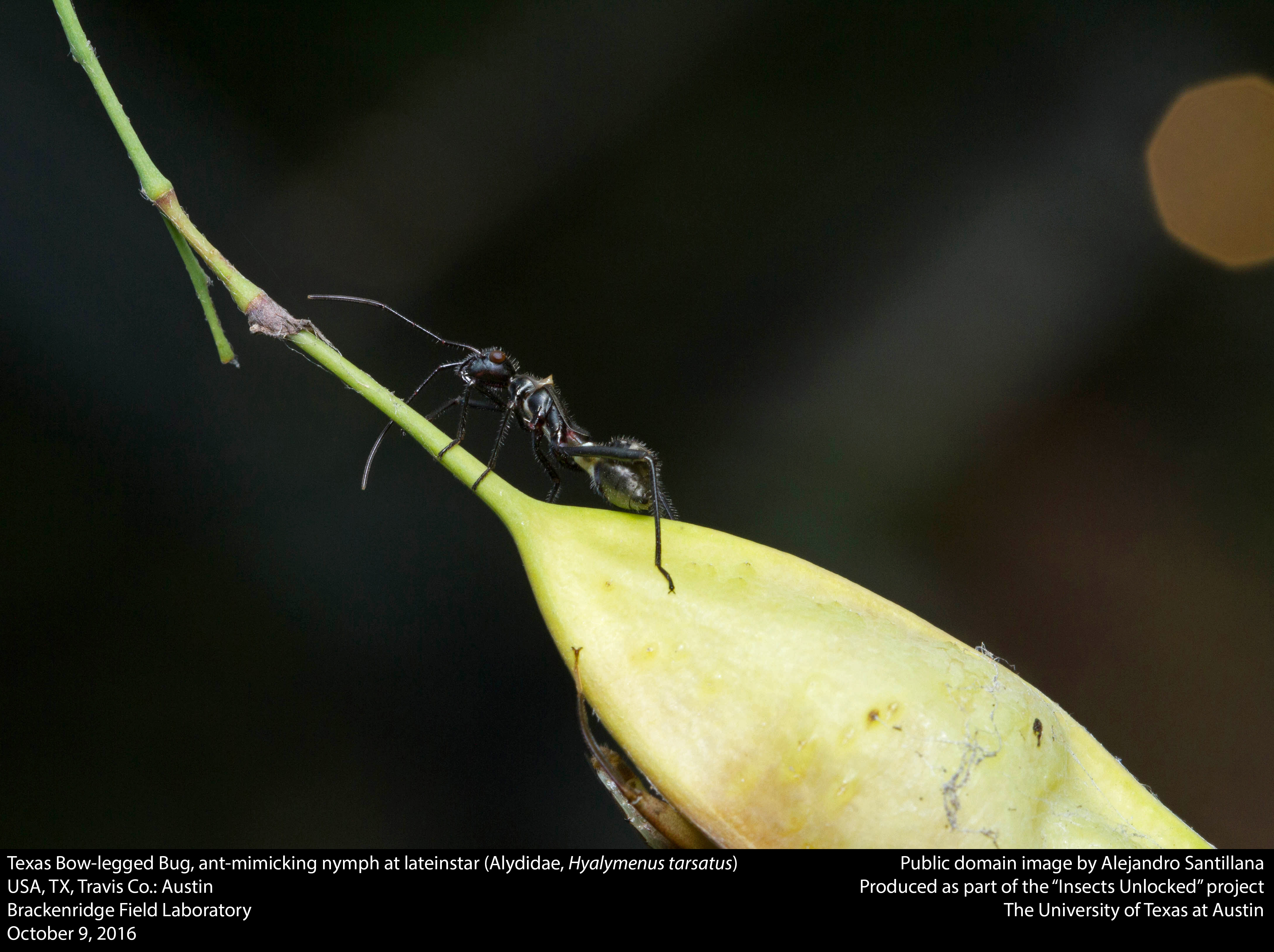
