= Hyalymenus subinermis =

Scientific classification
- Domain: Eukaryota
- Kingdom: Animalia
- Phylum: Arthropoda
- Class: Insecta
- Order: Hemiptera
- Suborder: Heteroptera
- Family: Alydidae
- Genus: Hyalymenus
- Species: H. subinermis

Binomial name
- Hyalymenus subinermis Van Duzee, 1923

Species of true bug

Hyalymenus subinermis is a species of broad-headed bug in the family Alydidae. It is found in Central America and North America.
