= Leptocorisa bipunctata =

Scientific classification
- Kingdom: Animalia
- Phylum: Arthropoda
- Clade: Pancrustacea
- Class: Insecta
- Order: Hemiptera
- Suborder: Heteroptera
- Family: Alydidae
- Genus: Leptocorisa
- Species: L. bipunctata

Binomial name
- Leptocorisa bipunctata Costa, 1863

Species of true bug

Leptocorisa bipunctata is a species of bug.
