= Tollius (bug) =

Scientific classification
- Kingdom: Animalia
- Phylum: Arthropoda
- Clade: Pancrustacea
- Class: Insecta
- Order: Hemiptera
- Suborder: Heteroptera
- Family: Alydidae
- Subfamily: Alydinae
- Genus: Tollius; Stål, 1870

Genus of true bugs

Tollius is a genus of broad-headed bugs in the family Alydidae. There are at least four described species in Tollius.

== Species ==
These four species belong to the genus Tollius:

- Tollius curtulus (Stål, 1859)
- Tollius quadratus Van Duzee, 1921
- Tollius setosus Van Duzee, 1906
- Tollius vanduzeei Torre-Bueno, 1940
