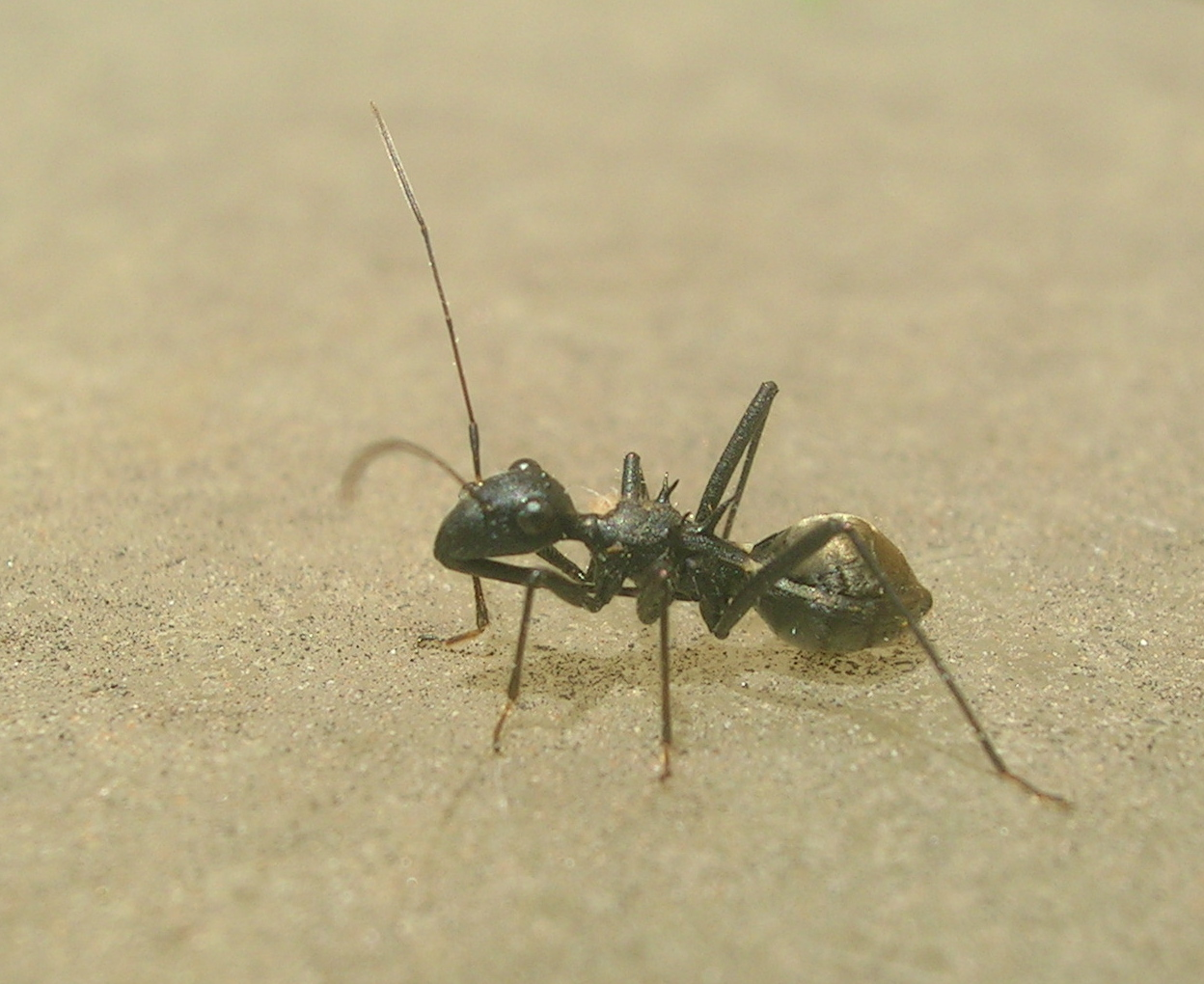

Scientific classification
- Domain: Eukaryota
- Kingdom: Animalia
- Phylum: Arthropoda
- Class: Insecta
- Order: Hemiptera
- Suborder: Heteroptera
- Family: Alydidae
- Subfamily: Micrelytrinae
- Tribe: Micrelytrini
- Genus: Dulichius; Stål, 1866

Synonyms
- Formicoris Kirby, 1891

= Dulichius =

Genus of true bugs

Dulichius is a genus of bugs in the family Alydidae and tribe Micrelytrini. It is notable for species which are ant mimics.

== Species ==
The Coreoidea Species File lists:

- Dulichius baptisti Fernando, 1957
- Dulichius concolor Bergroth, 1912
- Dulichius cruszi Fernando, 1957
- Dulichius culani Fernando, 1957
- Dulichius gemellus Haglund, 1895
- Dulichius inflatus (Kirby, 1891)
- Dulichius katangensis Schouteden, 1913
- Dulichius macrocephalus Villiers, 1950
- Dulichius similis Linnavuori, 1987
- Dulichius sinhaladvipa Fernando, 1957
- Dulichius tambapanni Fernando, 1957
- Dulichius tanamalwila Fernando, 1957
- Dulichius thompsoni Distant, 1903
- Dulichius trispinosus Stål, 1866 - type species
