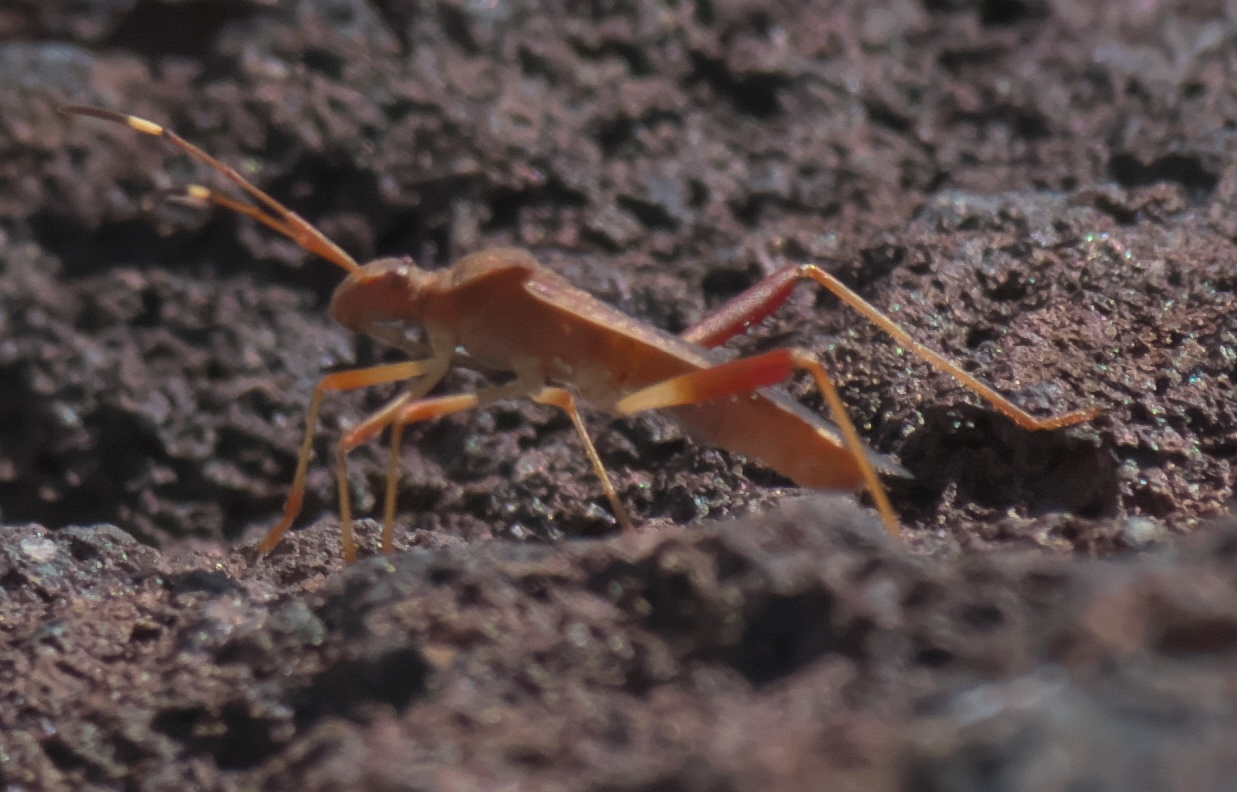
- Megalotomus quinquespinosus

Scientific classification
- Kingdom: Animalia
- Phylum: Arthropoda
- Clade: Pancrustacea
- Class: Insecta
- Order: Hemiptera
- Suborder: Heteroptera
- Family: Alydidae
- Subfamily: Alydinae
- Genus: Megalotomus; Fieber, 1860

= Megalotomus =

Genus of true bugs

Megalotomus is a genus of broad-headed bugs in the family Alydidae. There are about eight described species in Megalotomus.

== Species ==
These eight species belong to the genus Megalotomus:

- Megalotomus acutulus Liu & Liu, 1998
- Megalotomus castaneus Reuter, 1888
- Megalotomus costalis Stål, 1873
- Megalotomus junceus (Scopoli, 1763)
- Megalotomus obtusus Ghauri, 1972
- Megalotomus ornaticeps (Stål, 1858)
- Megalotomus quinquespinosus (Say, 1825) (lupine bug)
- Megalotomus zaitzevi Kerzhner, 1972
