= Slateria =

Scientific classification
- Domain: Eukaryota
- Kingdom: Animalia
- Phylum: Arthropoda
- Class: Insecta
- Order: Hemiptera
- Suborder: Heteroptera
- Family: Alydidae
- Subfamily: Micrelytrinae
- Tribe: Micrelytrini
- Genus: Slateria; Ahmad, 1965

Genus of true bugs

Slateria is a monotypic genus of bugs, in the subfamily Micrelytrinae and tribe Micrelytrini; it contains the species Slateria granti from Myanmar.

== Note and Links ==
- Slateria is a synonym of the Asian plant genus Ophiopogon
- Data related to Slateria at Wikispecies
