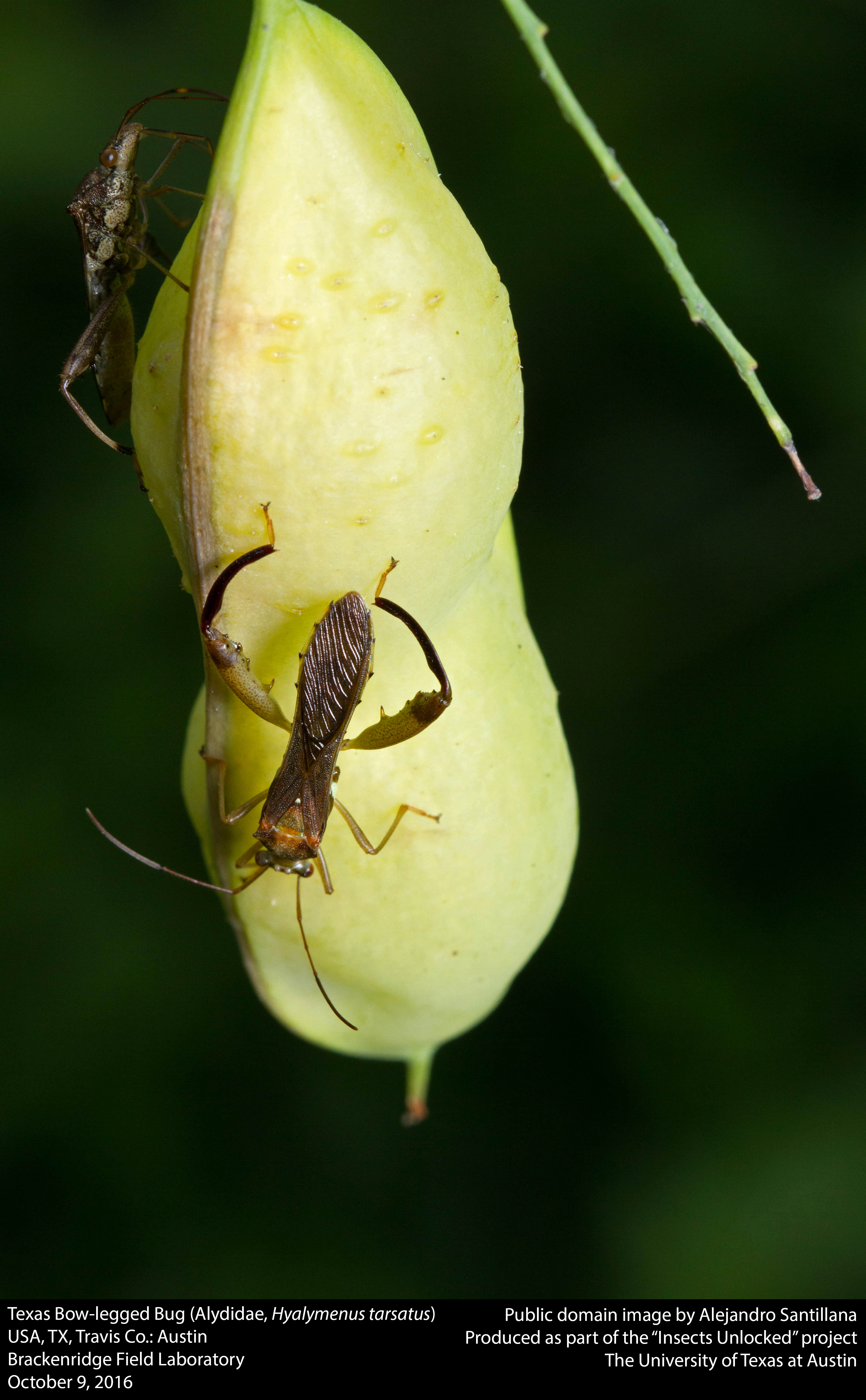
- Hyalymenus tarsatus

Scientific classification
- Domain: Eukaryota
- Kingdom: Animalia
- Phylum: Arthropoda
- Class: Insecta
- Order: Hemiptera
- Suborder: Heteroptera
- Family: Alydidae
- Subfamily: Alydinae
- Genus: Hyalymenus; Amyot & Serville, 1843

Synonyms
- Galeottus Distant, 1893

= Hyalymenus =

Genus of true bugs

Hyalymenus is a genus of broad-headed bugs in the family Alydidae. There are about 6 described species in Hyalymenus.

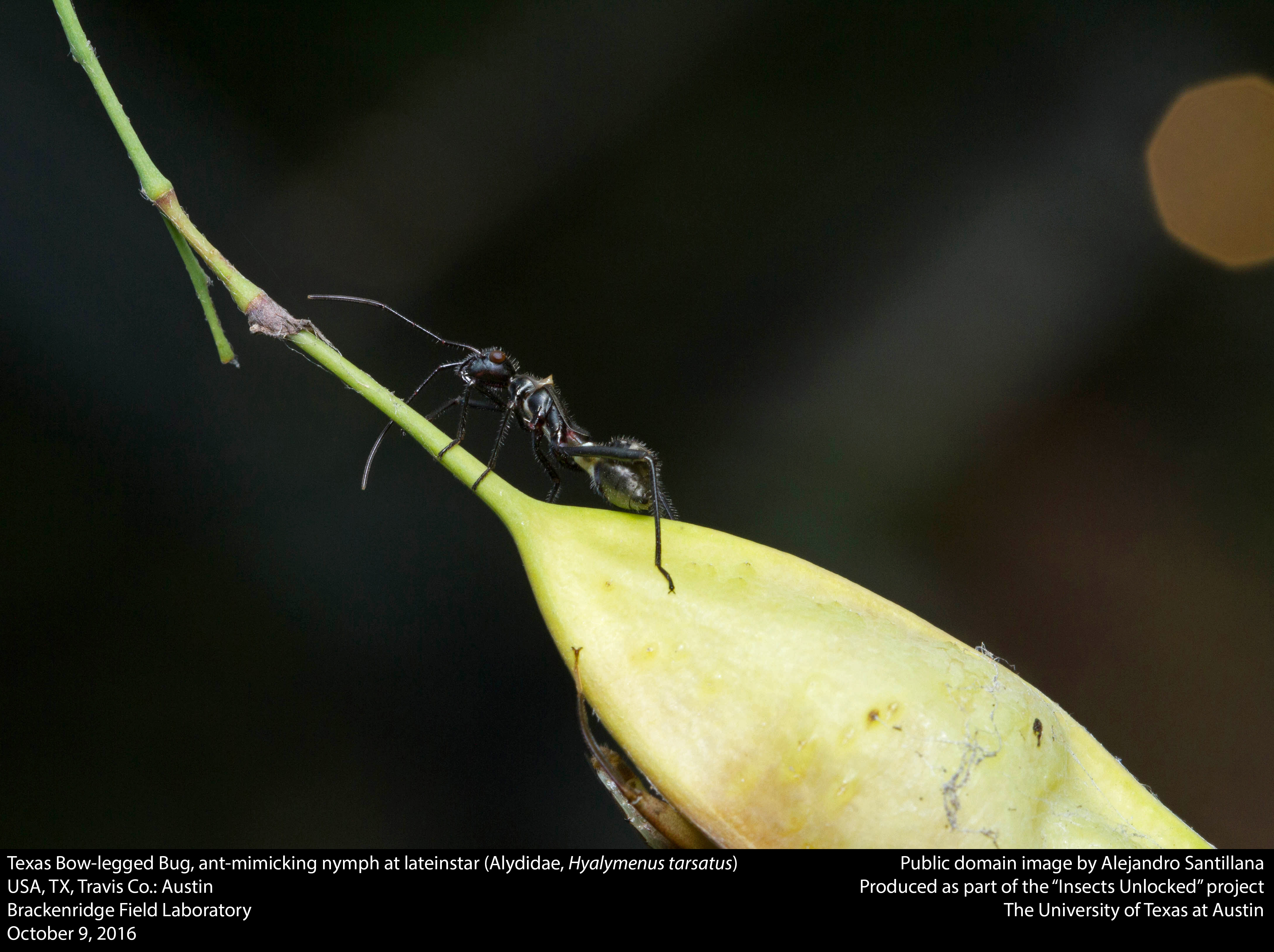
Hyalymenus tarsatus

== Species ==
- Hyalymenus dentatus (Fabricius, 1803)
- Hyalymenus longispinus Stål, 1870
- Hyalymenus notatus Torre-Bueno, 1939
- Hyalymenus potens Torre-Bueno, 1939
- Hyalymenus subinermis Van Duzee, 1923
- Hyalymenus tarsatus (Fabricius, 1803) (Texas bow-legged bug)
