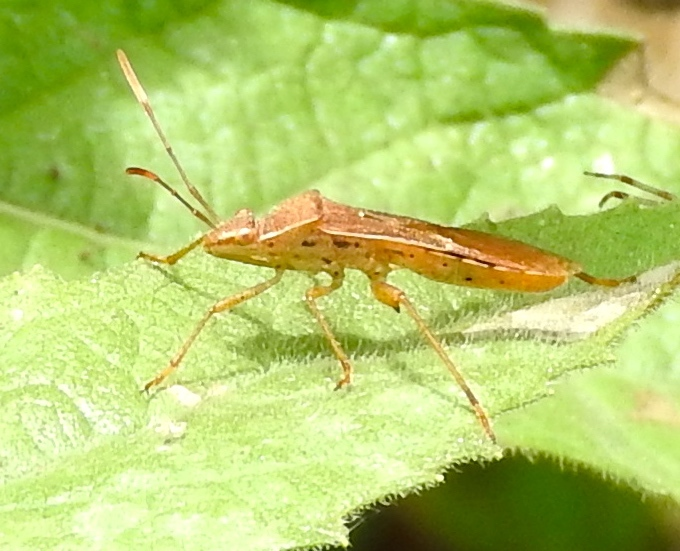
- Image of Burtinus

Scientific classification
- Kingdom: Animalia
- Phylum: Arthropoda
- Class: Insecta
- Order: Hemiptera
- Suborder: Heteroptera
- Family: Alydidae
- Subfamily: Alydinae
- Genus: Burtinus; Stål, 1859

= Burtinus =

Genus of true bugs

Burtinus is a genus of broad-headed bugs in the family Alydidae. There are at least two described species in Burtinus.

== Species ==
These two species belong to the genus Burtinus:

- Burtinus luteomarginatus Maldonado Capriles, 1953
- Burtinus notatipennis Stål, 1859
