= Rice bug =

The term rice bug may apply to a number of species in at least three bug genera that attack rice: especially at the later panicle stages. They include:

- Species in the genus Leptocorisa,
- Oebalus pugnax a.k.a. the rice stink bug,
- Species in the genus Stenocoris.
