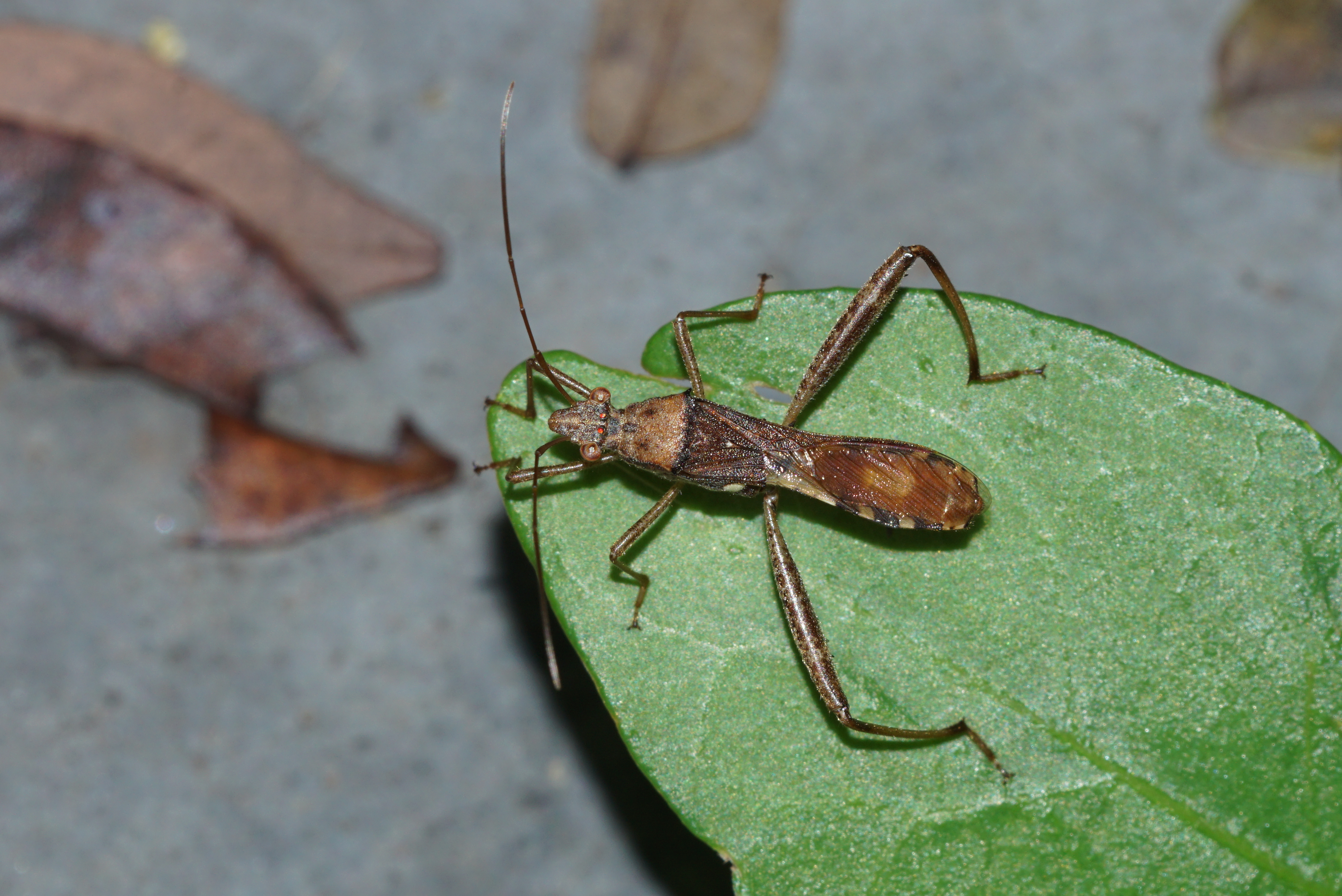
- Riptortus linearis

Scientific classification
- Kingdom: Animalia
- Phylum: Arthropoda
- Clade: Pancrustacea
- Class: Insecta
- Order: Hemiptera
- Suborder: Heteroptera
- Family: Alydidae
- Subfamily: Alydinae
- Genus: Riptortus; Stål, 1860

= Riptortus =

Genus of true bugs

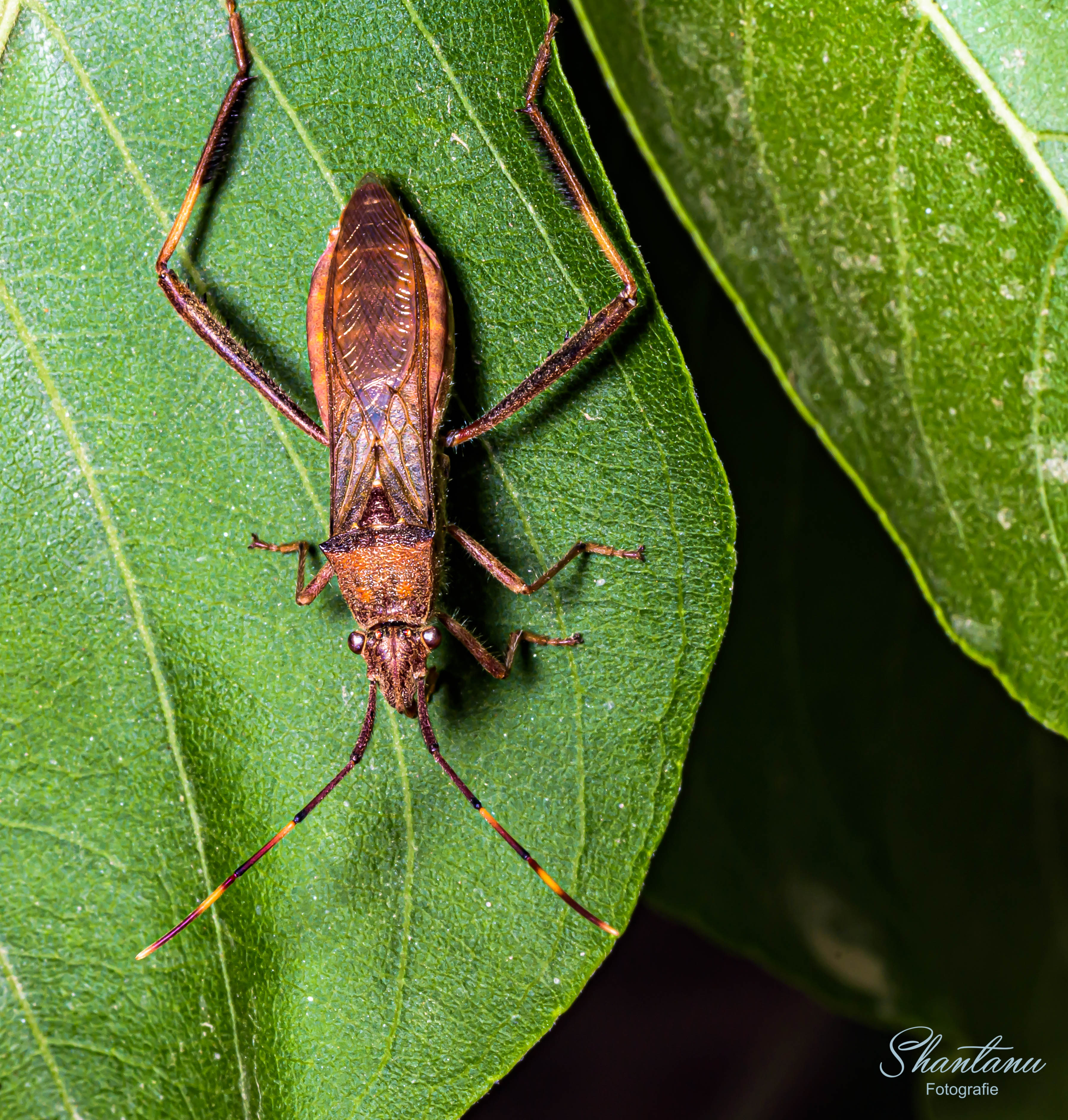
Riptortus sp

Riptortus is a genus of broad-headed bugs in the family Alydidae. There are more than 20 described species in Riptortus.

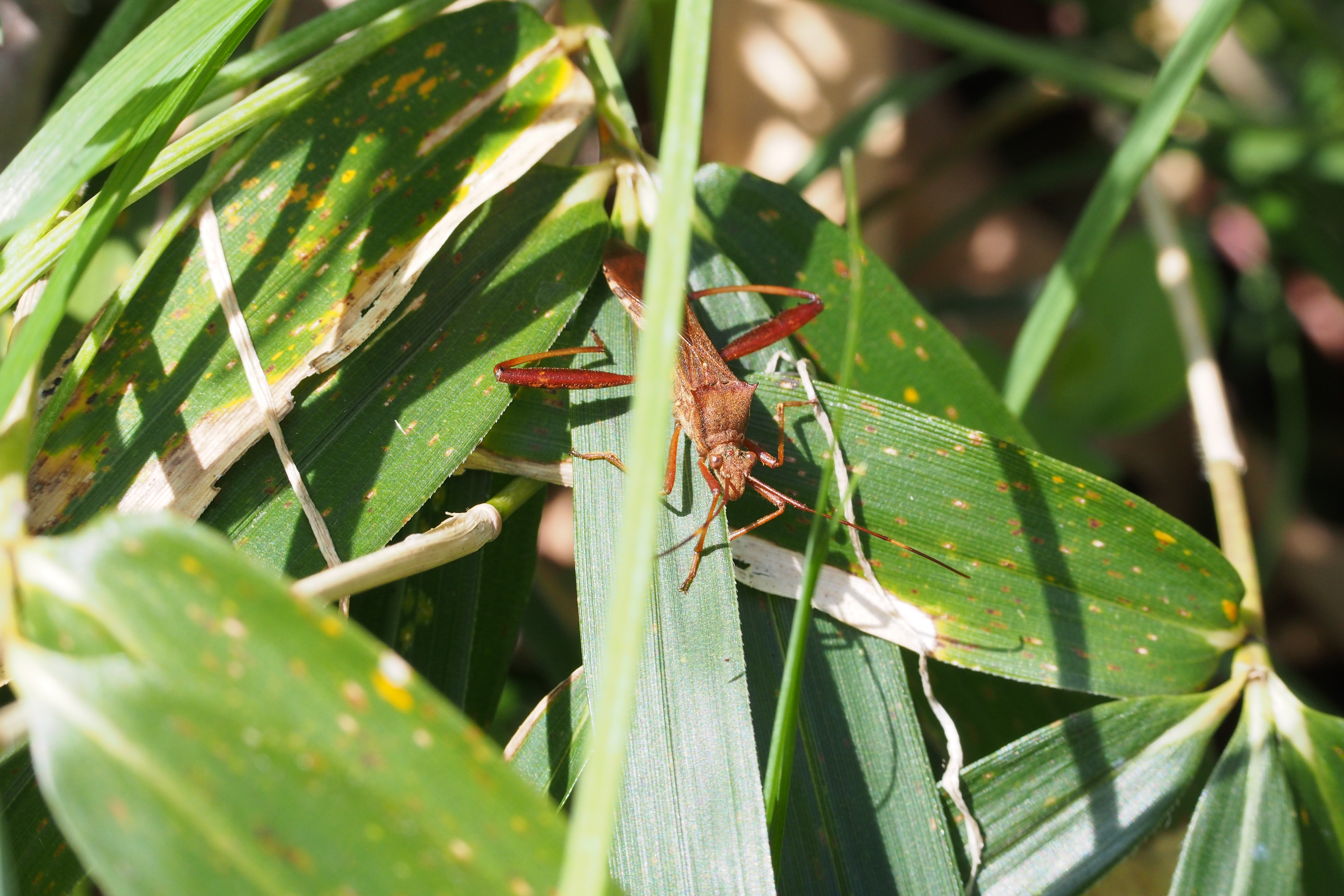
Riptortus pedestris

== Species ==
These 27 species belong to the genus Riptortus:

- Riptortus abdominalis (Westwood, 1842)
- Riptortus acantharis (Dallas, 1852)
- Riptortus aegyptiacus Lindberg, 1939
- Riptortus annulicornis (Guérin-Méneville, 1831)
- Riptortus decisus (Walker, 1871)
- Riptortus dentipes (Fabricius, 1787)
- Riptortus distinguendus Blöte, 1934
- Riptortus eugeniae (Stål, 1859)
- Riptortus fabricii (Signoret, 1861)
- Riptortus flavovittatus (Stål, 1855)
- Riptortus fuliginosus Blöte & Hagenbach, 1934
- Riptortus imperialis Kirkaldy, 1905
- Riptortus insularis China, 1930
- Riptortus linearis (Fabricius, 1775)
- Riptortus longipes (Dallas, 1852)
- Riptortus macleani Schaffner, 1963
- Riptortus masculus Breddin, 1901
- Riptortus oxianus Kiritshenko, 1914
- Riptortus parvus Hsiao, 1964
- Riptortus pedestris (Fabricius, 1775) (Bean Bug)
- Riptortus pilosus (Thunberg, 1783)
- Riptortus rubronotatus Blöte, 1934
- Riptortus ryukyuensis Kikuhara, 2005
- Riptortus saileri Usinger, 1952
- Riptortus serripes (Fabricius, 1775)
- Riptortus stalii (Signoret, 1858)
- Riptortus strenuus Horváth, 1889
