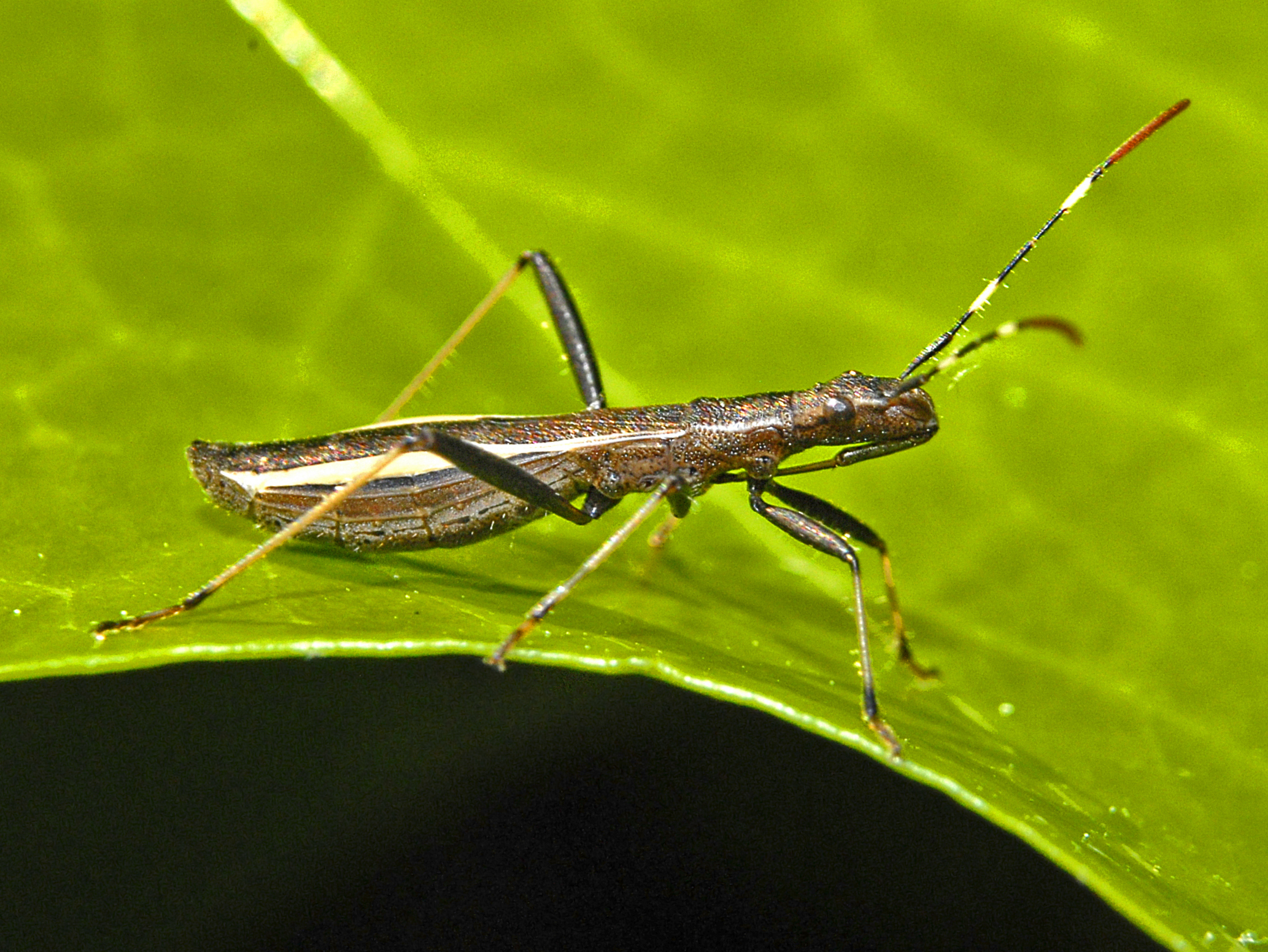
- Micrelytra fossularum. Lateral view
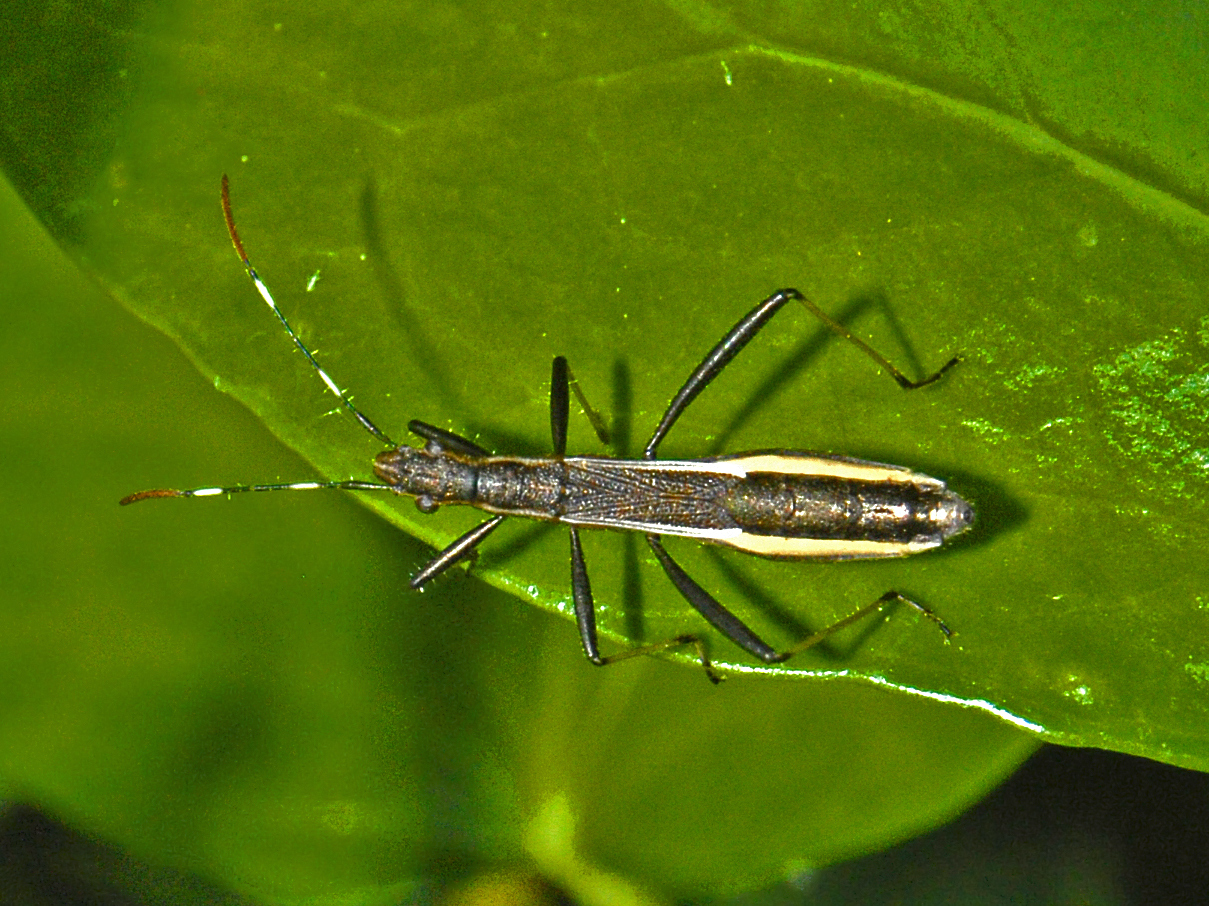
- Dorsal view

Scientific classification
- Domain: Eukaryota
- Kingdom: Animalia
- Phylum: Arthropoda
- Class: Insecta
- Order: Hemiptera
- Suborder: Heteroptera
- Family: Alydidae
- Subfamily: Micrelytrinae
- Tribe: Micrelytrini
- Genus: Micrelytra; Laporte, 1833
- Species: M. fossularum

Binomial name
- Micrelytra fossularum (Rossi, 1790)

Synonyms
- Cimex fossularum Rossi, 1790; Gerris fossularum Fab. 1798); Hydrometra fossularum Fab. 1803); Alydus apterus L. 1827; Actorus fossularum Burm. 1835

= Micrelytra =

Genus of true bugs

Micrelytra fossularum is a species of European bugs belonging to the family Alydidae and type genus of the tribe Micrelytrini. It is the only representative of the monotypic genus Micrelytra.

== Description ==
Micrelytra fossularum can reach a length of about 10–12 millimetres (0.39–0.47 in). It has a slender body with a significant thickening in the abdomen and quite thin legs. The basic color is brown or yellowish, with two white lateral lines along the abdomen. The head is broad, similar in length and width to the pronotum and the scutellum. The compound eyes are globular and protruding. The antennal segments are alternately black and white, but the last one is red, elongated and curved. The hemelytra are greatly reduced (hence the name of the genus) and have a thin white line around the outside edge. These vestigial wings makes this bug incapable of flight. The female is bigger and larger than the male.

== Behaviour ==
These true bugs form large colonies on Poaceae (mainly Dactylis glomerata and Poa annua). They feed on the nutritious fluids contained in seeds, that they reach with their proboscis. The females lay eggs in April and May. The adults can be found in August, at the end of various larval stages.

== Distribution ==
This species is present in the Mediterranean regions, mainly in Albania, Belgium, Croatia, France, Greece, Italy, Portugal, Slovenia, Spain and former Yugoslavia. It prefers xerophytic meadows.
