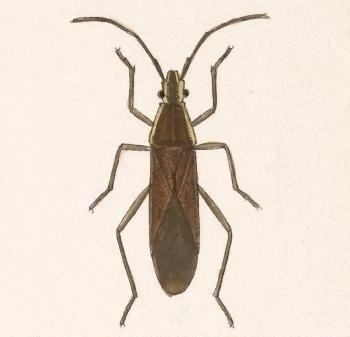
- Darmistus subvittatus

Scientific classification
- Domain: Eukaryota
- Kingdom: Animalia
- Phylum: Arthropoda
- Class: Insecta
- Order: Hemiptera
- Suborder: Heteroptera
- Family: Alydidae
- Subfamily: Micrelytrinae
- Tribe: Micrelytrini
- Genus: Darmistus; Stål, 1860

= Darmistus =

Genus of true bugs

Darmistus is a genus of broad-headed bugs in the family Alydidae. There are at least three described species in Darmistus.

== Species ==
These three species belong to the genus Darmistus:

- Darmistus crassicornis Van Duzee, 1937
- Darmistus duncani Van Duzee, 1937
- Darmistus subvittatus Stål, 1859
