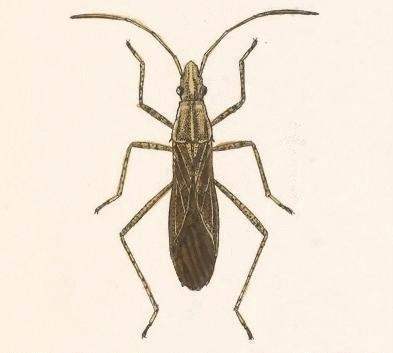
- Cydamus borealis

Scientific classification
- Domain: Eukaryota
- Kingdom: Animalia
- Phylum: Arthropoda
- Class: Insecta
- Order: Hemiptera
- Suborder: Heteroptera
- Family: Alydidae
- Tribe: Micrelytrini
- Genus: Cydamus; Stål, 1860

= Cydamus (bug) =

Genus of true bugs

Cydamus is a genus of broad-headed bugs in the family Alydidae, found in the Americas. There are about 15 described species in Cydamus.

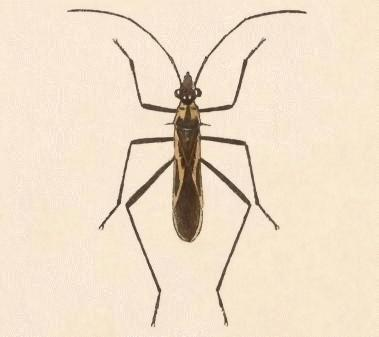
Cydamus inauratus

== Species ==
These 15 species belong to the genus Cydamus:

- Cydamus abditus Van Duzee, 1925^{i c g}
- Cydamus adspersipes Stål, 1860^{i c g}
- Cydamus bolivianus Kormilev, 1953^{c g}
- Cydamus borealis Distant, 1881^{i c g b}
- Cydamus celeripes (Berg, 1883)^{c g}
- Cydamus deauratus Distant, 1893^{c g}
- Cydamus delpontei Kormilev, 1953^{c g}
- Cydamus femoralis Stål, 1860^{c g}
- Cydamus inauratus Distant, 1893^{c g}
- Cydamus kormilevi Schaefer, C. W., 1996^{c g}
- Cydamus lizeri Kormilev, 1953^{c g}
- Cydamus minor Kormilev, 1953^{c g}
- Cydamus picticeps (Stal, 1859)^{c g}
- Cydamus seai Kormilev, 1953^{c g}
- Cydamus trispinosus (De Geer, 1773)^{c g}

Data sources: i = ITIS, c = Catalogue of Life, g = GBIF, b = Bugguide.net
