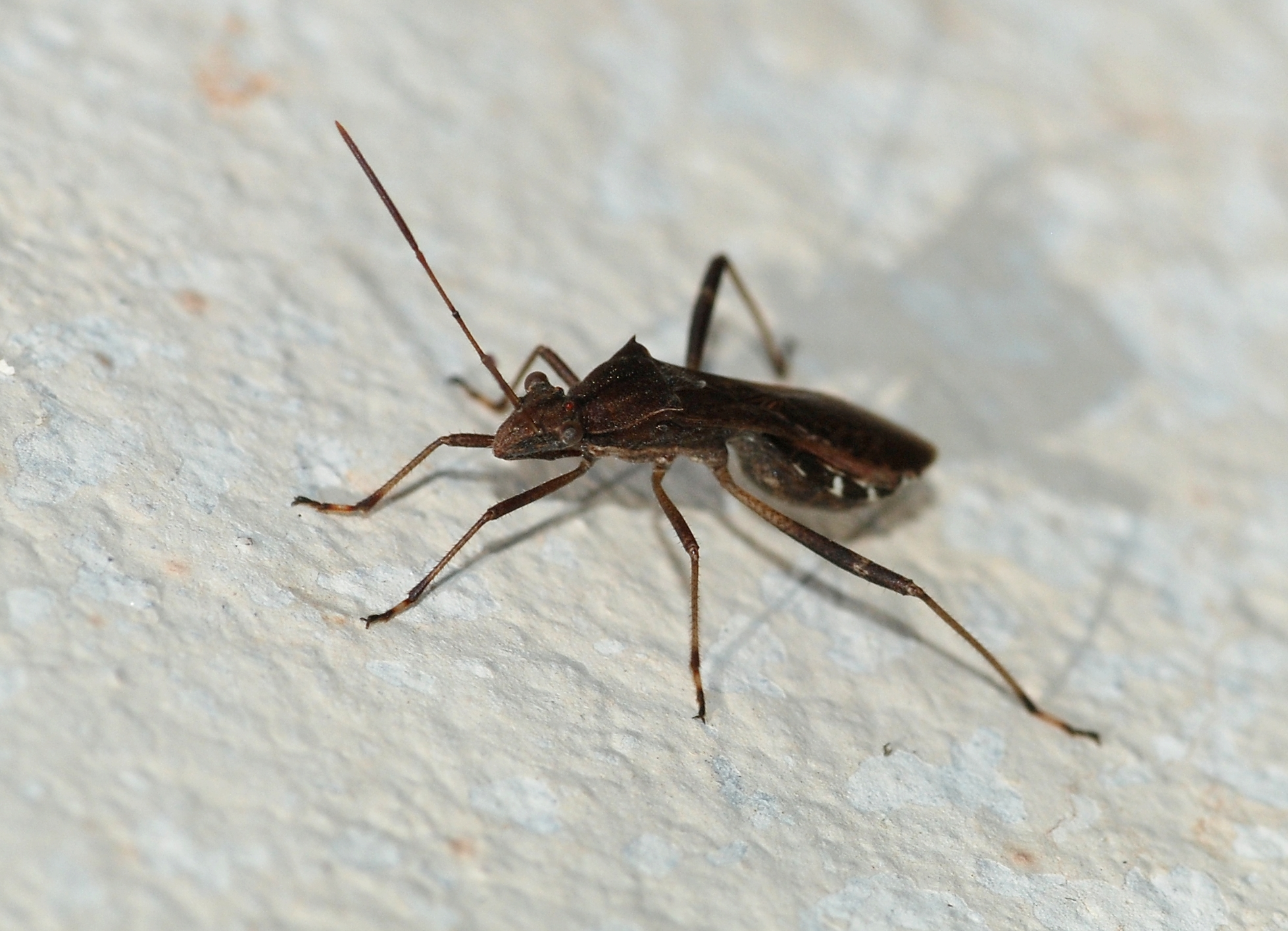

Scientific classification
- Domain: Eukaryota
- Kingdom: Animalia
- Phylum: Arthropoda
- Class: Insecta
- Order: Hemiptera
- Suborder: Heteroptera
- Family: Alydidae
- Subfamily: Alydinae
- Genus: Neomegalotomus; Schaffner & Schaefer, 1998

= Neomegalotomus =

Genus of true bugs

Neomegalotomus is a genus of broad-headed bugs in the family Alydidae. There are at least two described species in Neomegalotomus.

== Species ==
These two species belong to the genus Neomegalotomus:

- Neomegalotomus parvus (Westwood, 1842)
- Neomegalotomus rufipes (Westwood, 1842)
