= Stachyocnemus =

Scientific classification
- Kingdom: Animalia
- Phylum: Arthropoda
- Clade: Pancrustacea
- Class: Insecta
- Order: Hemiptera
- Suborder: Heteroptera
- Family: Alydidae
- Genus: Stachyocnemus; Stål, 1870
- Species: S. apicalis

Binomial name
- Stachyocnemus apicalis (Dallas, 1852)

Genus of true bugs

Stachyocnemus is a genus of broad-headed bugs in the family Alydidae. There is one described species in Stachyocnemus, S. apicalis.
