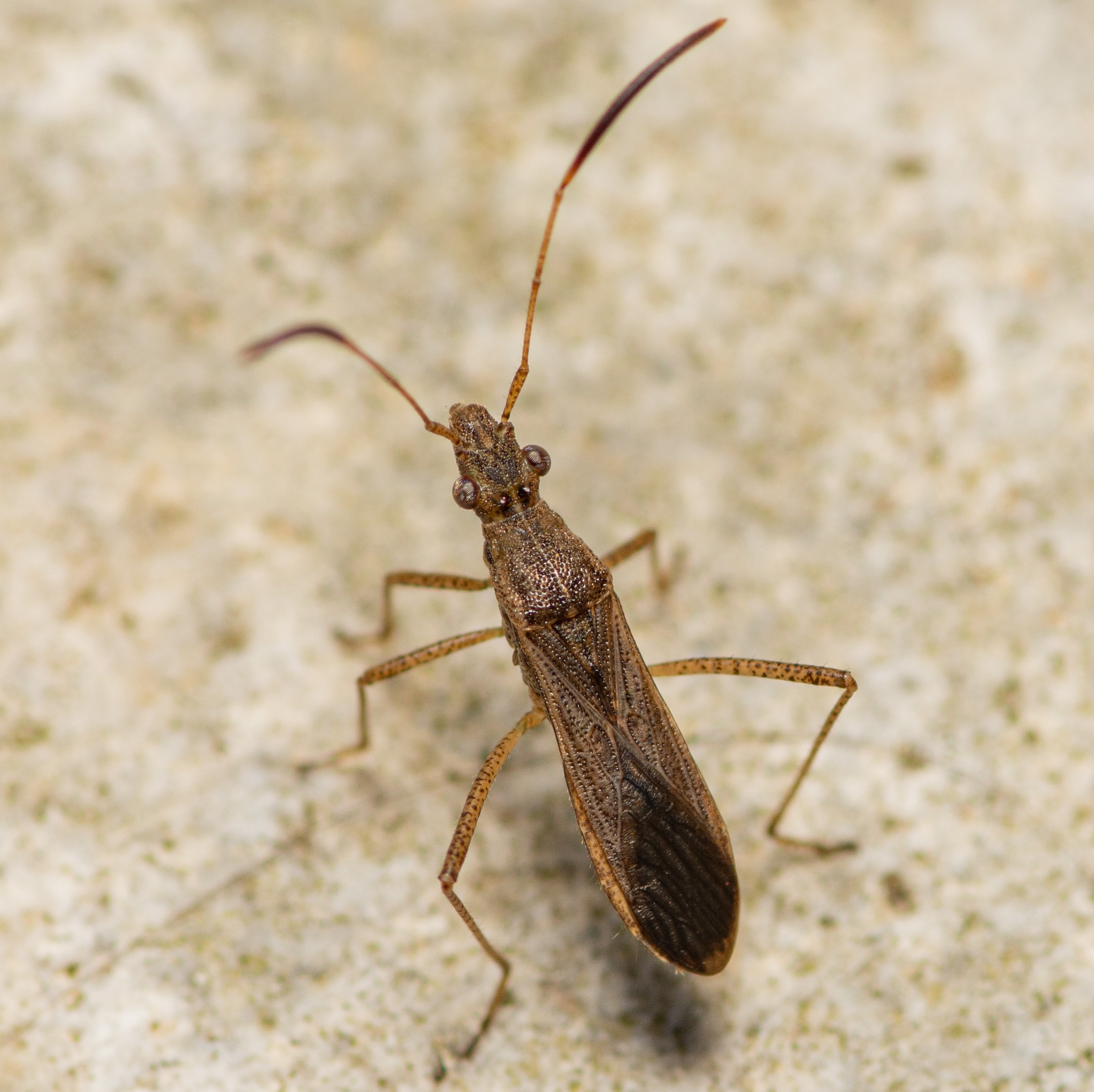
- Esperanza texana

Scientific classification
- Domain: Eukaryota
- Kingdom: Animalia
- Phylum: Arthropoda
- Class: Insecta
- Order: Hemiptera
- Suborder: Heteroptera
- Family: Alydidae
- Tribe: Micrelytrini
- Genus: Esperanza; Barber, 1906

= Esperanza (bug) =

Genus of true bugs

Esperanza is a genus of broad-headed bugs in the family Alydidae. There is at least one described species in Esperanza, E. texana.
