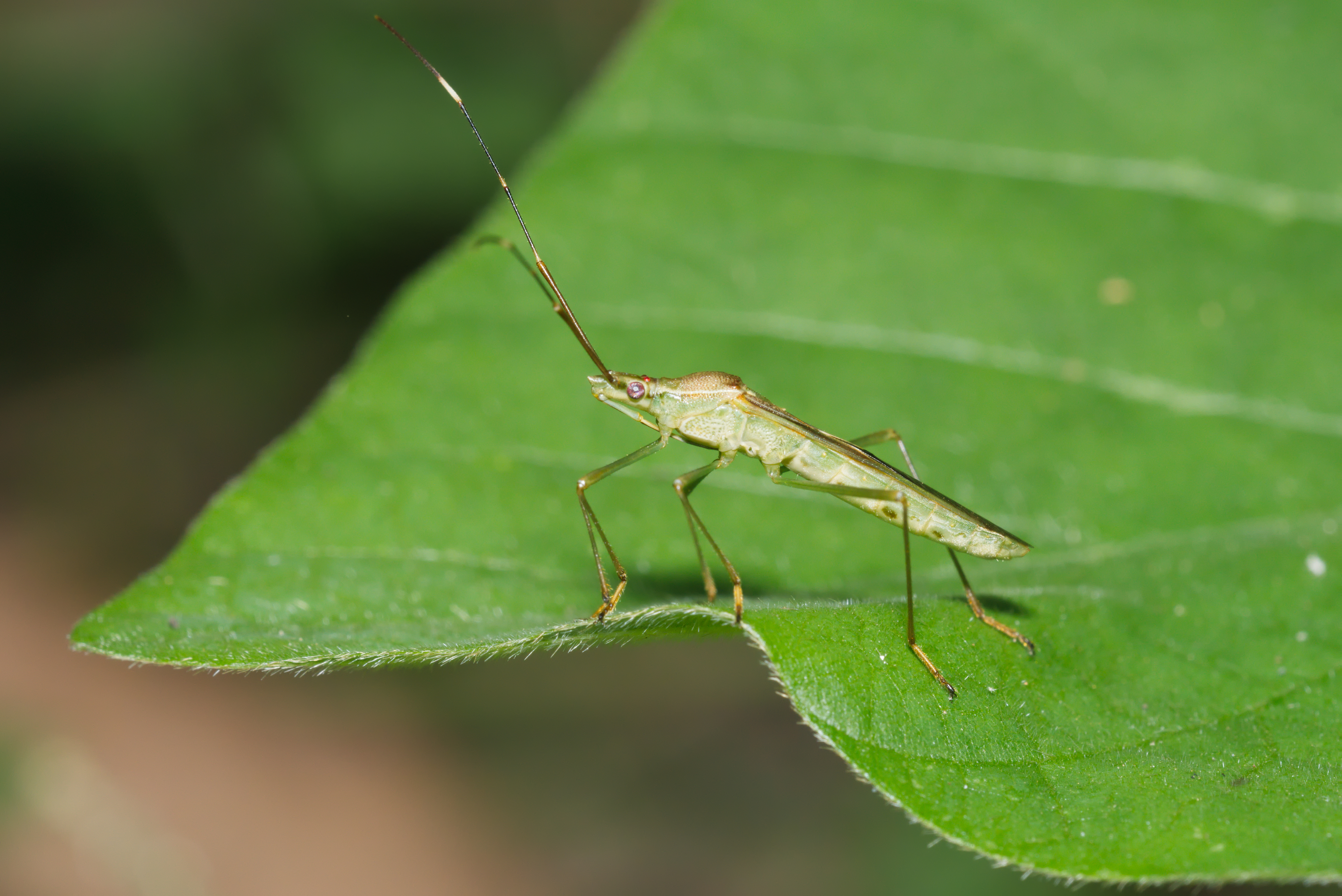
- Leptocorisa oratoria

Scientific classification
- Kingdom: Animalia
- Phylum: Arthropoda
- Class: Insecta
- Order: Hemiptera
- Suborder: Heteroptera
- Family: Alydidae
- Subfamily: Micrelytrinae
- Tribe: Leptocorisini
- Genus: Leptocorisa; Latreille, 1829

Synonyms
- Leptocoris Germar, 1829; Leptocorixa Berthold, 1827; Rhabdocoris Kolenati, 1845

= Leptocorisa =

Genus of true bugs

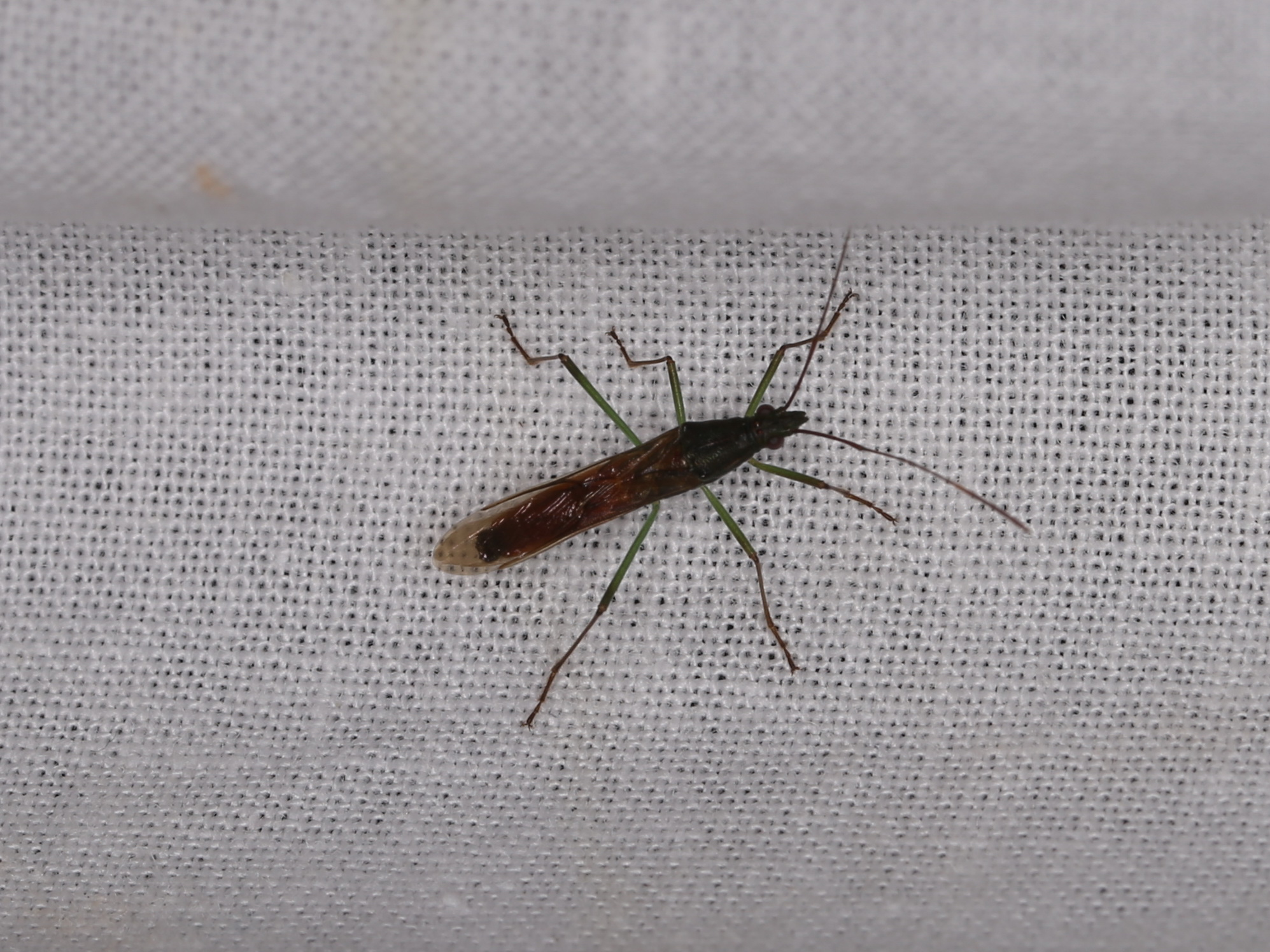
Leptocorisa

Leptocorisa is a genus of broad-headed bugs in the family Alydidae. There are about 17 described species in Leptocorisa, some of which are known as "rice bugs" or gundhi bugs (in India); they are found in south and east Asia and in Oceania.

== Species ==
These 17 species belong to the genus Leptocorisa:

- Leptocorisa acuta (Thunberg, 1783)
- Leptocorisa ayamaruensis Van Doesburg & Siwi, 1983
- Leptocorisa biguttata Walker, 1871
- Leptocorisa bipunctata Costa, 1863
- Leptocorisa chinensis Dallas, 1852
- Leptocorisa costalis Herrich-Schäffer, 1846
- Leptocorisa discoidalis Walker, 1871
- Leptocorisa lepida Breddin, 1909
- Leptocorisa luzonensis Ahmad, 1965
- Leptocorisa luzonica Ahmad, 1965
- Leptocorisa oratoria (Fabricius, 1794)
- Leptocorisa palawanensis Ahmad, 1965
- Leptocorisa pseudolepida Ahmad, 1965
- Leptocorisa sakdapolrakae Ahmad, 1965
- Leptocorisa solomonensis Ahmad, 1965
- Leptocorisa tagalica Ahmad, 1965
- Leptocorisa timorensis Van Doesburg & Siwi, 1983
