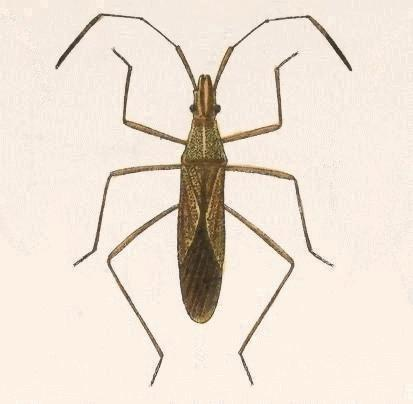
- Protenor tropicalis

Scientific classification
- Domain: Eukaryota
- Kingdom: Animalia
- Phylum: Arthropoda
- Class: Insecta
- Order: Hemiptera
- Suborder: Heteroptera
- Superfamily: Coreoidea
- Family: Alydidae
- Genus: Protenor; Stål, 1867

= Protenor =

Genus of true bugs

Protenor is a genus of broad-headed bugs in the family Alydidae. There are at least three described species in Protenor.

== Species ==
These three species belong to the genus Protenor:

- Protenor australis Hussey, 1925
- Protenor belfragei Haglund, 1868
- Protenor tropicalis Distant, 1881
