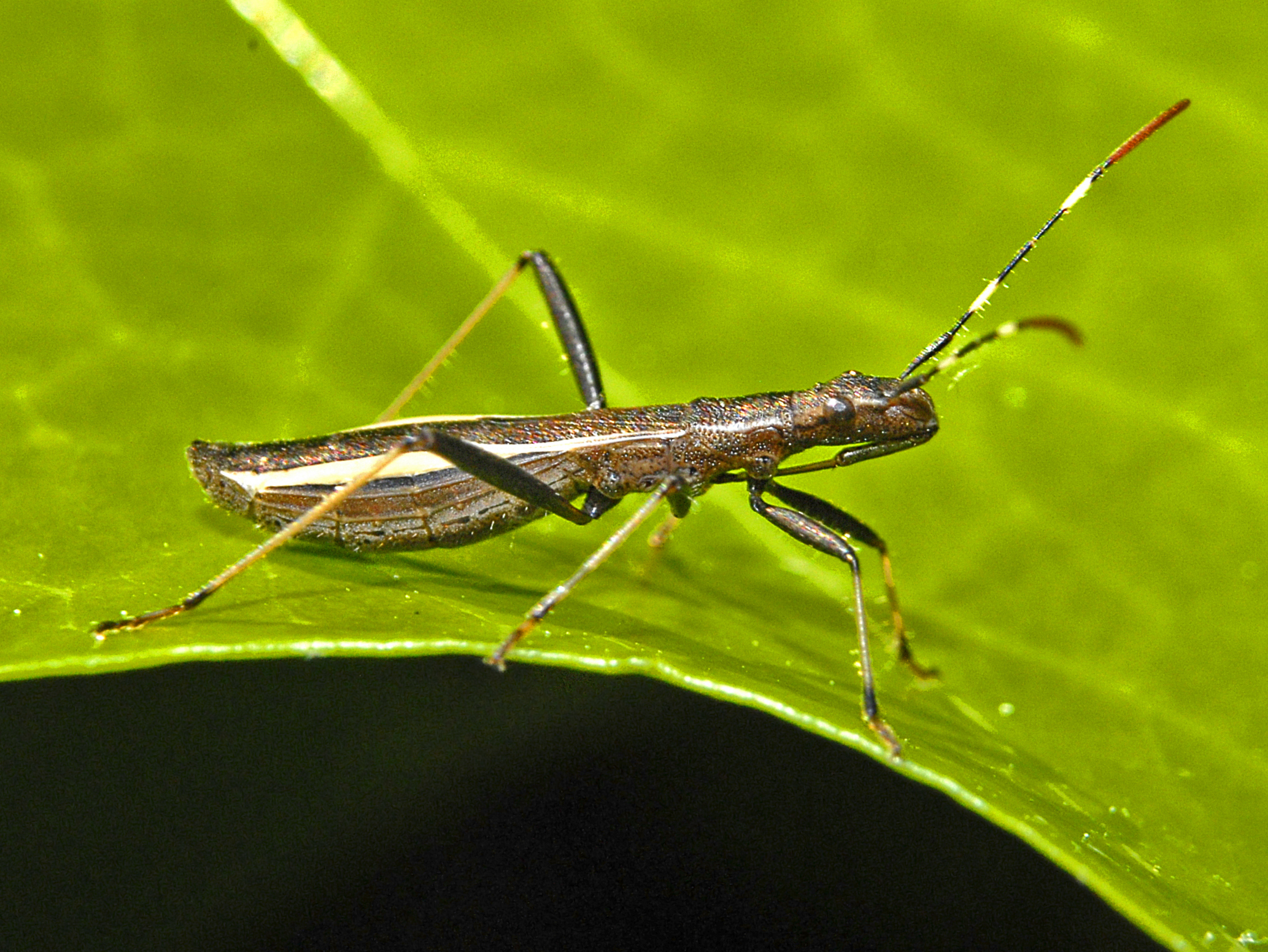
- Micrelytra fossularum

Scientific classification
- Kingdom: Animalia
- Phylum: Arthropoda
- Clade: Pancrustacea
- Class: Insecta
- Order: Hemiptera
- Suborder: Heteroptera
- Superfamily: Coreoidea
- Family: Alydidae
- Subfamily: Micrelytrinae; Stål, 1868

= Micrelytrinae =

Subfamily of true bugs

The Micrelytrinae are a subfamily of true bugs in the family Alydidae, based on the type genus Micrelytra Laporte, 1833. Genera are recorded from the Americas, Europe and Asia.

== Tribes and Genera ==
The Coreoidea Species File lists three tribes:

=== Leptocorisini ===
Auth.: Stål, 1872 (synonym Leptocorisaria Stål)

- Bloeteocoris Ahmad, 1965
- Grypocephalus Hsiao, 1963
- Leptocorisa Latreille, 1829
- Mutusca Stål, 1866
- Stenocoris Burmeister, 1839

=== Micrelytrini ===
Auth.: Stål, 1868

- Acestra Dallas, 1852
- Anacestra Hsiao, 1964
- Bactrocoris Kormilev, 1953
- Bactrodosoma Stål, 1860
- Bactrophya Breddin, 1901
- Bactrophyamixia Brailovsky, 1991
- Calamocoris Breddin, 1901
- Cydamus Stål, 1860
- Darmistus Stål, 1860
- Dulichius Stål, 1866
- Esperanza Barber, 1906
- Eudarmistus Breddin, 1903
- Longicoris Ahmad, 1968
- Marcius Stål, 1865
- Micrelytra Laporte, 1833 (monotypic type genus)
- Paramarcius Hsiao, 1964
- Paraplesius Scott, 1874
- Protenor Stål, 1868
- Slateria Ahmad, 1965
- Stachyolobus Stål, 1871
- Trachelium Herrich-Schäffer, 1850
- Tuberculiformia Ahmad, 1967

=== Noliphini ===
Auth.: Ahmad, 1965

- Cosmoleptus Stål, 1873
- Lyrnessus Stål, 1862
- Noliphus Stål, 1859
- †Orthriocorisa Scudder, 1890
