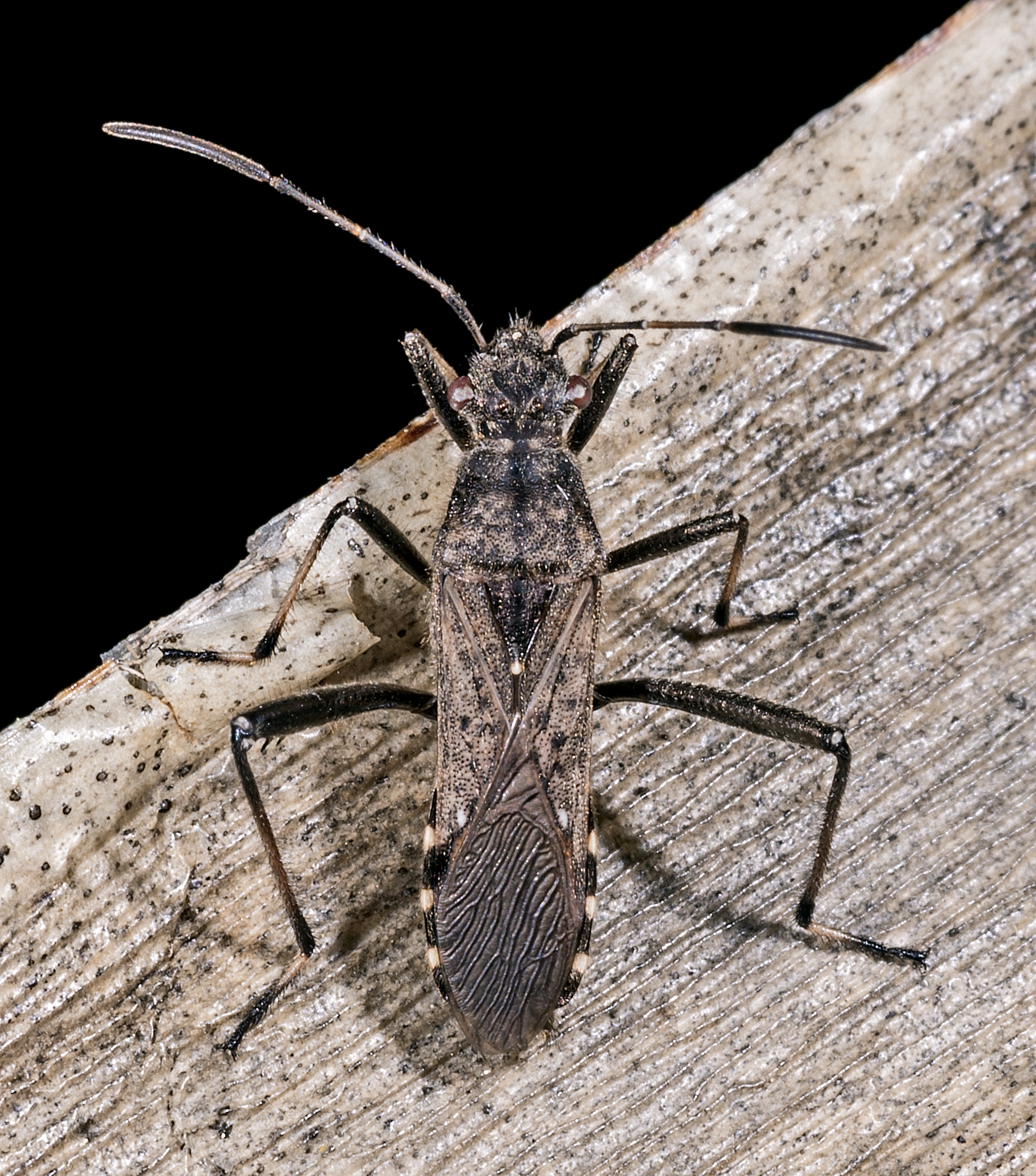
- Alydus calcaratus

Scientific classification
- Kingdom: Animalia
- Phylum: Arthropoda
- Clade: Pancrustacea
- Class: Insecta
- Order: Hemiptera
- Suborder: Heteroptera
- Superfamily: Coreoidea
- Family: Alydidae; Amyot & Serville, 1843

Subfamilies
- Alydinae; Micrelytrinae and see text

Synonyms
- Coriscidae Stichel, 1925

= Alydidae =

Family of true bugs

Alydidae, commonly known as broad-headed bugs, is a family of true bugs very similar to the closely related Coreidae (leaf-footed bugs and relatives). There are at least 60 genera and 300 species altogether. Distributed in the temperate and warmer regions of the Earth, most are tropical and subtropical animals; for example Europe has a mere 10 species, and only 2 of these occur outside the Mediterranean region.

== Names ==
Broad-headed bugs are known as knobe in the Meto and Funai Helong languages of West Timor, Indonesia.

== Description ==
Broad-headed bugs are up to 10–12 millimetres (0.4–0.5 in) long, and have slender bodies. Some have long and very thin legs. The most notable characteristics of the family are that the head is broad, often similar in length and width to the pronotum and the scutellum, and that the last antennal segments are elongated and curved. The compound eyes are globular and protruding, and they also have ocelli. The femora of the hindlegs bear several strong spines; the tarsus has three segments. Most species have well-developed hemelytra (forewings), allowing them to fly well, but in some the hemelytra are vestigial. The membranous part of the hemelytra have several closely spaced long veins.

Alydidae are generally of dusky or blackish coloration. The upperside of the abdomen is usually bright orange-red. this color patch is normally not visible as it is covered by the wings; it can be exposed, perhaps to warn would-be predators of these animals' noxiousness: They frequently have scent glands that produce a stink considered to be worse than that of true stink bugs (Pentatomidae). The stink is said to smell similar to a bad case of halitosis.

Sometimes the adults have reduced wings. Both, nymphs and adults of some species, such as Dulichius inflatus and Hyalymenus spp. are ant mimics and live in ant nests.

== Ecology ==
These bugs mainly inhabit fairly arid and sandy habitat, like seashores, heathland, steppe and savannas. Their main food is seeds, which they pierce with their proboscis to drink the nutritious fluids contained within. Some are economically significant pests, for example Leptocorisa oratoria on rice. The Alydinae are also a pest of the edamame bean crop in North America, creating dark spots on the beans from feeding.

== Systematics ==
Two major lineages are generally accepted as subfamilies; a third (the Leptocorisinae) is now placed as a tribe Leptocorisini of the Micrelytrinae.

== Genera ==
These 60 genera belong to the family Alydidae:

- Acestra Dallas, 1852
- Alydus Fabricius, 1803
- Anacestra Hsiao, 1964
- Apidaurus Stål, 1870
- Bactrocoris Kormilev, 1953
- Bactrodosoma Stål, 1860
- Bactrophya Breddin, 1901
- Bactrophyamixia Brailovsky, 1991
- Bloeteocoris Ahmad, 1965
- Burtinus Stål, 1859
- Calamocoris Breddin, 1901
- Camptopus Amyot & Serville, 1843
- Cosmoleptus Stål, 1873
- Cydamus Stål, 1860
- Daclera Signoret, 1863
- Darmistus Stål, 1859
- Dulichius Stål, 1866
- Esperanza Barber, 1906
- Eudarmistus Breddin, 1903
- Euthetus Dallas, 1852
- Grypocephalus Hsiao, 1963
- Hamedius Stål, 1860
- Heegeria Reuter, 1881
- Hyalymenus Amyot & Serville, 1843
- Hypselopus Burmeister, 1835
- Leptocorisa Latreille, 1829
- Longicoris Ahmad, 1968
- Lyrnessus Stål, 1862
- Marcius Stål, 1865
- Megalotomus Fieber, 1860
- Melanacanthus Stål, 1873
- Micrelytra Laporte, 1833
- Mirperus Stål, 1860
- Mutusca Stål, 1866
- Nariscus Stål, 1866
- Nemausus Stål, 1866
- Neomegalotomus Schaffner & Schaefer, 1998
- Noliphus Stål, 1859
- Oxycranum Bergroth, 1910
- Paramarcius Hsiao, 1964
- Paraplesius Scott, 1874
- Planusocoris
- Protenor Stål, 1867
- Rimadarmistus Bliven, 1956
- Riptortus Stål, 1860
- Robustocephalus Ahmad, Abbas, Shadab & Khan, 1979
- Slateria Ahmad, 1965
- Stachyocnemus Stål, 1870
- Stachyolobus Stål, 1871
- Stenocoris Burmeister, 1839 (rice bugs)
- Tenosius Stål, 1860
- Tollius Stål, 1870
- Trachelium Herrich-Schäffer, 1850
- Tuberculiformia Ahmad, 1967
- Tupalus Stål, 1860
- Zulubius Bergroth, 1894
- † Heeralydus Štys & Riha, 1975
- † Orthriocorisa Scudder, 1890
- † Sulcalydus Štys & Riha, 1975
- † Willershausenia Popov, 2007
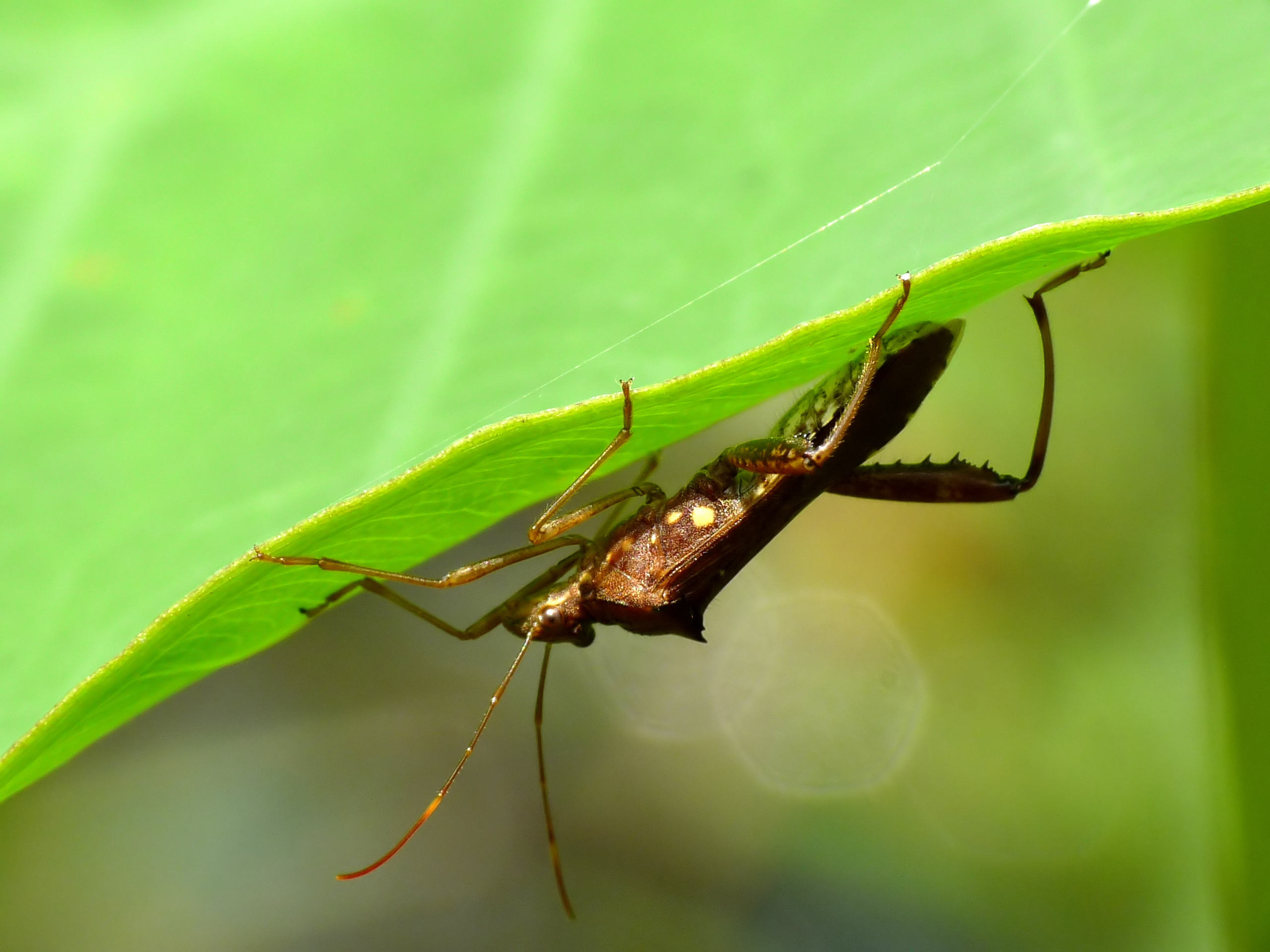
Riptortus sp. in Kerala

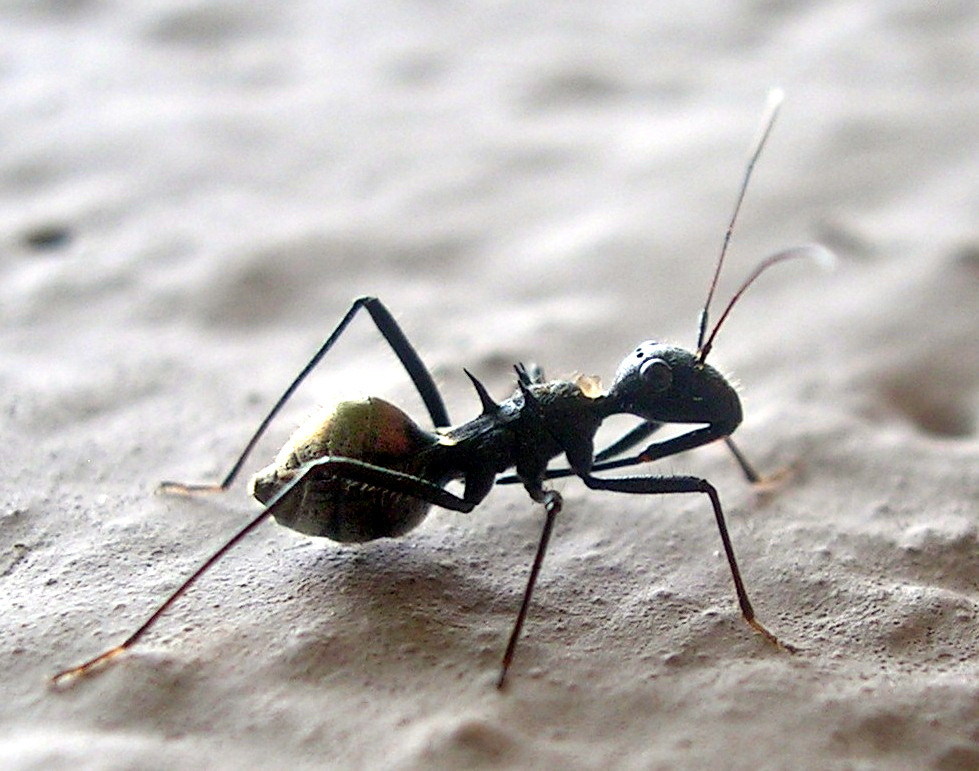
Dulichius inflatus, ant mimic
