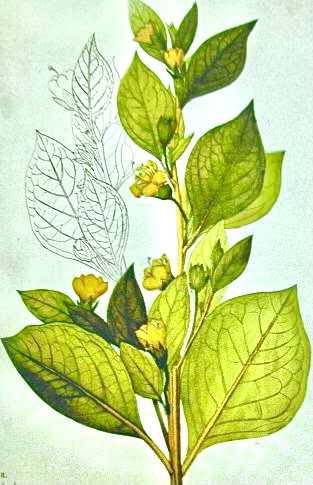

Scientific classification
- Kingdom: Plantae
- Clade: Tracheophytes
- Clade: Angiosperms
- Clade: Eudicots
- Clade: Asterids
- Order: Solanales
- Family: Solanaceae
- Genus: Atropa
- Species: A. baetica

Binomial name
- Atropa baetica Willk.
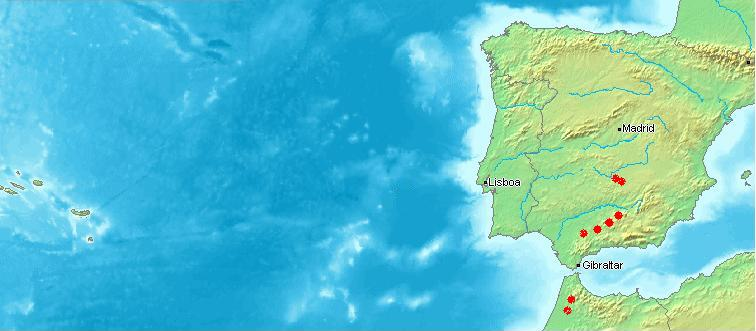
- Distribution

= Atropa baetica =

Species of flowering plant

Map of Roman province of Hispania, showing Hispania Baetica in the extreme Southeast

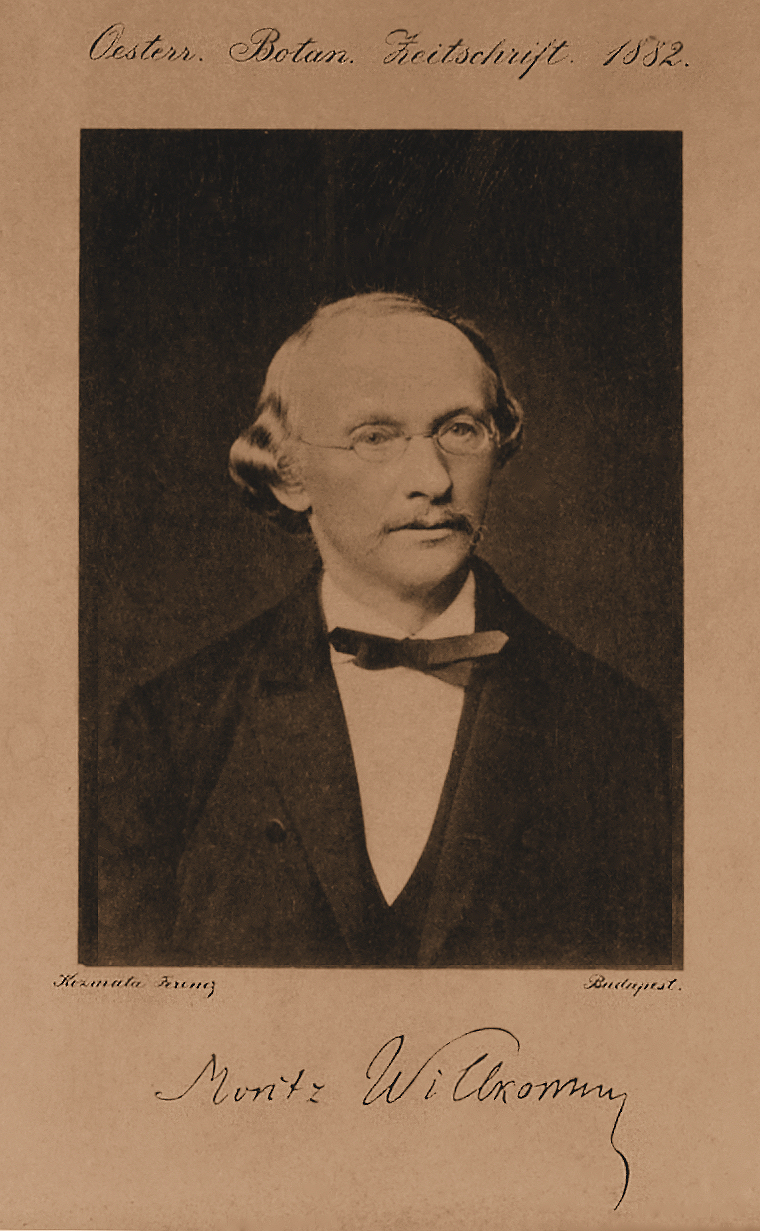
Heinrich Moritz Willkomm, specialist on the flora of the Iberian Peninsula and authority for the binomial name Atropa baetica

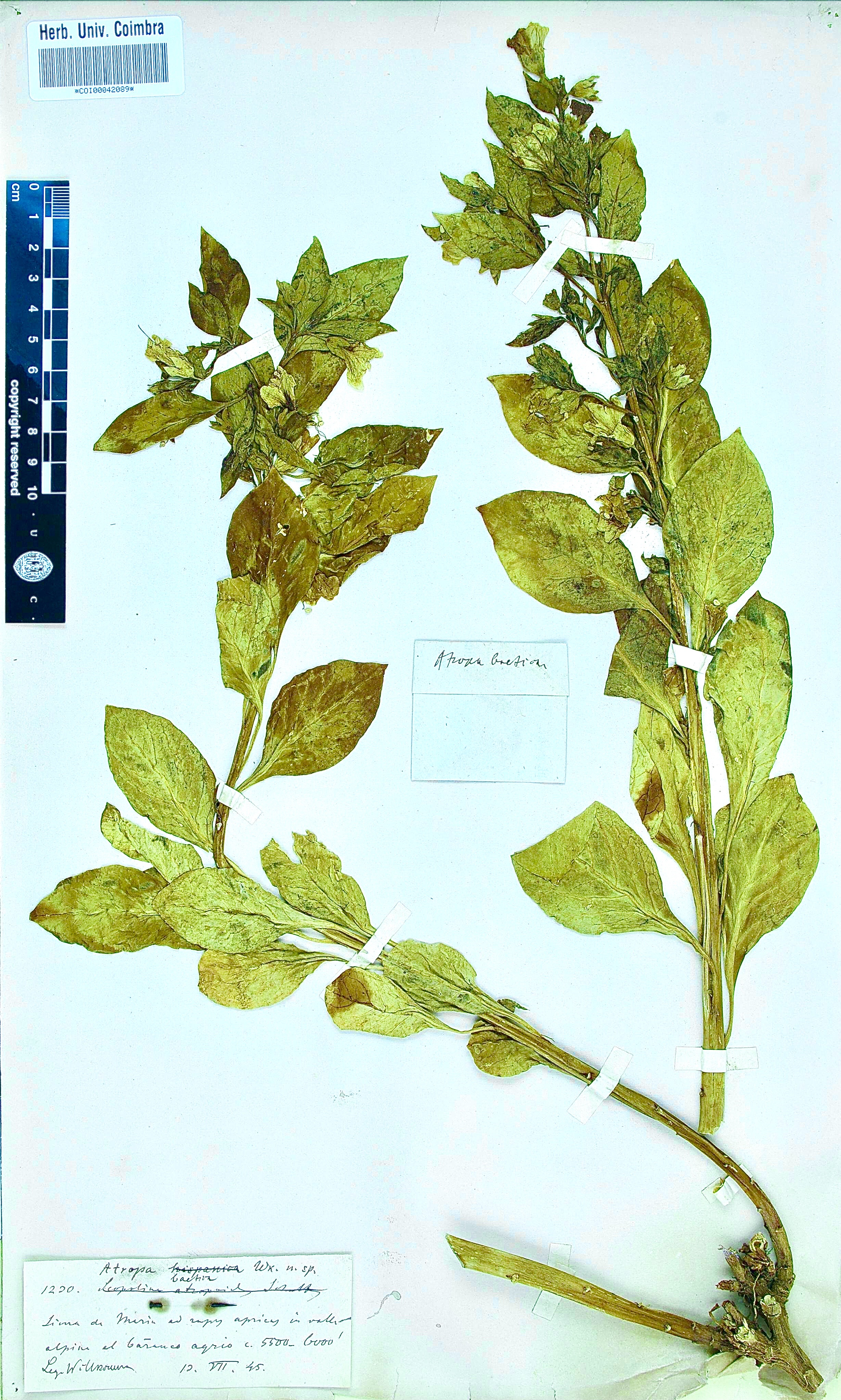
Lectotype (dated July 13,1845) of Atropa baetica held at Herbarium of the University of Coimbra, Portugal (COI). Image enhanced, revealing original colours of specimen in life

Atropa baetica, commonly known as the Andalusian belladonna, is one of Europe's rarest wildflowers. A close relative of the infamous deadly nightshade (Atropa belladonna), its specific name derives from that of the Roman province of Hispania Baetica, while its common name refers to the Spanish region of Andalucía – both designating the area in the south of Spain where it is most frequently encountered. It is an attractive perennial plant with a herbaceous habit, bearing infundibuliform (i.e. funnel-shaped), yellow or greenish flowers and shiny, black berries. Like the other three (generally accepted) species of Atropa, it is an extremely poisonous plant, containing a variety of tropane alkaloids with anticholinergic, deliriant, antispasmodic and mydriatic properties. Although most populations of the plant are to be found in Spain, it is not wholly confined to the Iberian Peninsula of Europe, occurring also in certain localities in Morocco (e.g. the Talassemtane National Park) and Algeria in the Atlas Mountains (Rif, Tell Atlas and Middle Atlas ranges) of North Africa. The Rif and the Baetic System, which face each other across the Alboran Sea (which includes the Strait of Gibraltar), together constitute one of the finest of the Mediterranean biodiversity hotspots – rich in endemic species, of which Atropa baetica is a notable example. (For more on Ibero-Maghrebi, floral biodiversity (featuring what, in Spanish are termed 'Iberoafricanismos') see Cartagena, Spain, section 'Environment' subsection 'Flora').

== Description ==
Atropa baetica Willk., Linnaea 25: 50 (1852) ...Hab. in Sierra de Maria in glareosis rupibusque umbrosis in valle nemorosa el Barrancon ad alt. circ 5000-5500 copiose, ubi d.13 Julii 1845 florentem legi...

Perennial herb (rhizomatous hemicryptophyte). Plant yellowish-green, glabrous; stems erect, fleshy, up to 125 cm in height, simple or branched above. Leaves alternate or opposite, simple, entire, lamina up to 13 × 7 cm, densely crowded, ovate, shortly acuminate, cuneate at base, mucronate, subcoriaceous and longipetiolate. Flowers solitary, axillary, borne in July. Pedicels erect. Calyx campanulate, 5-lobed, to 10 mm, lobes apiculate, somewhat accrescent. Corolla infundibuliform, up to 25 mm in diameter, twice as long as calyx, having lobes roughly equal in length to tube, green to yellow. Stamens subequal, inserted at base of corolla, exserted. Filaments tomentose at base. Anthers ovoid, pale yellow. Style long-exserted. Stigma peltate. Ovary with annular receptacular disc at base. Fruit a globose, shining, black berry, some 10mm in diameter. Rhizomatous root system relatively dense and shallow, penetrating to a depth of only 10–20 cm, but often spreading to form substantial clump. Habitat: light shade of upland forest on calcareous rocks and screes.

== Ploidy ==
Chromosome number of Atropa baetica and infraspecific taxa 2n=72

== Distribution ==
Atropa baetica is a calcicole species with a distribution centred upon the limestone mountains of the South and Southeast of the Iberian Peninsula and Northwest Africa. It has been found in the Spanish provinces of Cádiz (province), Province of Málaga, province of Granada, Province of Almería Province of Jaén (Spain), Province of Cuenca and Province of Guadalajara and, more recently, in those of Region of Murcia and Catalonia. It is also found in the Moroccan region of Tanger-Tetouan-Al Hoceima and in northern Algeria.

== Hybrids ==
Atropa baetica x A. belladonna – A. x martiana Font Quer published in Cavallinesia 5: 156 (1932)

In areas of Spain where A. baetica and A. belladonna grow together (either naturally as in the province of Jaén, or through the agency of humans, as in Cuenca and Madrid) populations of Atropa exist, the members of which are hard to assign to one species or the other, showing as they do features intermediate between the two. A x martiana was described from a plant found growing in the Botanic Garden of the Museum of Natural Sciences of Barcelona (now known as the Historic Botanic Garden of Barcelona): a natural/spontaneous hybrid between a plant of A. belladonna grown from seed collected in the Serra de la Mussara in the Province of Tarragona and a plant of A. baetica derived from seed from the Sierra de las Nieves in Malaga. Eminent, Catalan scientist Professor Pius Font i Quer (1888–1964), who first described the hybrid, was also the founder of the botanic garden in which he noted that the cross had occurred.

Although native in the Serrania de Cuenca, Atropa baetica has also been aided in the distribution of its seed there by human activity: in 1936, local gatherers of medicinal plants gathered ripe berries from plants in the area and sowed the seed in various localities in the Serrania in an attempt to replace the plants that they were harvesting and thus ensure the feasibility of future harvests of mature plants.

== Comparison with Atropa bella-donna ==
Atropa baetica is most easily distinguished from A. bella-donna when the plants are in flower and fruit: not only are the open, cup-like, yellow corollas of the former more ornamental than the sombre, purple bells of the latter, but they also offer a more pleasing contrast with the glossy black berries (- if its luscious-looking fruits did not pose such a threat to children, A. baetica might make an attractive garden plant for the herbaceous border). The berries of A. baetica are slightly smaller than those of A. bella-donna and contain fewer seeds, although the seeds themselves are larger than those of A. bella-donna. When not in flower or fruit, differentiation is less easy, but may be achieved by attention to leaf colour and relative pubescence: A. baetica has yellowish-green foliage and the plant is relatively glabrous, while A. belladonna is a somewhat pubescent plant with dark green foliage. Furthermore, A. baetica is a somewhat smaller plant, rarely exceeding 125 cm in height, while A. bella-donna often reaches 150 cm with occasional very robust specimens reaching 200 cm.

== Habitat ==
Atropa baetica grows among the undergrowth of mixed, upland forest on dry, sunny, rocky or stony slopes (and also, occasionally, in moister, shadier areas near watercourses) in limy (Calcium-rich) soils (often in disturbed, nitrogen-rich locations – see Nitrification and Human impact on the nitrogen cycle) at altitudes of 900–2,000 m. It is not, however, a quick coloniser of recently disturbed areas, preferring instead locations which have been disturbed at some time in the past e.g. the margins of disused or seldom-used paths, bridle paths and trackways (see ridgeway (road) and Drover's road) and also forest clearings, often in rather remote areas. A. baetica is frequently found growing in woodland of which the conifers Pinus nigra subsp. salzmanii var. salzmanii, Abies pinsapo and Juniperus communis form major components. Other frequent companion plants include the hawthorn Crataegus monogyna, the shrubs Buxus sempervirens, Viburnum tinus, Genista scorpius and Daphne laureola – and the tussock (grass) Brachypodium phoenicoides.

== Phenology ==
Atropa baetica has a short growing season (around 5 months), favouring sites subjected to heavy winter precipitation in the form of snowfall and a hot summer/early autumn. The green shoots begin to sprout at ground level in mid-May. Growth (initially very rapid – stems reaching their full height in a mere 3–4 weeks) continues until early August, involving also residual summer growth of small leaf-rosettes (associated with the spread of the clump of rhizomes) which persist near ground level without giving rise to flowering stems. Anthesis (flowering) can occur from as early as the third week in June until mid-August, the greatest number of open flowers being present during the first fortnight of July. Unripe berries may be seen from late June up until the third week of September. Ripe berries are present from the beginning of September to mid-October, nearly all being ripe by the end of September.Senescence is observable between early/mid-September and late October: the first signs of foliar senescence have become noticeable by mid-September and by mid-October practically all plants are reduced to stands of leafless stems, the non -flowering basal rosettes being the last to lose their leaves. The last vestiges of aerial growth disappear shortly after the first rains or heavy falls of snow.

== Pollinators ==
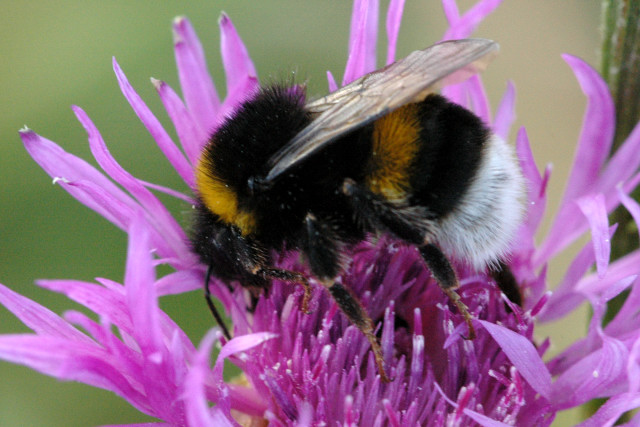
Bombus lucorum

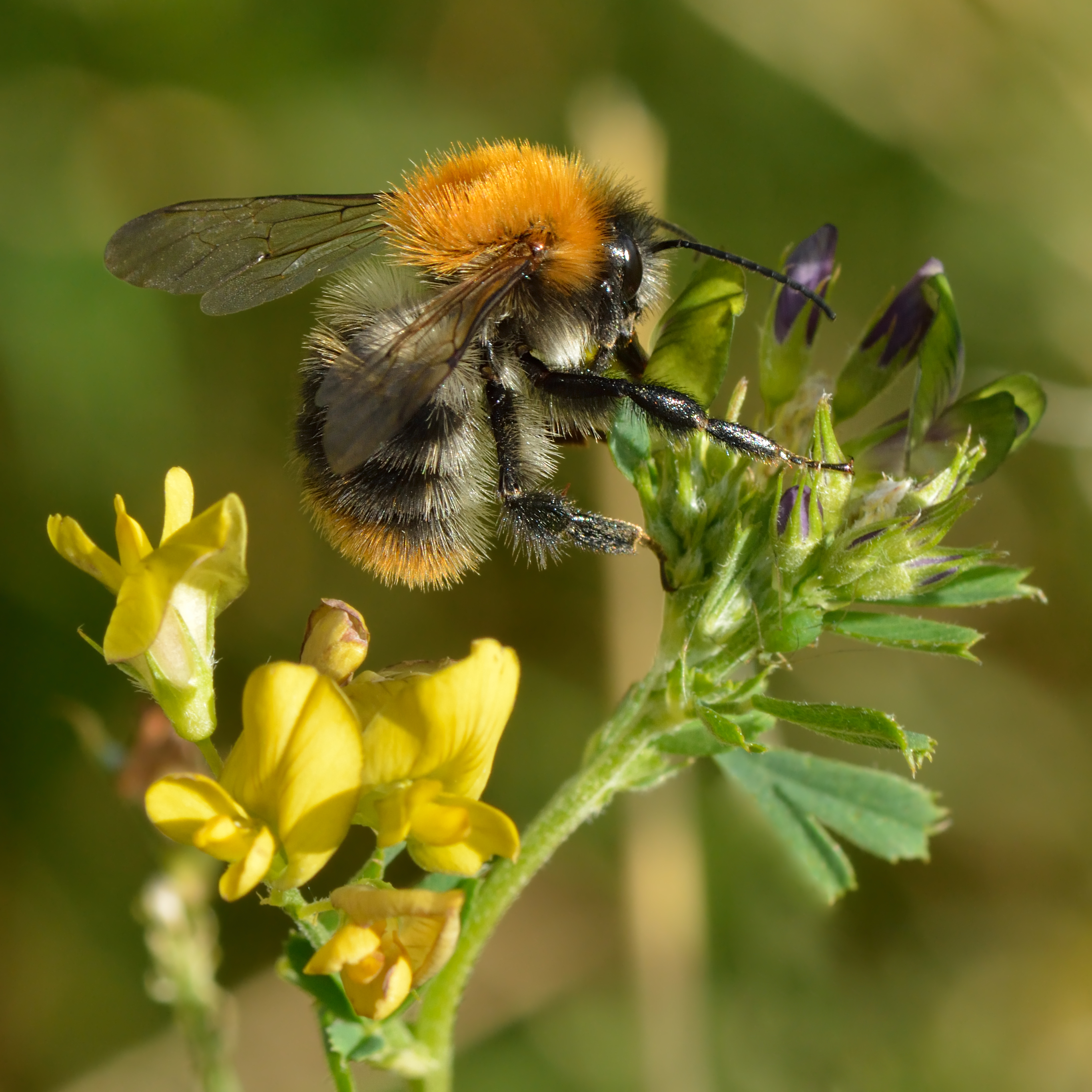
Bombus pascuorum

The three insects observed to visit the flowers of Atropa baetica most regularly are the bumblebees Bombus lucorum L. and Bombus pascuorum Scop. and the European honeybee Apis mellifera – all members of the bee family Apidae.

Other pollinators include, in bee family Megachilidae: Anthidium septemdentatum Latr., Megachile octosignata Nyl. and Megachile lagopoda L.;

in bee family Anthophoridae: Anthophora albigena Lepeletier, and various Ceratina species;

in bee family Halictidae: Halictus scabiosae Rossi and Lasioglossum albocinctum Luc.;

and the ant species Lasius niger L. In subfamily Formicinae of the Formicidae.

== Insect consumers ==
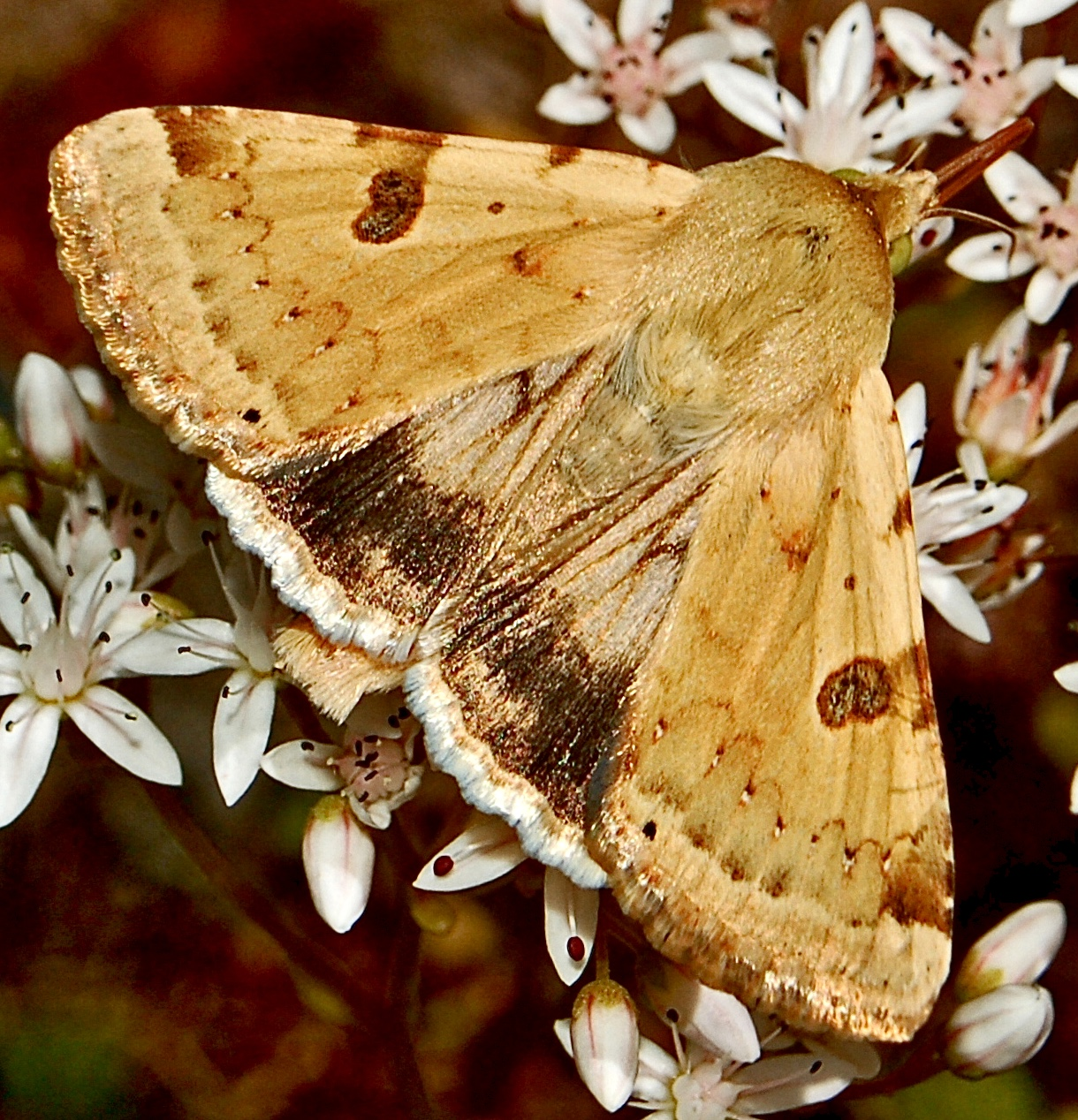
Heliothis peltigera, the Bordered Straw moth

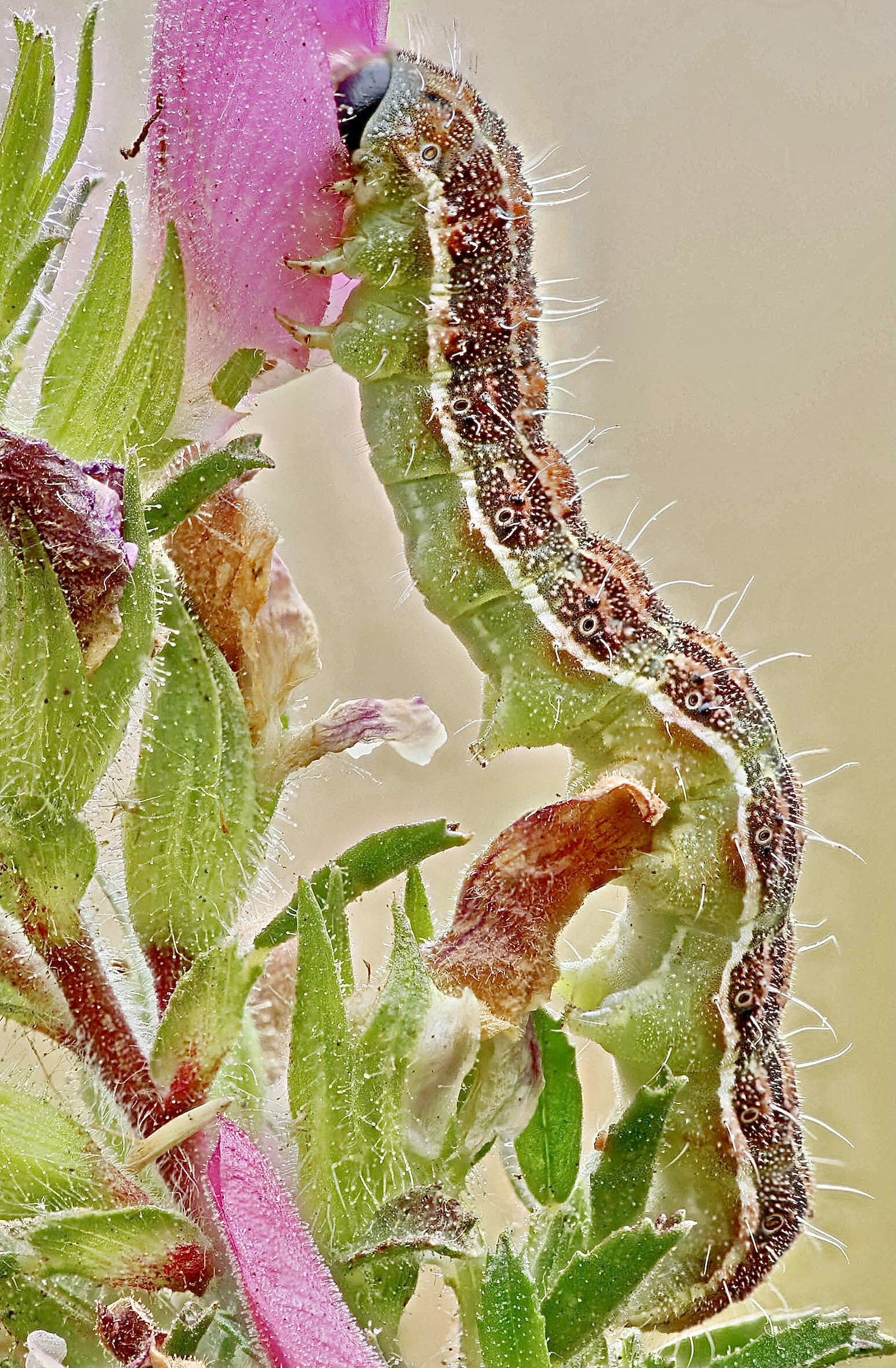
Heliothis peltigera larva

Atropa baetica is one of the food plants of the larva of the Noctuid moth Heliothis peltigera Schiff. However, the toxicity of the leaves before the onset of senescence is such that the moth imagoes can display developmental abnormalities resulting from larval consumption of the plant e.g. deformities of the wings. The common name of H. peltigera in German (Bilsenkraut-Blüteneule) translates as 'the henbane-blossom owl (moth)', revealing the species' penchant for another plant in the Hyoscyameae – namely Hyoscyamus niger, black henbane – the chemistry of which is similar to that of Atropa baetica.

Several species of Hemiptera have been observed to feed on the juice of the fruits – both ripe and unripe: Spilostethus pandurus Scop. in family Lygaeidae and Carpocoris mediterraneus Tamanini in family Pentatomidae suck the sap of developing fruits in August–September, while (more rarely) Corizus hyoscyami L. of the Rhopalidae and Palomena prasina L. of the Pentatomidae have been known to suck the juice of the ripe berries in September–October. Very occasionally, Camptopus lateralis Germar. of the Alydidae has been seen to feed on the sap of the leaves.

The flea beetle Epitrix atropae (family Chrysomelidae, tribe Alticini) received its specific name in reference to its feeding upon Atropa species – chewing a multitude of tiny holes in the leaves.

== Avian consumers ==
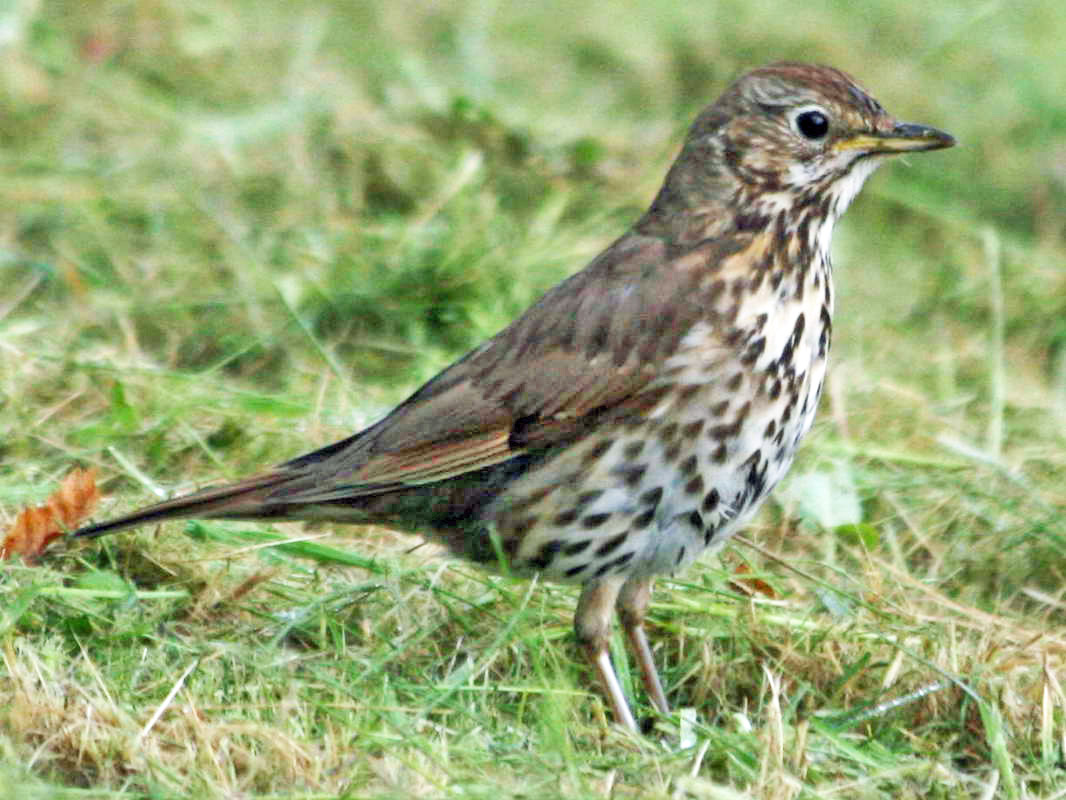
Turdus philomelos, the Song thrush, likely a consumer of the berries of A. baetica and thus a seed dispersal vector through endozoochory

Like many other plants bearing juicy, sugar-rich berries full of small seeds,(including other species of Atropa) A. baetica is dependent on various species of birds as seed-dispersal vectors. Birds transport the berries they have eaten far from the parent plant and the acids and enzymes present in the avian gut serve to break down the seed coat and speed the rate of germination in seeds passed in droppings. The droppings themselves, being rich in Nitrogen, furnish fertiliser to feed the seedlings, once germination has occurred. The extreme similarity of the berries of A. baetica to those of A. belladonna permit the conclusion that the bird species involved in the distribution of the seeds of the two species are almost certainly the same; although (unfortunately) it is rarely possible to observe birds consuming the fruit (of the rarer species) due to the severe damage to A. baetica caused by ungulates at fruiting time (see below). This conclusion allowed, it may be noted that one of the avian seed vectors for A. belladonna is Turdus philomelos, the song thrush and it is likely that other members of the family Turdidae found in Spain (of which there are a further nine – see section Passeriformes in List of birds of Spain) are involved too. In this connection it is worth mentioning that there is a small, but nonetheless intriguing, piece of evidence, in a Plautine comedy, that the Roman province of Hispania Baetica may have been famed as a supplier of thrushes, as food, to the tables of Ancient Rome. If this was indeed the case, such intensive bird-trapping could not fail to have had some impact on a plant dependent largely upon thrushes for its propagation by seed. The Tartessian (see Tartessos) tribe the Turdetani (thrush people?) of the valley of the Guadalquivir may have been known as such to the Romans by virtue of their trade in these edible songbirds. The berries of Atropa belladonna have also been reported to be consumed, without harm, by the common pheasant, Phasianus colchicus (an introduced species in Spain) – which is therefore, like the song thrush, likely also to be a consumer of the berries of Atropa baetica. In addition to the common pheasant, there are six other bird species (partridges in the main) placed in the phasianidae found in Spain (of which four are native and two introduced) which are probable consumers/seed vectors of Atropa species. Like the phasianidae, the domestic chicken is also a member of the order Galliformes and will feed on Atropa berries if presented with them (- see below in section Medicinal Uses).

== Mammalian consumers ==
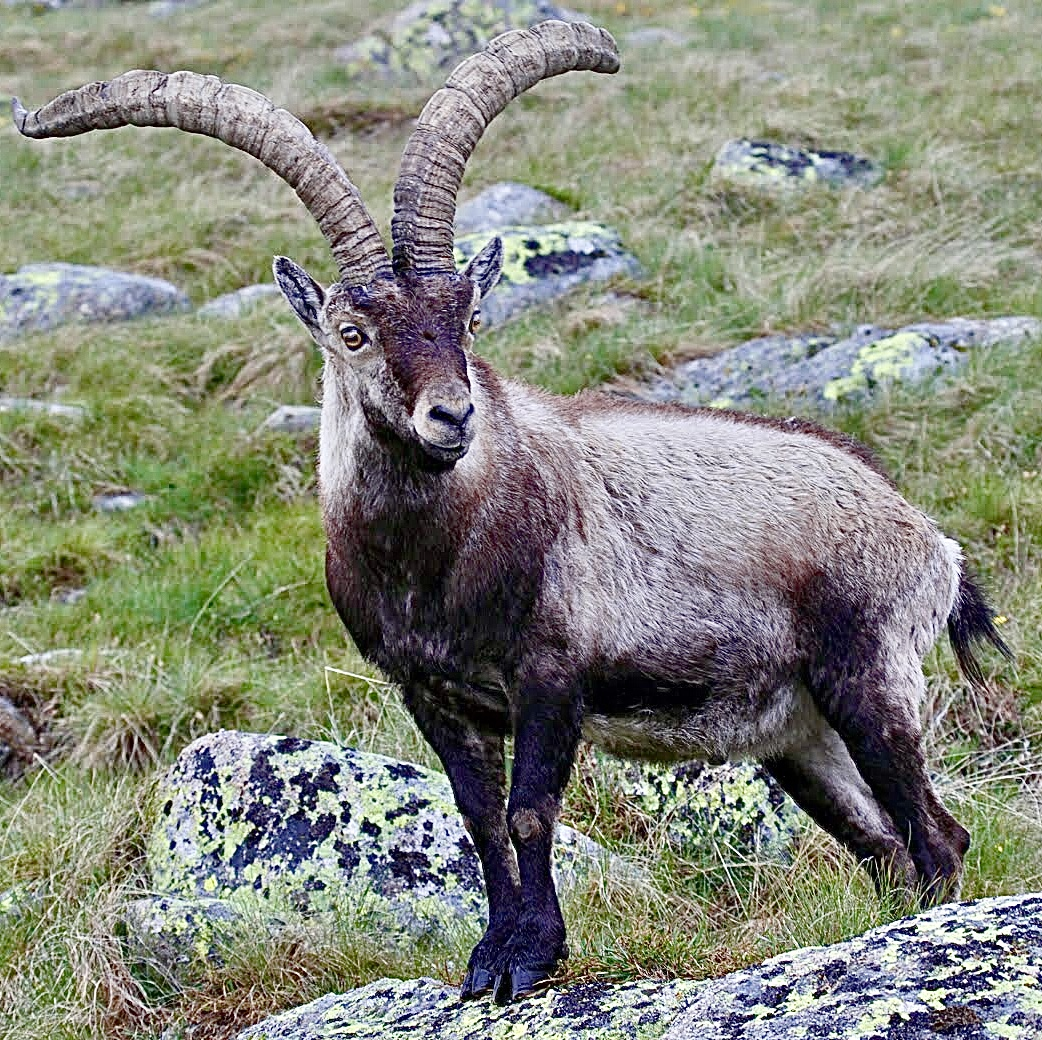
Iberian ibex (male) Capra pyrenaica ssp. hispanica

Neither vertebrates nor invertebrates consume A. baetica during the earlier stages of its growth cycle; however, during the month of September, when the onset of senescence causes the levels of tropanes in the aerial parts of the plant to fall, it often sustains severe damage from being browsed by the Southeastern Spanish ibex Capra pyrenaica Schinz. ssp. hispanica Schimper. Plants are stripped almost bare of leaves, fruit (both ripe and unripe) and even stem tips. Plants damaged in this way respond by producing small rosettes of leaves – either at ground level or upon the lower third of the flowering stem – which tend to sustain no further browsing damage before winter dormancy, possibly because of alkaloid levels raised as a defense mechanism activated by the check to growth. Needless to say, the effect of such browsing upon the sexual reproduction of A. baetica is profound: fewer ripe berries – and therefore fewer viable seeds – survive such wholesale destruction and the plants themselves are weakened and effectively undergo a prematurely enforced dormancy. The ibexes do not appear to suffer any ill effects from consuming a plant so rich in toxic alkaloids, which fact (even allowing for the decrease in the plant's toxicity in the month of September) highlights the widely varying susceptibility of different vertebrate species to the poisons involved. (Compare cases of human poisoning by the closely related Atropa belladonna – in which as few as two ripe berries have led to the death of a child. There has been no research to date into the role of the Spanish ibex as a dispersal vector (through its droppings) of Atropa baetica seed.

Considerable damage, through browsing, is also inflicted on the plant in the Sierra de la Cazorla during the time of its flowering and fruiting by two non-native/introduced ungulate species, namely Ovis orientalis ssp. musimon, the mouflon and Dama dama, the fallow deer.

An online account of a recent botanical foray in search of Atropa baetica populations in Spain and Morocco mentions a plant of the species which the author maintains to have been severely damaged by either feral pigs or Sus scrofa ssp. meridionalis, the Mediterranean wild boar. Dr. Herrera, however, notes (in his excellent study of A. baetica in the Sierra de Cazorla) that on no occasion did he see evidence that wild boars had been digging up the rhizomes of the plant in order to feed on them – the rarity of which behaviour he attributes to the boars' rejection of such potentially nutritious, starchy perennating organs (see perennation), on account of an awareness of their toxicity. In this context it is instructive to consider that wild boars are able to consume, without harm, a variety of plant genera which are toxic (in some cases extremely so) to humans – most notably Aconitum, a genus yielding some of the most virulently poisonous alkaloids in the plant kingdom. If wild boars do indeed eat the rhizomes of Atropa baetica on occasion, it is at least possible that they do so for reasons other than simple hunger. There is anecdotal evidence that certain Suidae deliberately consume at least one alkaloidal, plant hallucinogen, becoming highly intoxicated as a result. Indigenous groups in Gabon claim that they first learned of the psychoactive properties of Tabernanthe iboga (now utilised in the Bwiti religion) by observing wild pigs grubbing up the roots of the shrub, eating them and subsequently exhibiting symptoms of wild excitement.

== Medicinal uses ==
Like its better-known relative Atropa belladonna, A. baetica is a medicinal plant that has, in the past, been gathered in the wild as a source of valuable tropane alkaloids – most notably Atropine and Scopolamine (=Hyoscine). The harvesting of the roots and rhizomes has involved the destruction of mature plants, further endangering a species likely never to have been common to start with and now extremely rare. As a result, the plant can now no longer be found in certain localities in which it used to grow e.g. its type locality (biology): the wooded valley of Barrancon in the Sierra de Maria-Los Velez Natural Park, Province of Almeria In addition to its former use in modern medicine as a source of alkaloidal drugs (discontinued, due to conservation concerns over the rarity of the species), Atropa baetica has interesting uses in the traditional medicine of Morocco.

One of the Moroccan Arabic names for both Atropa baetica and A. belladonna is ḥabb el-fahm meaning 'seed of intelligence/understanding'. One author maintains this to be due to a confusion (due to a similarity between certain Moroccan names of the plants in question) with Anacardium occidentale L., but this is belied by an ethnobotanical note on A. baetica by the estimable Prof. Font i Quer, who recorded a practice whereby a chicken was fed with Atropa berries until its flesh was judged to be sufficiently saturated with the plant's poisons (or metabolites thereof?) The chicken was then killed and its meat eaten by a person seeking (as the first author has it) to 'sharpen the faculties of the mind'. For some days the eater of the drugged chicken would show signs of belladonna poisoning, but, when they recovered from this intoxication, would find their faculty of memory greatly enhanced in clarity and retentiveness – an effect often sought as an aid to the memorising of passages from the Quran and to cramming (education) for examinations. The same practice (along with another, undertaken for the same purpose, involving drinking the milk of a goat fed on Atropa berries) has been recorded more recently with regard to Atropa belladonna. (Additional evidence that birds can indeed accumulate tropanes in their muscle tissue as a result of consuming a Solanaceous plant is provided by certain waterfowl in Mexico: the ducks of the Huizache lagoon of Mazatlan have been found to be intoxicating, when eaten, as a result of their habitual consumption of the tropane-containing Datura ceratocaula. As to the curious (positive) pharmacological rebound effect of recovery from a tropane-induced delirium leading to an enhancement of mental capacity, there is an instructive parallel in the folk medicine of Bulgaria, in which people with senile dementia are said to recover their lost faculties to a surprising degree after recovering from being subjected to just such a delirium through the use of Atropa belladonna).

Another use of Atropa baetica in the folk medicine of Morocco is as one of the constituent plants in a polyherbal, abortifacient preparation. This is employed by local Traditional birth attendants in the Rif and takes the form of an orally administered decoction of the following plant species (all of which are considered locally to be toxic and/or narcotic): Cannabis sativa, Atropa baetica, Nerium oleander, Ruta montana, Agave americana, and Drimia maritima. The decoction, drunk on an empty stomach, is reported to be effective in the termination of pregnancy at a stage of 2–3 months. The traditional medical practitioners who employ such herbal abortifacients stress that they are dangerous and have caused numerous fatalities. Agave americana is undoubtedly the least toxic of the plant ingredients, although it sometimes causes the condition Purpuric agave dermatitis and could thus be acknowledged to possess some irritant properties. Of the remaining ingredients, Ruta species cause photosensitivity and can be abortifacient in their own right, Nerium and Drimia (syn. Urginea) contain dangerous cardiac glycosides, Cannabis is a well-known and relatively non-toxic hallucinogen and Atropa, while also a hallucinogen, is better known as a poison. Even without taking into account complex drug interactions, such a 'cocktail' of dangerous plants could indeed prove fatal, not only to a fetus but also to the pregnant woman carrying it.

== Chemistry ==
No fewer than 15 tropane alkaloids have been isolated from Atropa baetica, of which the most abundant are atropine and scopolamine – alkaloids of frequent occurrence in toxic Solanaceous plants (notably in tribes Hyoscyameae and Datureae)) with a history of employment as analgesics, anaesthetics and hallucinogens in traditional medicine.

== Nomenclature ==
The authority for the binomial name Atropa baetica is the eminent German botanist and pioneering plant-hunter in Spain Heinrich Moritz Willkomm (1821–1895), who published it in 1852 in the German (language) Linnaea (journal)(Berlin, 1826–1882) (see also Polish Wikipedia page Linnaea (czasopismo) ).

The common name 'belladonna de Andalucia' (Andalusian belladonna) is a botanical/horticultural coinage, being essentially a translation of the Latin binomial, placing the plant in relation to its notorious sister species, A. belladonna (a much commoner and far more widespread species, found in nearly all of Europe). By contrast, the most widely used common name for Atropa baetica in Spanish – tabaco gordo i.e. 'stout/big tobacco' – places the plant in relation, not to the one other species of Atropa found in Spain, but to plants belonging to a different genus of the family Solanaceae – namely Nicotiana. This is also true of most, if not all, of the other common names recorded for A. baetica in Spain of which the following are listed: tabaco de pastor ('shepherd's tobacco'), tabaco Filipino ('Filipino tobacco') tabaco verde ('green tobacco') and tabaco borde ('wayside tobacco'). These tobacco-related names imply that A. baetica has, on occasion, been smoked like tobacco in Spain and that there has been a popular awareness there of a family resemblance (particularly in relation to foliage) between Atropa and Nicotiana. In this context, it is worth noting that, while the flower of the widely cultivated Nicotiana tabacum is of a pale pink to violet colour, that of the less frequently cultivated but much more potent Nicotiana rustica, is yellow – like that of Atropa baetica.

== Smoked as recreational drug ==
While the smoking of cigarettes containing the dried leaves of Atropa species for the purpose of relieving asthma symptoms is well documented in the history of modern medicine, the practice of smoking Atropa leaves as a recreational drug in the period predating the upsurge of interest in such drugs among the Beat Generation of the 1950s and in the hippie subculture of the 1960s is neither well-known nor well-researched. That the tobacco-related common names for Atropa baetica in Spanish cited above demonstrate that the plant really has been smoked as a tobacco substitute in Spain is confirmed by an ethnobotanical observation made by Prof. Font i Quer, who states that A. baetica is smoked by the shepherds of la Sagra. (The geographical designation la Sagra generally refers in Spain to a part of the Submeseta Sur (a part, in turn of the Meseta central), although it is possible (given the distribution of A. baetica ) that the Sierra de la Sagra (a mountain range further to the South of the Submeseta) may be intended). Font i Quer goes on to compare this smoking of A. baetica with the occasional smoking of A. belladonna in the Catalan (i.e. Eastern) part of the Pyrenees (where one of A. belladonna 's common names, in the Catalan language is tabac bord – compare name tabaco borde for A. baetica in Spanish). In neither instance, however, does he enlarge upon his observations, making no mention of the time of year at which the leaves were gathered, whether they were cured like tobacco or merely dried, how much of the leaf material was smoked at one time etc. – all of which would affect the amount of tropanes absorbed by these smokers of Atropa leaves and thus the degree of their intoxication.

Atropa baetica is also smoked as a recreational drug in the Rif of Morocco, where – under the name of tabba – it occasionally forms one of the constituents of the cannabis-based preparation kief, smoked in the traditional Sebsi – a small-bowled pipe fitted with a mesh screen.

That Atropa species should ever have become popular as recreational drugs is surprising, to say nothing of a testament to human curiosity and foolhardiness. It can hardly be overstressed that Atropa baetica is an extremely poisonous plant and that the altered state of consciousness produced by its use is better characterised as a delirium or substance-induced psychosis than as the more lucid and contemplative state evoked by true hallucinogens such as LSD, psilocybin, mescaline et al. The following colourful mnemonic lists the main features of the anticholinergic syndrome produced by intoxication by tropane-containing Solanaceous plants such as A. baetica:

- Blind as a bat (dilated pupils)
- Red as a beet (vasodilation/flushing)
- Hot as a hare (hyperthermia)
- Dry as a bone (dry skin)
- Mad as a hatter (hallucinations/agitation)
- Bloated as a Toad (ileus, urinary retention)
- And the heart runs alone (tachycardia).

Visions caused by anticholinergics (including Atropa alkaloids) are often characterised by the following: warping or waving of surfaces and edges (distorted perception of objects actually present); flashes of 'light', 'smoke', visual snow, textured surfaces and insect or spider-like forms likely deriving from entoptic phenomena and form constants; and vivid hallucinations (indistinguishable from reality) of lifelike objects, animals and persons not actually present. The state is further characterised by confusion, fear, outbursts of rage, plucking or grabbing movements of the hands, sexual arousal and often also amnesia concerning parts of the experience. Blurred vision from cycloplegia and concomitant photophobia often persist for some days afterward. Long term use of anticholinergic drugs (including the alkaloids present in Atropa) is associated with physical and mental deterioration leading to dementia and premature death.

Studies of the use of Atropa as a hallucinogen in Europe have generally focused on its role as a frequently listed ingredient (often under such obsolete names as Solanum lethale and Solanum somniferum) in recipes for the witches' flying ointment dating from the late medieval to the early modern period – as described, for example, in the Magia Naturalis of Renaissance scholar and scientist Giambattista della Porta. By contrast, the smoking of Atropa leaves (for purposes other than the relieving of asthma symptoms) does not seem to have been recorded outside the Ibero-Maghrebi area. What the transdermal absorption route involved in the use of 'flying ointments' and the pulmonary absorption route through smoking have in common is that both techniques allow users a modicum of control over the intoxication that would be more problematic in oral use (ingestion of Atropa is recorded mainly in cases of poisoning – by the fatally edible-looking berries – rather than in accounts of hallucinogenic use).

The smoking, as hallucinogens, of genera of tropane-containing Solanaceae other than Atropa – alone or as additives to Cannabis preparations – is not unknown elsewhere and is, in some instances, a practice of considerable antiquity. Charred seeds of Hyoscyamus niger have been found at certain prehistoric sites, leaves of Hyoscyamus muticus have been smoked by certain Bedouin tribes and the leaves of Datura metel have been smoked with cannabis in India. By contrast – judging from the prevalence of tobacco-related names for Atropa baetica in Spain – the smoking of the plant may not date from earlier than the introduction of tobacco to Spain in the sixteenth century. However, given a) the Iberian peninsula's history of Islamic cultural influence under Arab rule b) Islam's tolerance of the practice of cannabis-smoking and c) the greater antiquity of cannabis-smoking than the smoking of tobacco, it is possible that Atropa baetica was smoked with cannabis (as it still is in Morocco) in Spain prior to the introduction of tobacco from Hispaniola.
