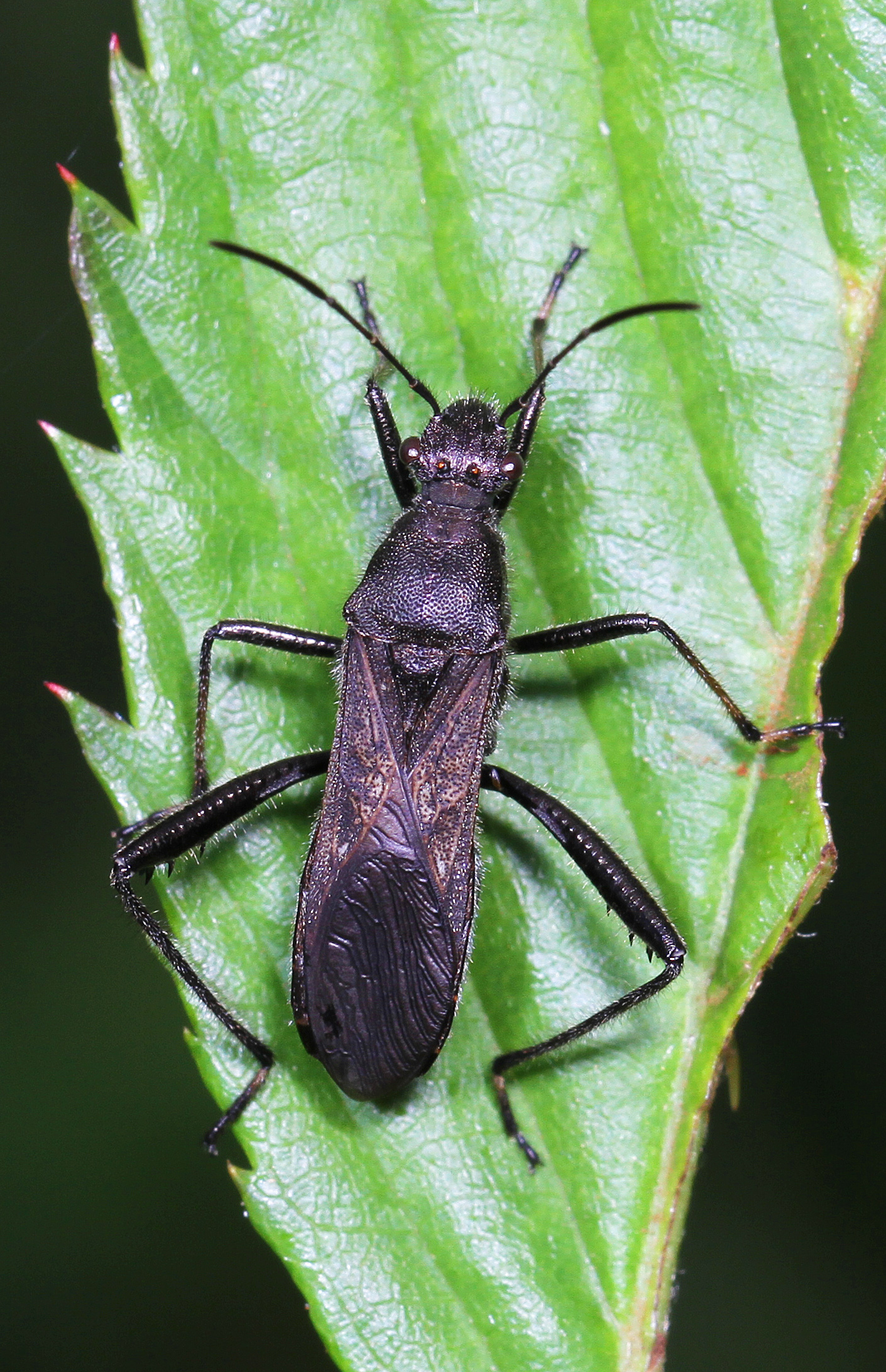

Scientific classification
- Kingdom: Animalia
- Phylum: Arthropoda
- Class: Insecta
- Order: Hemiptera
- Suborder: Heteroptera
- Family: Alydidae
- Genus: Alydus
- Species: A. eurinus

Binomial name
- Alydus eurinus (Say, 1825)

= Alydus eurinus =

Species of true bug

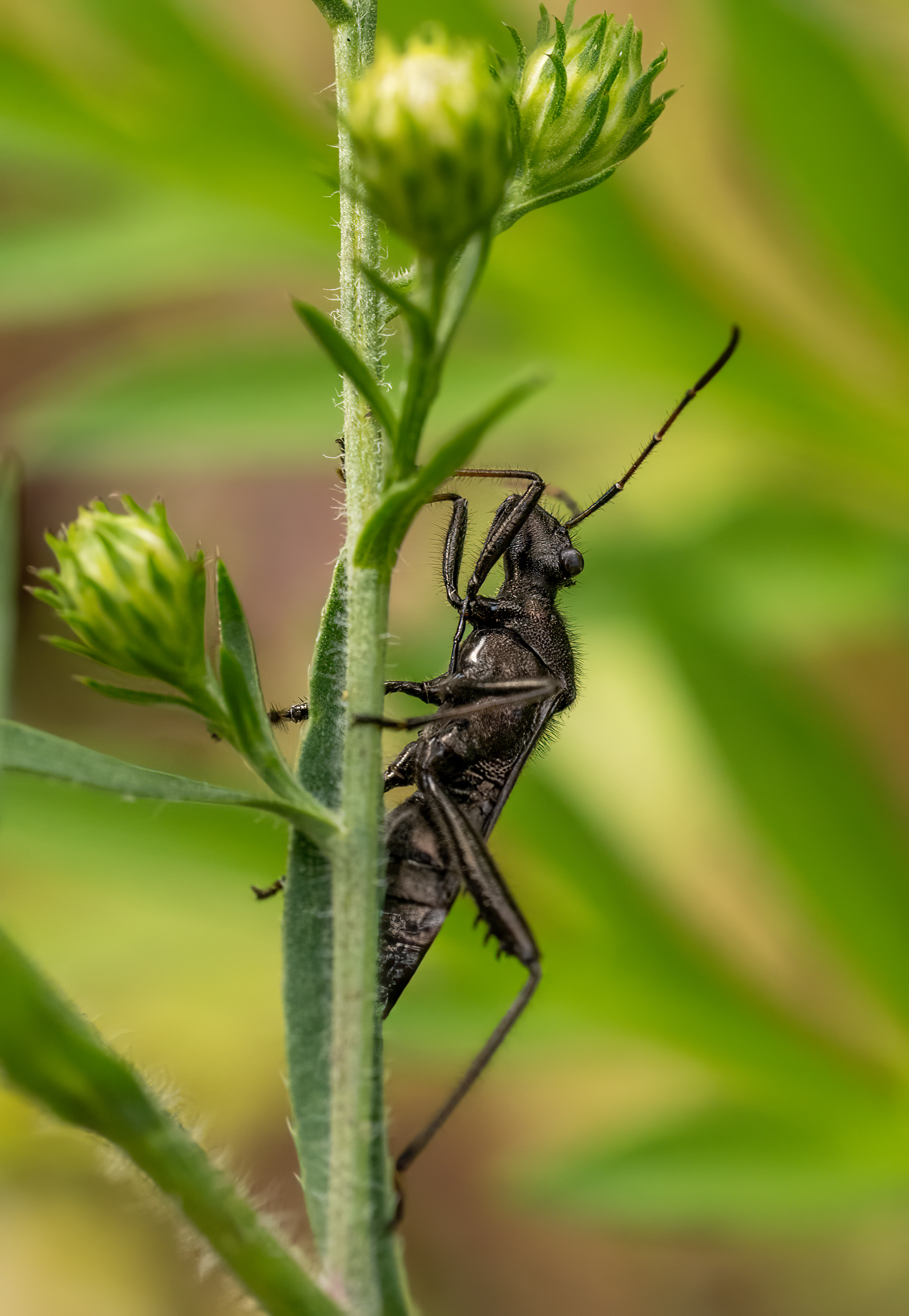
A. eurinus in Tennessee

Alydus eurinus is a species of broad-headed bug in the family Alydidae. It is found in North America.

== Morphology ==
Alydus eurinus is mostly dark in color with lighter markings sometimes observed on the legs and abdomen. However, coloring on the side of the head is absent. Fine hairs cover the body. The corners of the posterior pronotum plate are rounded, while in a similar species, Alydus pilosulus, the corners are more angular. Their wings are dark in color and possess many longitudinal veins, which distinguish them from the morphologically similar family, Lygaeidae.

=== Sound production ===
Alydus uses ridges, or stridulitrum, on the forewing and nodes, or plectrum, on the femur to produce stridulation. These structures are present on both sexes. The stridulitrum consists of a series of equidistant ridges which are the longest at the midsection of the corium. The plectrum consists of nodes found on the legs which are a project of bone or stiff tissue which are along and across the femur. The sound which is produced is theorized to be of low intensity due to the small size of the plectrum's nodes and to be an assortment of notes rather than one.

== Diet ==
Alydus eurinus feeds mostly on legumes but can be found on flowering plants, such as goldenrod, later in the season. They are also known to feed on carrion, such as a dead toad.

== Defense ==
The primary defense is mimicry. As nymphs, they resemble flightless ants. As adults, they resemble spider wasps. Unlike ants and wasps, Alydus eurinus has mouthparts typical of the Hemipteran, in which the mandibles and maxillae have been modified to form a stomatostyle.

They also have a secondary chemical defense. The defensive chemical mix of butyric and hexanoic acids is released from their metathoracic scent glands. Nymphs and adults possess defensive chemicals, but the Nymph's chemical mix is much weaker than the chemicals the adults produce.

== Subspecies ==
These two subspecies belong to the species Alydus eurinus:

- Alydus eurinus eurinus (Say, 1825)
- Alydus eurinus obesus Fracker, 1918
