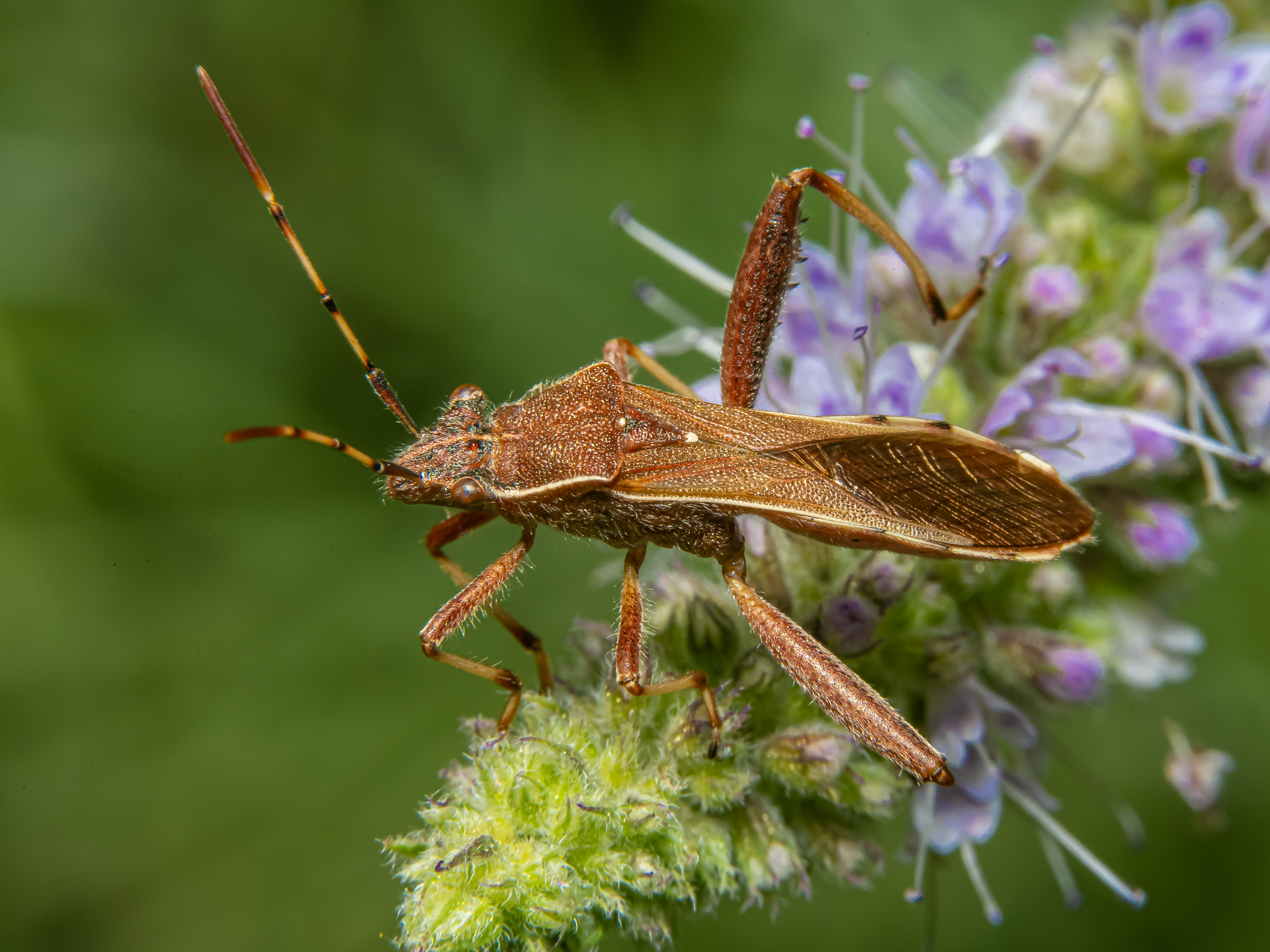

Scientific classification
- Kingdom: Animalia
- Phylum: Arthropoda
- Clade: Pancrustacea
- Class: Insecta
- Order: Hemiptera
- Suborder: Heteroptera
- Family: Alydidae
- Genus: Camptopus
- Species: C. lateralis

Binomial name
- Camptopus lateralis (Germar,1817)

Synonyms
- Alydus lateralis Germar, 1817; Camptopus annulatus (Brullé, 1832); Camptopus geranii (Dufour, 1833); Camptopus marginalis (Herrich-Schäffer, 1835); Camptopus marginatus (Herrich-Schäffer, 1835); Camptopus occipes (Herrich-Schäffer, 1835); Camptopus brevipes (Herrich-Schäffer, 1840); Camptopus undulatus (Westwood, 1842)

= Camptopus lateralis =

Species of true bug

Camptopus lateralis, common name broad-headed bug, is a species of true bugs of the family Alydidae, subfamily Alydinae.

== Distribution ==
This species is present in most of Europe.

== Description ==
Camptopus lateralis can reach a length of 12–15 millimetres (0.47–0.59 in). Body is elongated and rather hairy, with a dark brown background color, white margins and many veins in the membranous apex. Abdomen is orange brown. Head is wider than the pronotum. Antennae have four segments. Femurs are thorny and enlarged, while tibias are yellowish-brown and curved.

This species is rather similar to Alydus calcaratus, that has rectilinear tibias.

== Biology ==
These bugs are polyphagous but they mainly feed on Coronilla, Lotus, Trifolium, Ononis, Astragalus, Medicago, Ulex and Genista (Fabaceae), Rosmarinus officinalis (Lamiaceae), Euphorbia characias (Euphorbiaceae), Quercus coccifera (Fagaceae), Juniperus oxycedrus (Cupressaceae) .

== Gallery ==
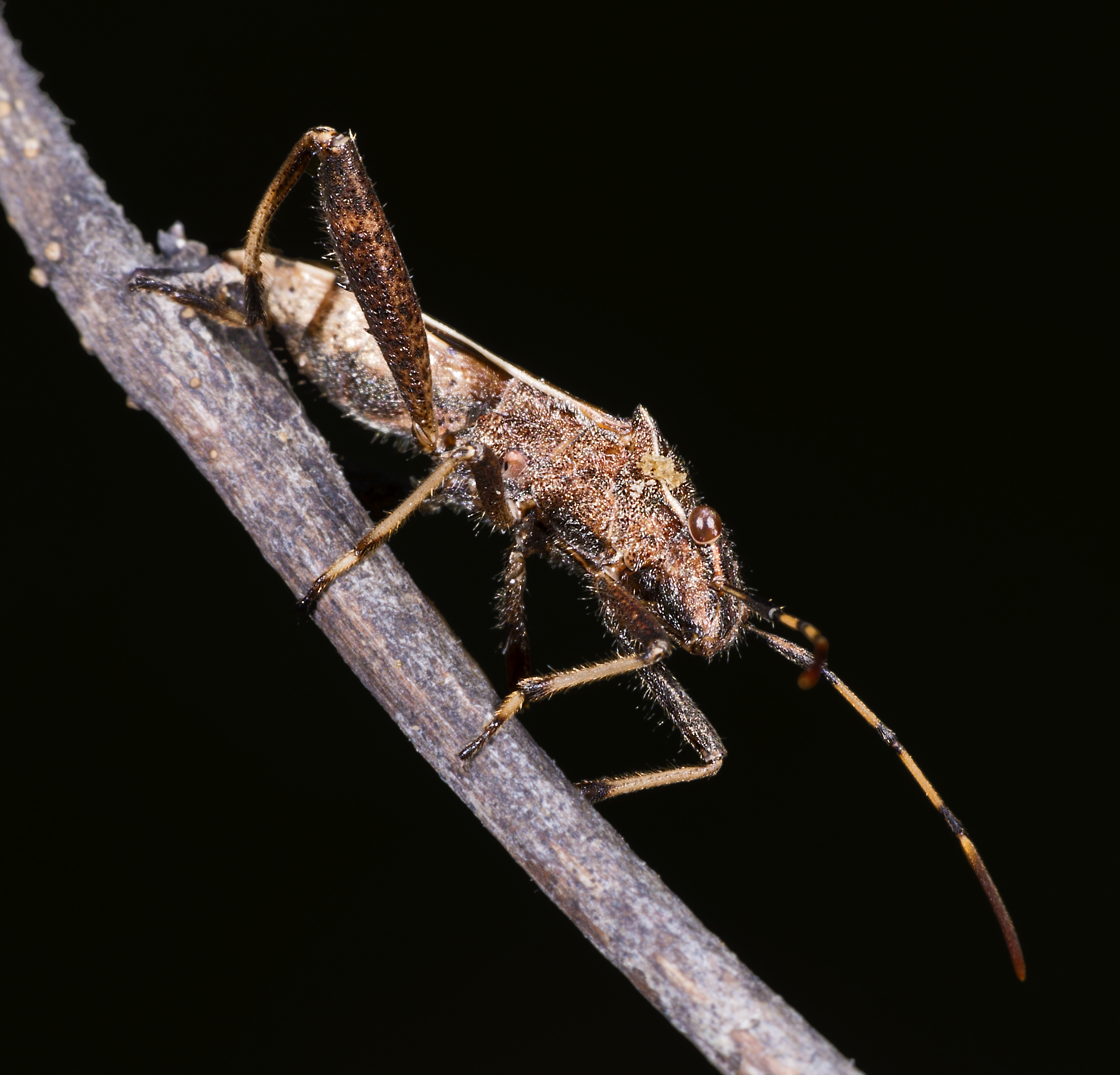
Side view

== Bibliography ==
- Carapezza & Mifsud. 2015. Bulletin of the Entomological Society of Malta 7:41
- Cuesta Segura, Baena Ruíz & Mifsud. 2010. Bulletin of the Entomological Society of Malta 3:29
- Dolling. 2006.. Catalogue of Heteroptera of the Palaearctic Region 5:35
- Germar. 1817. Reise nach Dalmatien und in das Gebiet von Ragusa 285–28
- Moulet. 1995. Faune de France 81:9, 13, 17, 21, 252–259
- Wachmann, Melber & Deckert. 2007. Wanzen 3:204
