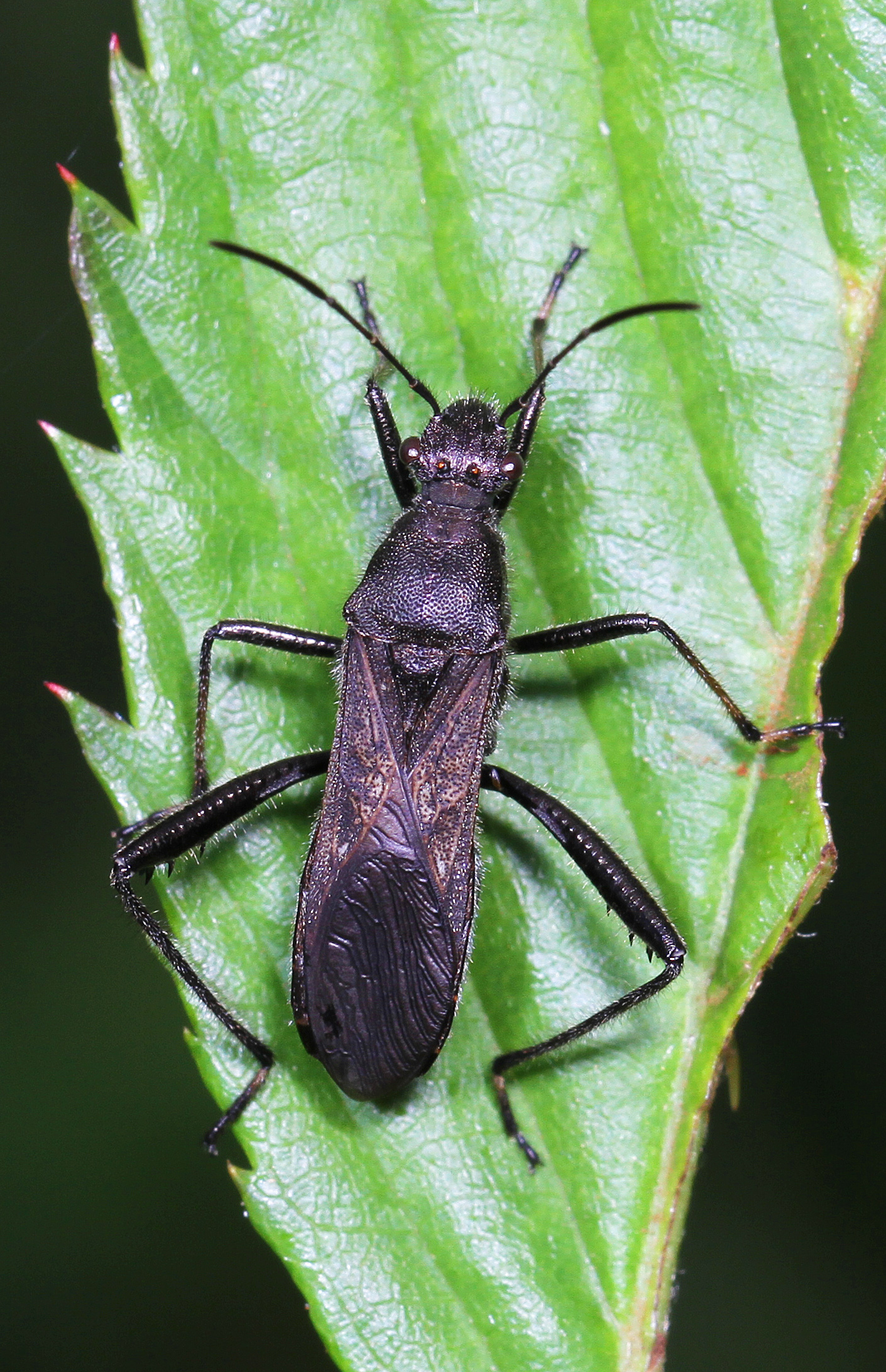
- Alydus eurinus

Scientific classification
- Domain: Eukaryota
- Kingdom: Animalia
- Phylum: Arthropoda
- Class: Insecta
- Order: Hemiptera
- Suborder: Heteroptera
- Family: Alydidae
- Subfamily: Alydinae
- Genus: Alydus; Fabricius, 1803

= Alydus =

Genus of insects

Alydus is the type genus of broad-headed bugs in the family Alydidae. There are about 11 described species in Alydus, including 2 extinct species. Species are recorded from North America and Europe through to temperate Asia.

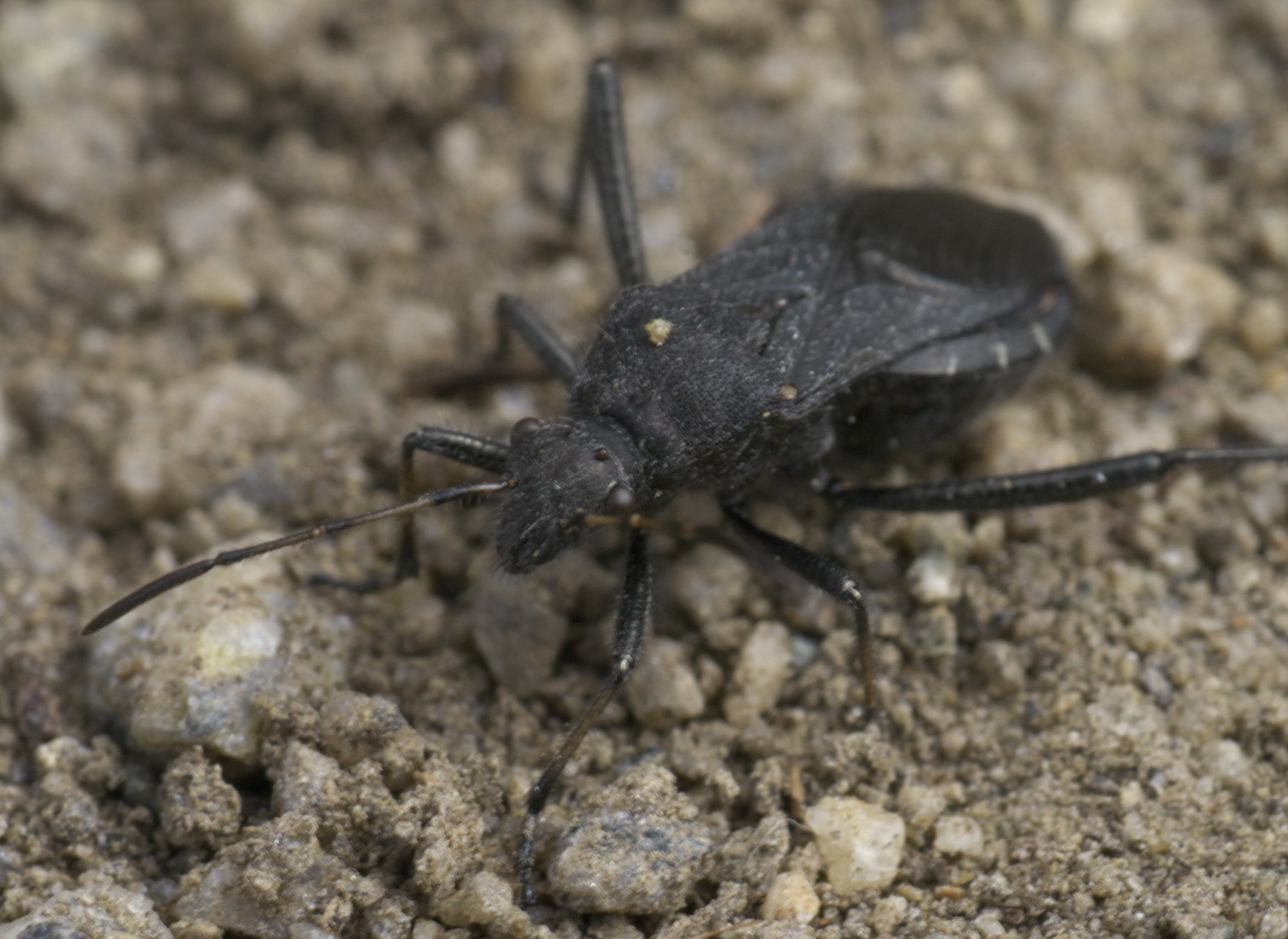
Alydus

== Species ==
These 11 species belong to the genus Alydus:

- Alydus angulatus Hsiao, 1965
- Alydus calcaratus (Linnaeus, 1758) - red-backed bug - type species (as Cimex calcaratus Linnaeus)
- Alydus conspersus Montandon, 1893
- Alydus eurinus (Say, 1825)
- Alydus pilosulus Herrich-Schaeffer, 1847
- Alydus rupestris Fieber, 1861
- Alydus scutellatus Van Duzee, 1903
- Alydus tomentosus Fracker, 1918
- Alydus zichyi Horváth, 1901
- † Alydus pristinus Germar, 1837
- † Alydus pulchellus Heer, 1853
