= Alydus tomentosus =

Scientific classification
- Domain: Eukaryota
- Kingdom: Animalia
- Phylum: Arthropoda
- Class: Insecta
- Order: Hemiptera
- Suborder: Heteroptera
- Family: Alydidae
- Genus: Alydus
- Species: A. tomentosus

Binomial name
- Alydus tomentosus Fracker, 1918

Species of true bug

Alydus tomentosus is a species of broad-headed bug in the family Alydidae. It is found in North America.
