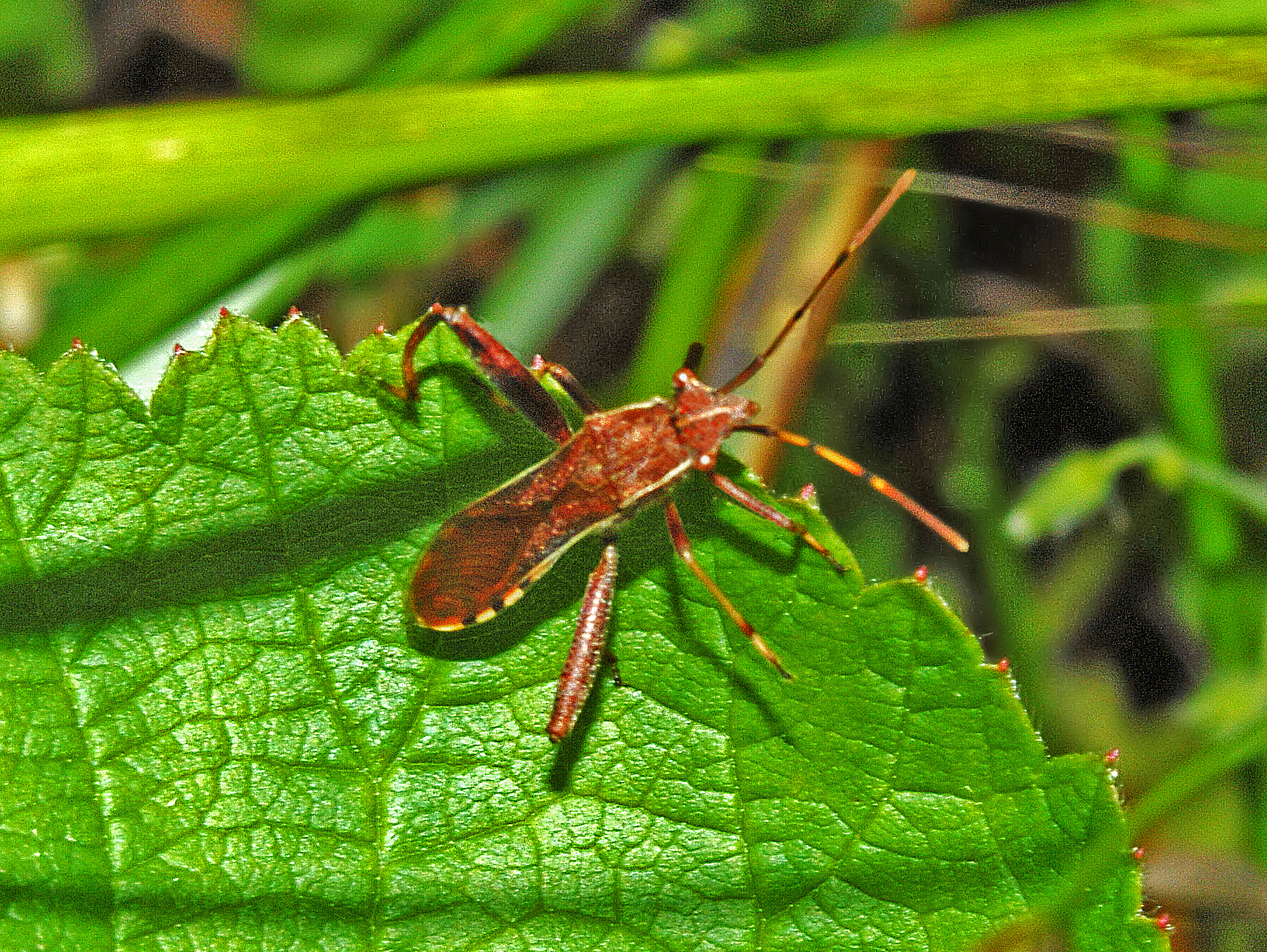
- Camptopus lateralis

Scientific classification
- Kingdom: Animalia
- Phylum: Arthropoda
- Clade: Pancrustacea
- Class: Insecta
- Order: Hemiptera
- Suborder: Heteroptera
- Family: Alydidae
- Subfamily: Alydinae
- Genus: Camptopus; Amyot & Audinet-Serville, 1843

= Camptopus =

Genus of true bugs

Camptopus is a genus of true bugs in the family Alydidae, subfamily Alydinae.

== Distribution ==
They are found in Europe, the Canary Islands, the Caucasus, and Israel.

== Species ==
Species within this genus include:

- Camptopus bifasciatuS (Fieber, 1864)
- Camptopus eberti (Seidenstücker, 1968)
- Camptopus illustris (Horváth 1899)
- Camptopus lateralis (Germar, 1817)
- Camptopus tragacanthae (Kolenati, 1845)
