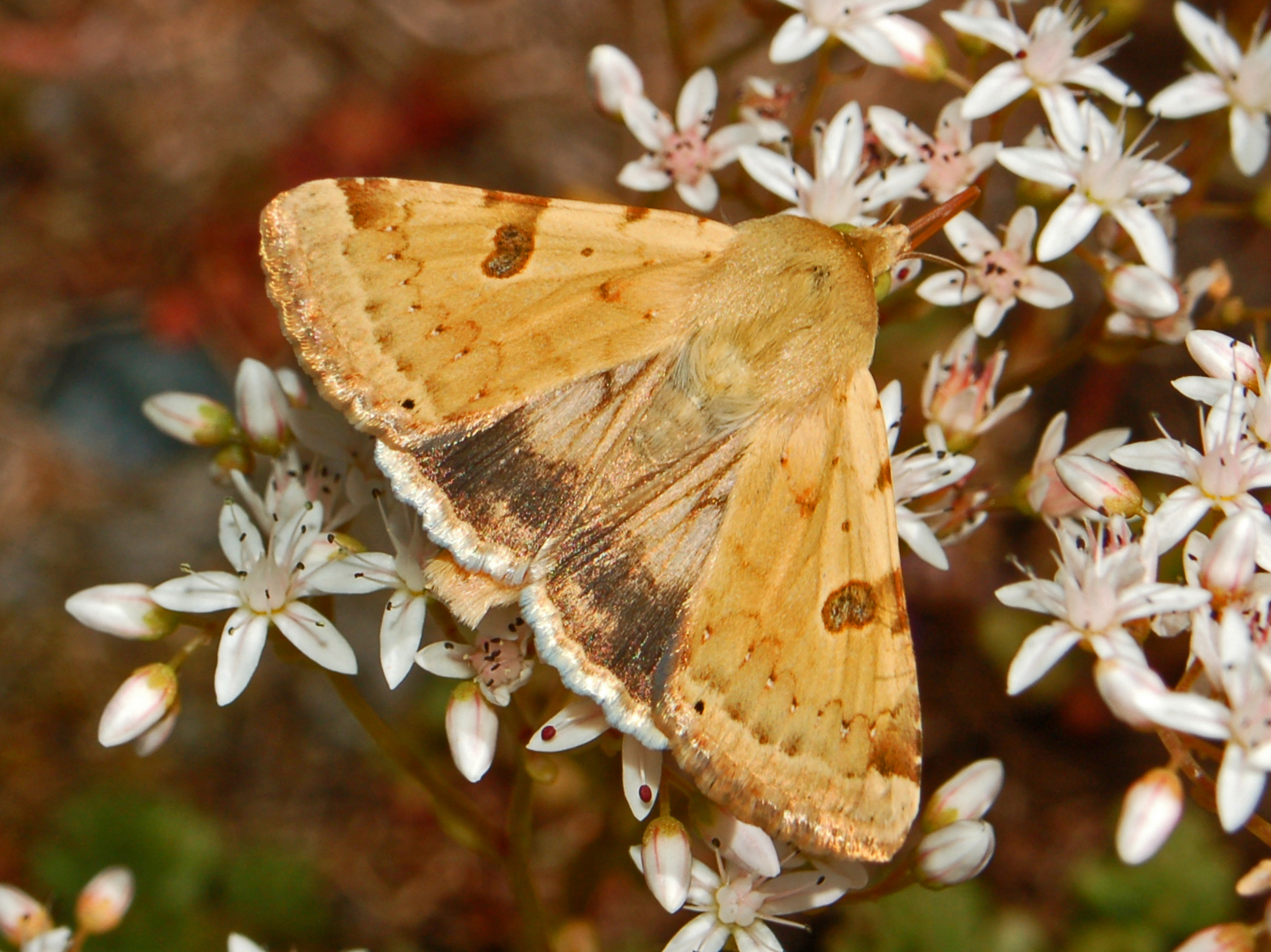
- Dorsal view

Scientific classification
- Kingdom: Animalia
- Phylum: Arthropoda
- Clade: Pancrustacea
- Class: Insecta
- Order: Lepidoptera
- Superfamily: Noctuoidea
- Family: Noctuidae
- Genus: Heliothis
- Species: H. peltigera

Binomial name
- Heliothis peltigera (Denis & Schiffermüller, 1775)

Synonyms
- List: Peltothis peltigera; Noctua peltigera Denis & Schiffermuller 1775; Heliothis alphea (Cramer, 1780); Phalaena alphea Cramer, 1780; Heliothis charmione (Stoll, 1790); Phalaena charmione Stoll, 1790; Heliothis florentina (Esper, 1788); Phalaena florentina Esper, 1788; Heliothis insulata (Navas, 1924); Chloridea insulata Navas, 1924; Heliothis straminea (Donovan, 1793); Phalaena straminea Donovan, 1793; Phalaena scutigera Borkhausen, 1792; Heliothis barbara (Fabricius ,1794); Heliothis guidellii Constantini,1922

= Heliothis peltigera =

Species of moth

Heliothis peltigera, also known as the bordered straw, is a species of moth of the family Noctuidae.

== Etymology ==
The Greek epithet "Heliothis" means "scorched by the sun", while the Latin species name peltigera means wearing a small shield, with reference to the reniform marking on the forewings.

== Distribution ==
This species can be found in Southern Europe and the Near East, but it is present further north too, because it is a regular migratory species northbound. It is also present in most of Africa (Algeria, Chad, Egypt, Eritrea, Gambia, Libya, Mauritania, Morocco, Niger, Somalia, Tunisia) and in Asia, ranging to China and Laos.

== Habitat ==
This heat-loving species occurs mainly on hot wastelands and warm slopes.

== Technical description and variation ==
Heliothis peltigera has a wingspan of 29–40 mm and forewings reaching a length of 16–19 mm. These moths are rather variable in pattern and colour.

Forewings are usually greyish ochreous, flushed with pale brown, except the narrow marginal area; lines are brown, indistinct; orbicular stigma is a dark dot. On middle of costa there is a reniform grey dot, with dark brown edge and centre, joined to a brown mark. A brown band appears between outer and submarginal lines. A black dot is present below vein 2 before margin. Hindwings show a broad brown-black marginal border, containing a pale blotch between 2 and 4. Cellspot is dark and fringes are white. Larvae are reddish grey or ochreous, dotted with white. Dorsal and subdorsal lines are dark, while spiracular line is white.

This species is quite similar to Heliothis nubigera, that shows less evident kidney markings, and to Helicoverpa armigera, that has lighter colored hindwings.

== Biology ==
These migratory moths arrives from May to October depending on the location. Adults* feed on flowers of various plants. The larvae feed on a variety of plants, including Ononis, Carthamus, Medicago, Calendula, Senecio viscosus, Tagetes, Hyoscyamus, Atropa belladonna and Atropa baetica.

== Gallery ==
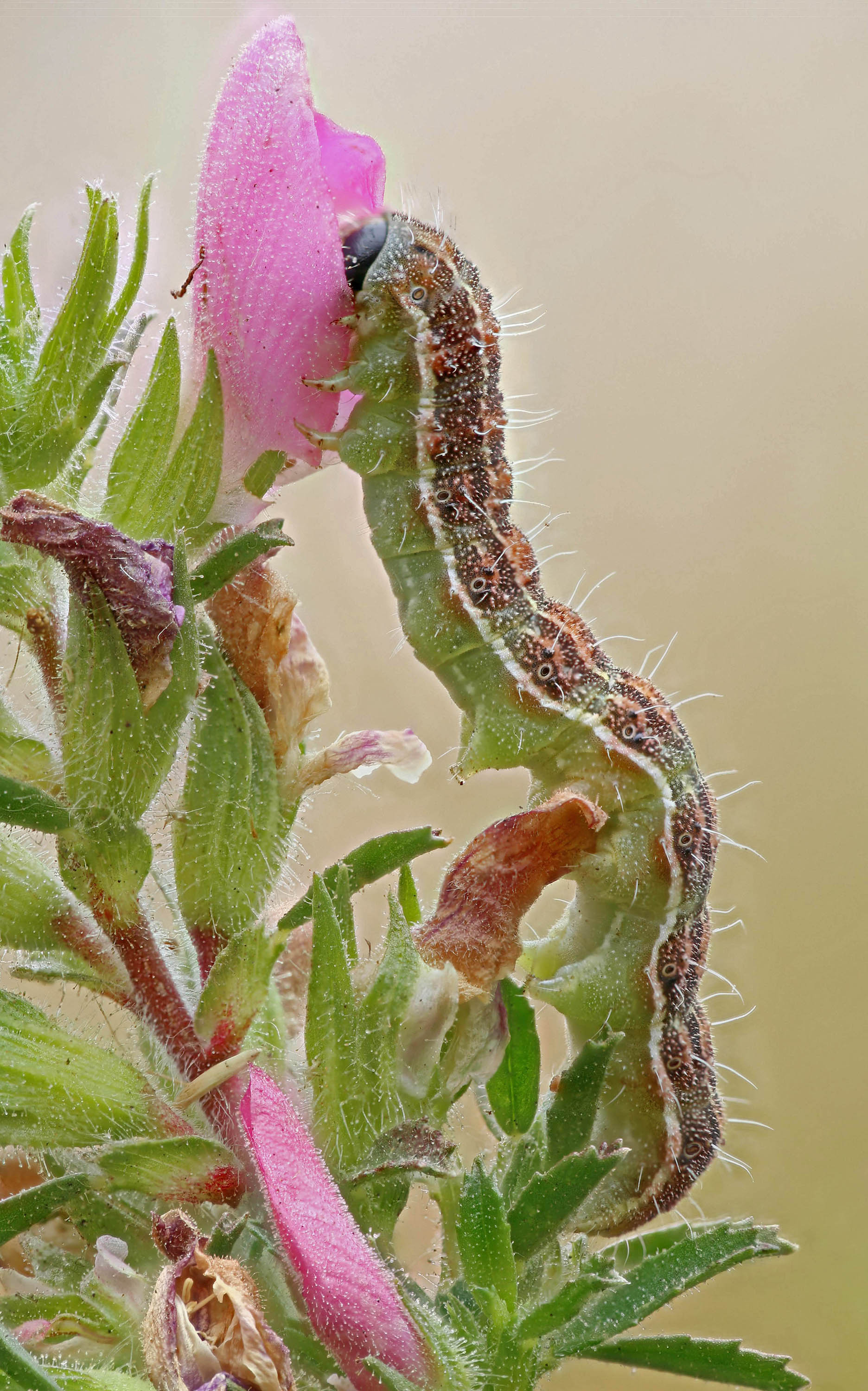
Caterpillar

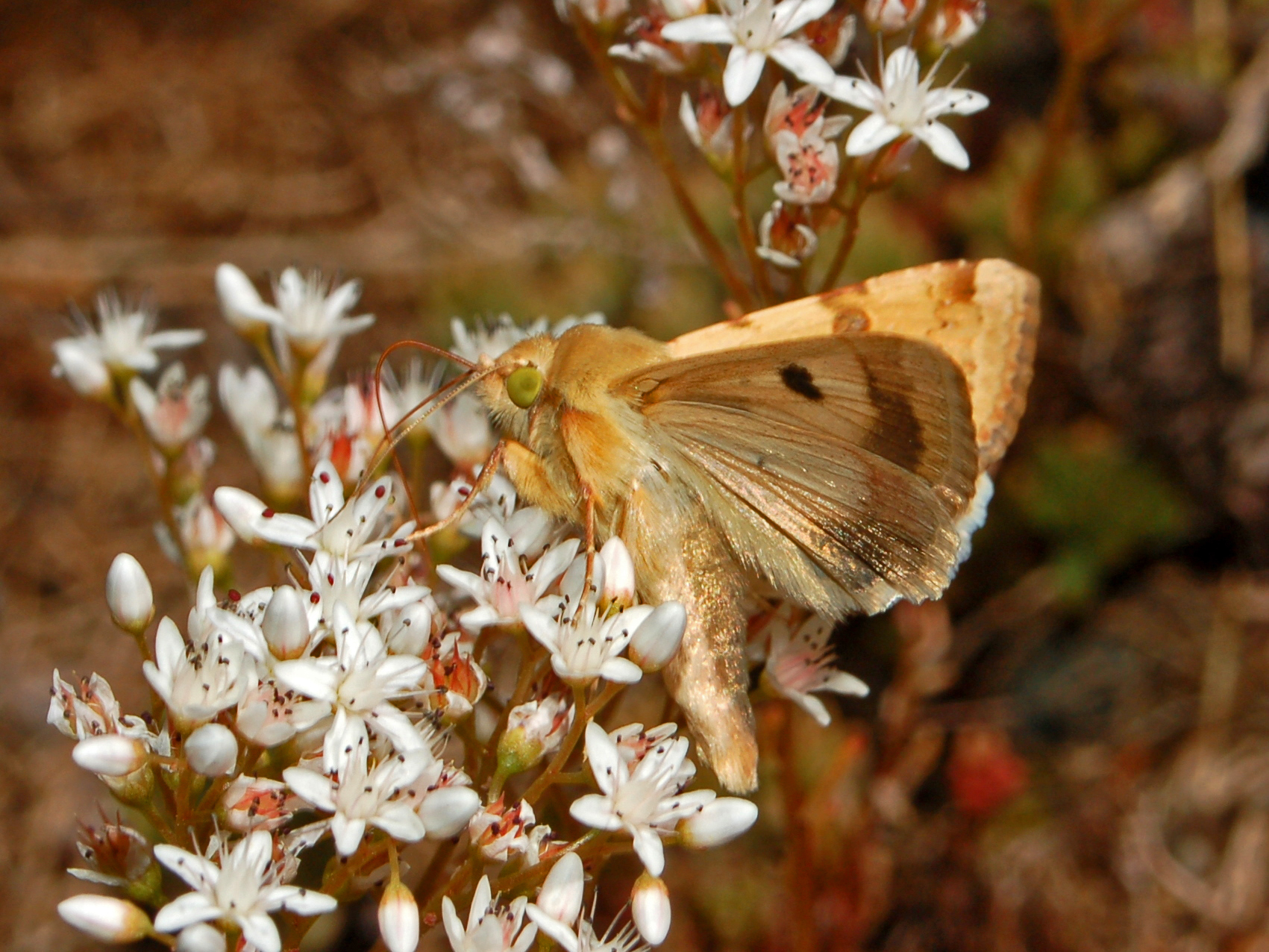
Imago. Side wiew

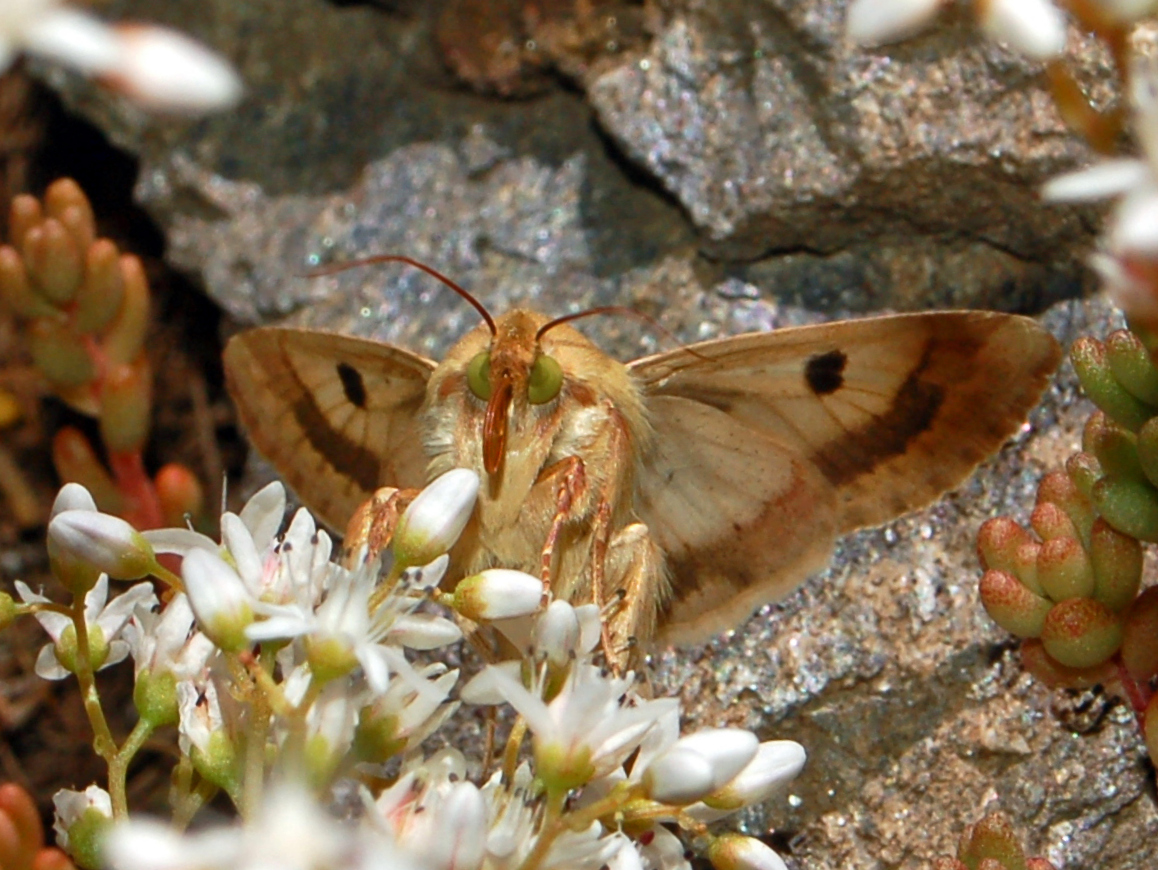
Imago. Underside view

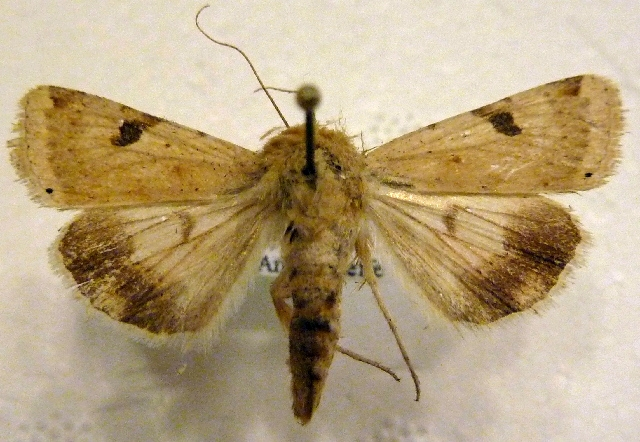
Mounted specimen
