= Alydus conspersus =

Scientific classification
- Domain: Eukaryota
- Kingdom: Animalia
- Phylum: Arthropoda
- Class: Insecta
- Order: Hemiptera
- Suborder: Heteroptera
- Family: Alydidae
- Genus: Alydus
- Species: A. conspersus

Binomial name
- Alydus conspersus Montandon, 1893

Species of true bug

Alydus conspersus is a species of broad-headed bug in the family Alydidae. It is found in North America.

== Subspecies ==
These three subspecies belong to the species Alydus conspersus:

- Alydus conspersus conspersus Montandon, 1893
- Alydus conspersus infuscatus Fracker, 1918
- Alydus conspersus rufescens Barber, 1911
