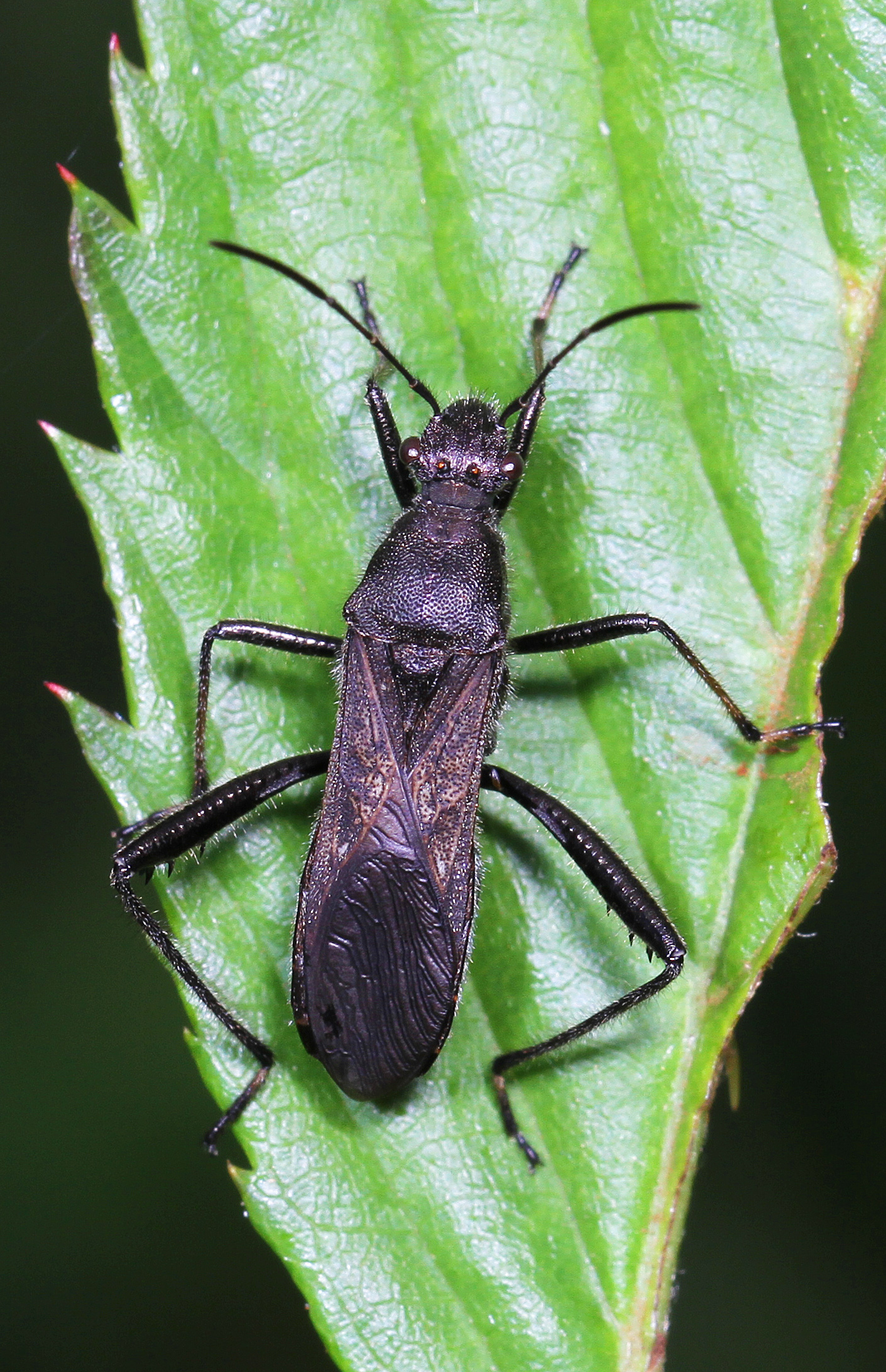
- Alydus eurinus

Scientific classification
- Domain: Eukaryota
- Kingdom: Animalia
- Phylum: Arthropoda
- Class: Insecta
- Order: Hemiptera
- Suborder: Heteroptera
- Family: Alydidae
- Subfamily: Alydinae; Amyot & Serville, 1843

= Alydinae =

Subfamily of true bugs

Alydinae is a subfamily of broad-headed bugs in the family Alydidae. There are about 24 genera and more than 140 described species in Alydinae.

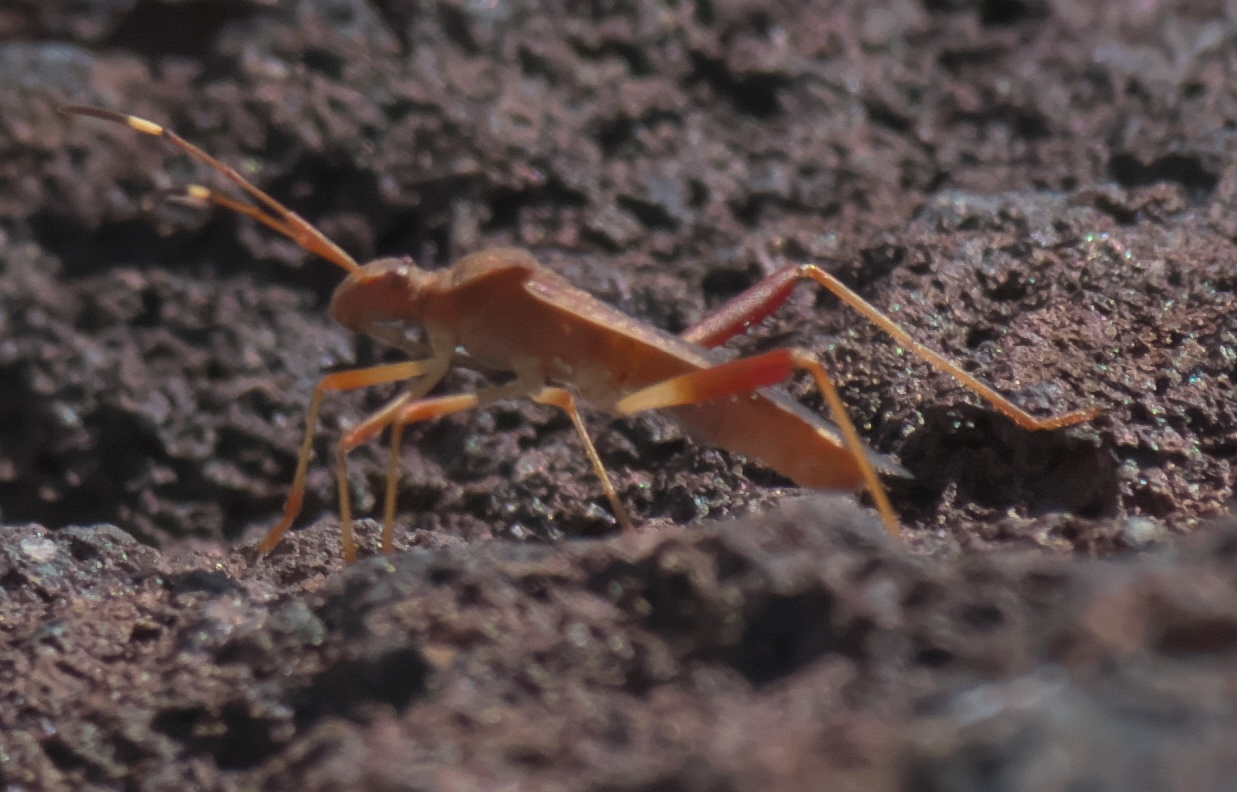
Megalotomus quinquespinosus

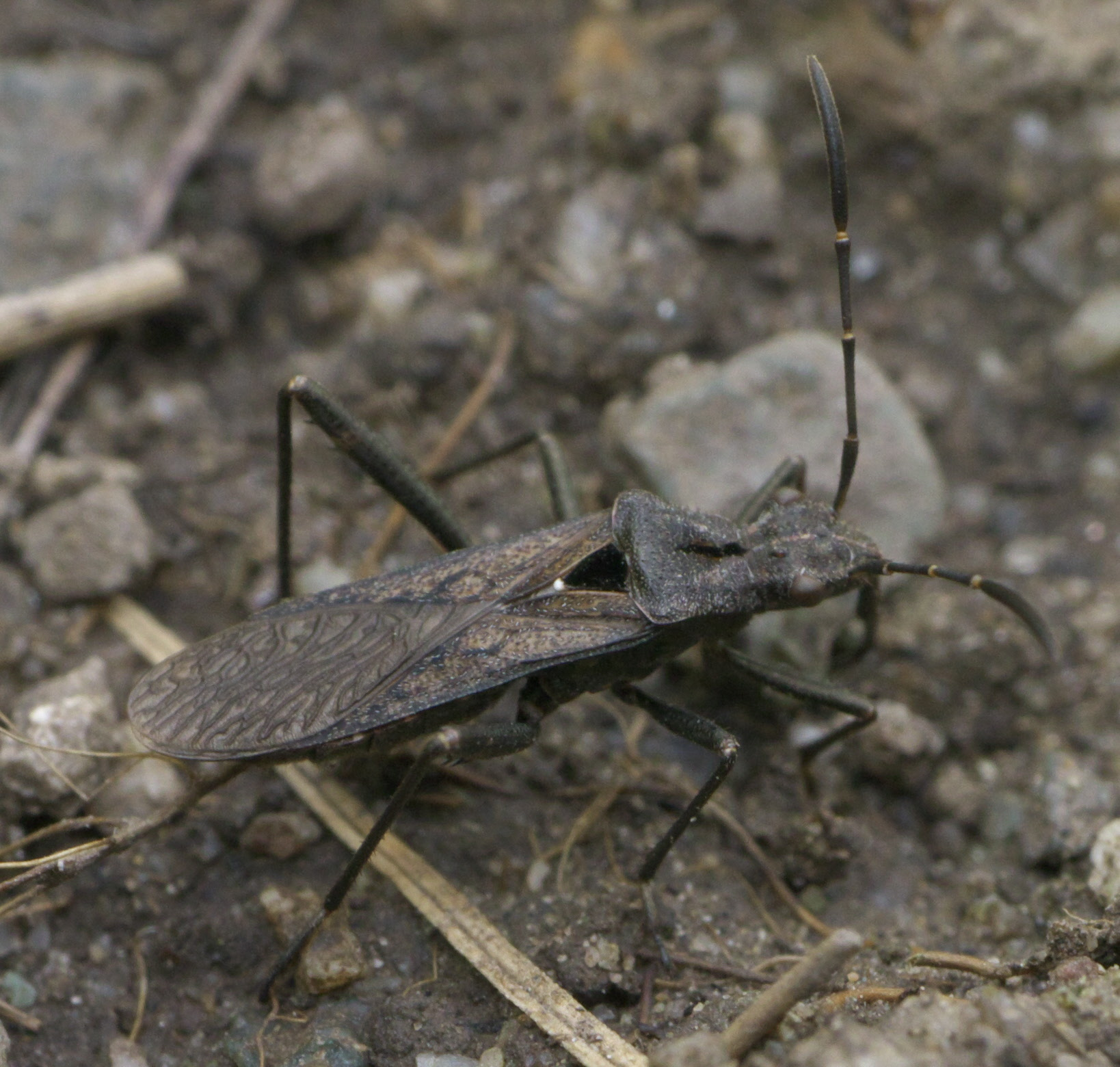
Alydus

== Genera ==
These 24 genera belong to the subfamily Alydinae:

- Alydus Fabricius, 1803
- Apidaurus Stål, 1870
- Burtinus Stål, 1860
- Camptopus Amyot & Serville, 1843
- Daclera Signoret, 1863
- Euthetus Dallas, 1852
- Hamedius Stål, 1860
- Heegeria Reuter, 1881
- Hyalymenus Amyot & Serville, 1843
- Hypselopus Burmeister, 1835
- Megalotomus Fieber, 1860
- Melanacanthus Stål, 1873
- Mirperus Stål, 1860
- Nariscus Stål, 1866
- Nemausus Stål, 1866
- Neomegalotomus Schaffner & Schaefer, 1998
- Oxycranum Bergroth, 1910
- Riptortus Stål, 1860
- Robustocephalus Ahmad, Abbas, Shadab & Khan, 1979
- Stachyocnemus Stål, 1870
- Tenosius Stål, 1860
- Tollius Stål, 1870
- Tupalus Stål, 1860
- Zulubius Bergroth, 1894
