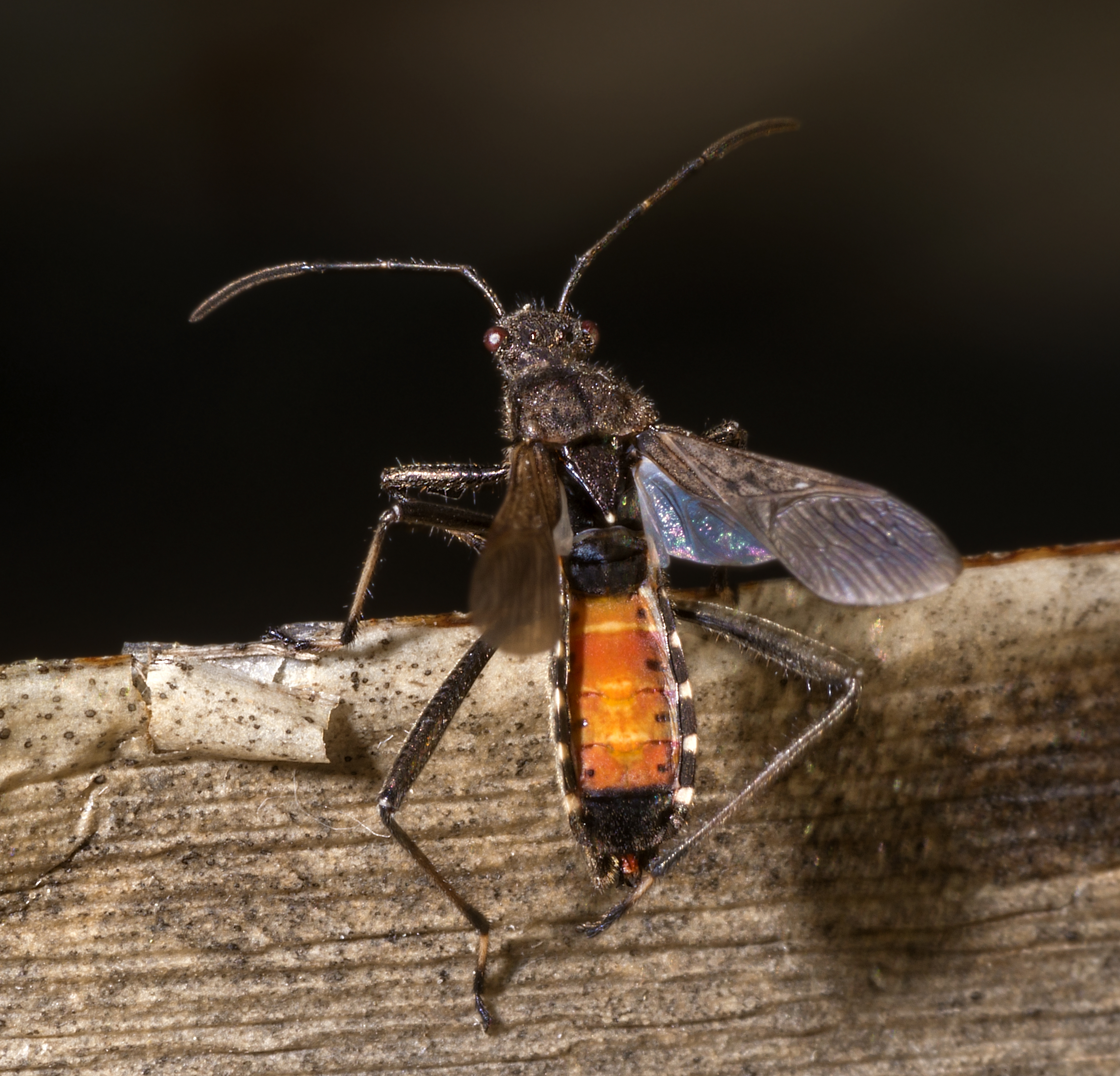

Scientific classification
- Domain: Eukaryota
- Kingdom: Animalia
- Phylum: Arthropoda
- Class: Insecta
- Order: Hemiptera
- Suborder: Heteroptera
- Family: Alydidae
- Genus: Alydus
- Species: A. calcaratus

Binomial name
- Alydus calcaratus (Linnaeus, 1758)

Synonyms
- Cimex calcaratus Linnaeus

= Alydus calcaratus =

Species of true bug

Alydus calcaratus is a bug species with a Holarctic distribution ranging from the British Isles almost all over Europe to eastern Siberia and China. Moreover, the species also in northern North America from Alaska and Québec across the United States to Wyoming. It is the only species in the family in northern Central Europe outside of the Alps.

Alydus calcaratus is a large (10.0 to 12.0 mm), oblong and mainly blackish-coloured bug. The head is as wide as the pronotum, the rear corners of the pronotum are rounded. The hind leg (femora) of the males are thickened and have several strong spines on the underside. As with all the other species of the family (Alydidae), the antennae have four segments, of which the fourth is curved. The body is blackish, the dorsum of the abdomen has a bright orange patch, which is visible only in flight. They resemble spider-hunting wasps such as Arachnospila.

Alydus calcaratus is phytophagous, the imagines and the nymphs feeding mostly on fallen seeds of various legumes (Fabaceae) especially species of the genera Sarothamnus, Cytisus, Genista and Ulex. Feeding on vertebrate carrion and faeces has also been observed. In Germany, imagines can be observed from the middle or end of June at the earliest, most occur in early August to mid-September, and the last observations are in October. The animals mate from July to September, nymphs were found from May to August. Information on the way of life of the nymphs is contradictory. The nymphs are said to live in ant nests but the nature of the relationship of the nymphs to ants is still unclear.

The habitat is heaths, dry grassland, dry places with light soils and sand dunes.
