= Megachile octosignata =

Scientific classification
- Domain: Eukaryota
- Kingdom: Animalia
- Phylum: Arthropoda
- Class: Insecta
- Order: Hymenoptera
- Family: Megachilidae
- Genus: Megachile
- Species: M. octosignata

Binomial name
- Megachile octosignata Nylander, 1852

Species of leafcutter bee (Megachile)

Megachile octosignata is a species of bee in the family Megachilidae. It was described by Nylander in 1852. Native to Europe, the bees nest in rock crevices and make their cells out of leaf scraps.
