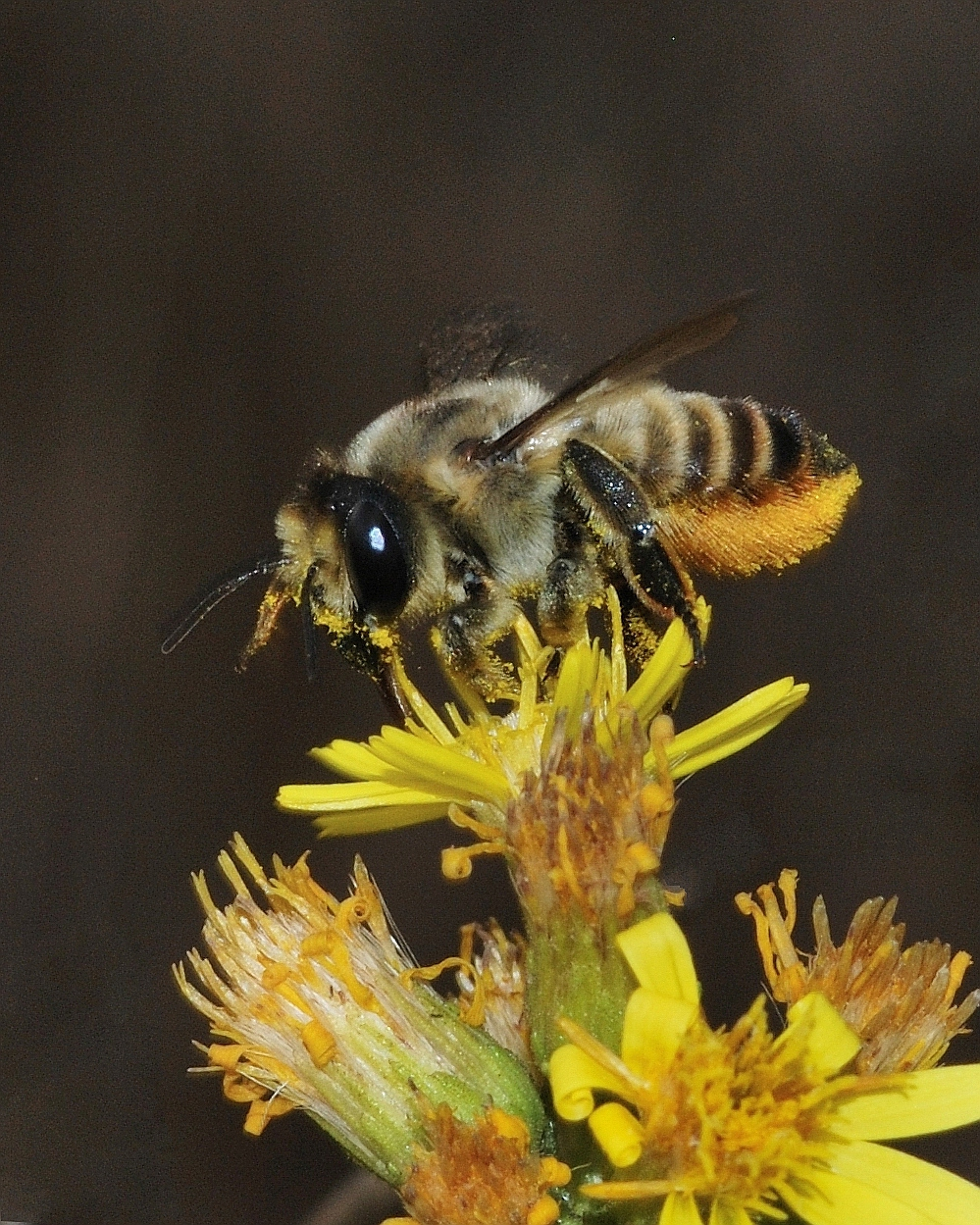

Scientific classification
- Kingdom: Animalia
- Phylum: Arthropoda
- Class: Insecta
- Order: Hymenoptera
- Family: Megachilidae
- Genus: Megachile
- Species: M. lagopoda

Binomial name
- Megachile lagopoda (L., 1761)

= Megachile lagopoda =

Species of leafcutter bee (Megachile)

Megachile lagopoda is a species of bee in the family Megachilidae. It was described by Carl Linnaeus in 1761.
