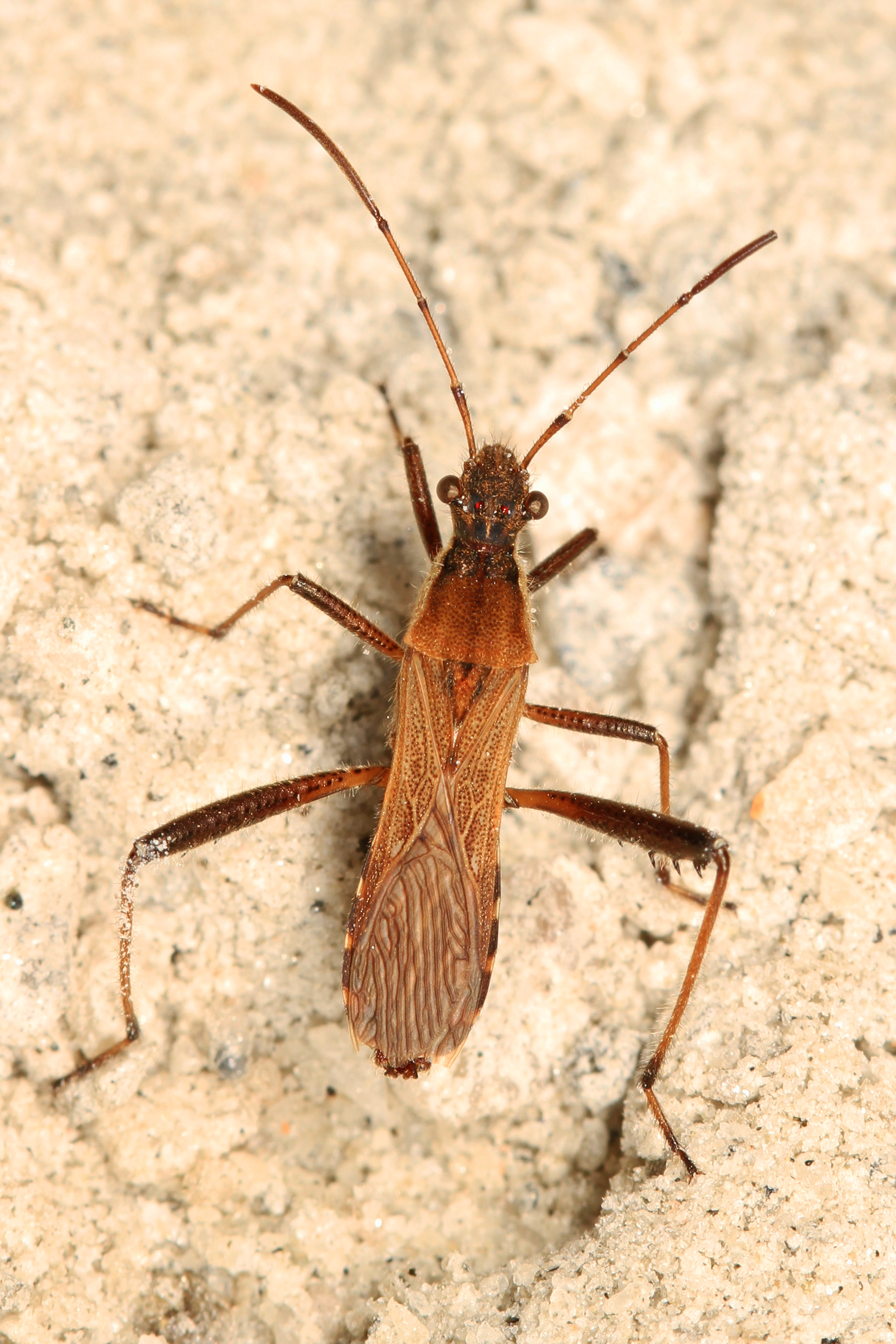

Scientific classification
- Domain: Eukaryota
- Kingdom: Animalia
- Phylum: Arthropoda
- Class: Insecta
- Order: Hemiptera
- Suborder: Heteroptera
- Family: Alydidae
- Genus: Alydus
- Species: A. pilosulus

Binomial name
- Alydus pilosulus Herrich-Schaeffer, 1847

= Alydus pilosulus =

Species of insect

Alydus pilosulus is a species of broad-headed bug in the family Alydidae. It is found in North America and Oceania.
