= Serra de la Mussara =

Mountain range in Catalonia, Spain

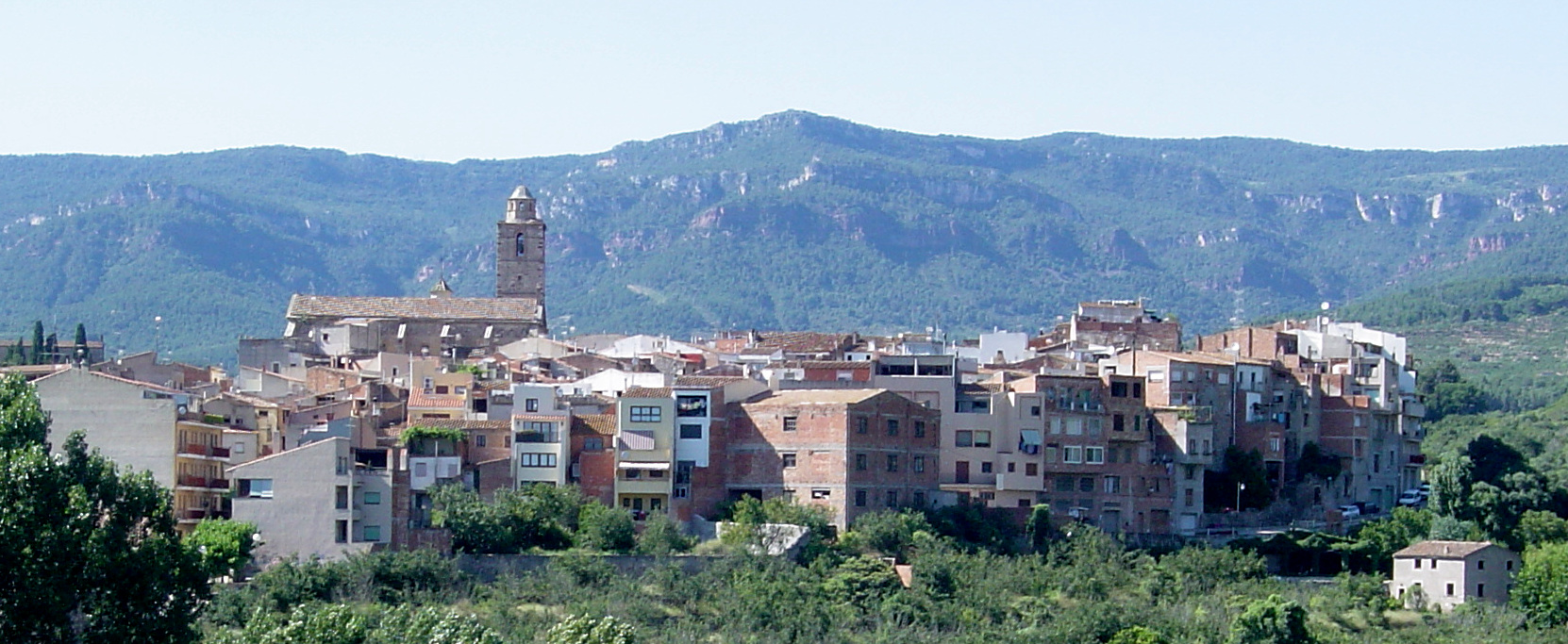
- L'Aleixar with the la Mussara Mountains in the background

Highest point
- Elevation: 1,055.6 m (3,463 ft)
- Coordinates: 41°15′28.73″N 01°03′20.80″E

Geography
- Location within Catalonia
- Location: Baix Camp, Catalonia
- Parent range: Prades Mountains

Geology
- Mountain type: Limestone

Climbing
- First ascent: Unknown
- Easiest route: From Vilaplana

Serra de la Mussara is a mountain range of Catalonia, Spain. It is a subrange of the Prades Mountains. Located north of the town of Vilaplana, Its highest point La Mussara has an elevation of 1,055.6 metres (3,463 ft) above sea level; other important peaks are Punta del Sec (979 metres [3,212 ft]), Tossal Rodó (966 metres [3,169 ft]) and La Puntota (858 metres [2,815 ft]).

There are very steep cliffs in this range, like the Cingle del Patxeco. The Serra de la Mussara mountain range is named after the abandoned village of La Mussara, located in the range.

== See also ==
- Prades Mountains
- Mountains of Catalonia
